= Robert Honorary Award =

Danish film award

The Robert Honorary Award (Danish: Æres-Robert, Honorary Robert) has been given occasionally since 1986 as one of the Robert Awards (Danish: Robert prisen) by the Danish Film Academy. It is the Danish equivalent of the American Academy Honorary Award.

A Robert Honorary Award may be given to a film professional whose many years in the film industry deserve recognition and praise. It is also with this award, the Film Academy may choose to honour those film professionals that can not be nominated for a Robert within the existing categories – casting director, line producing, poster designers, and so on. The price is always given with a motivation and traditionally awarded at the Robert-ceremony.

In 2014, the Film Academy introduced one Honorary Robert Award, which the Board may choose to give to international film artists and film professionals, whose work has inspired and motivated Danish film-makers.

== Recipients ==
- 1986: Erik Rasmussen
- 1990: Ebbe Rode
- 1991: Jannik Hastrup
- 1994: Astrid Henning-Jensen
- 1995: Per Holst
- 1998: Henning Bahs and Erik Balling
- 1999: Henning Moritzen
- 2000: Marguerite Viby
- 2001: Rolf Konow
- 2002: Tove Jystrup
- 2003: Kenneth Madsen
- 2004: Helle Virkner
- 2005: Bent Fabricius-Bjerre
- 2006: Kirsten Dalgaard
- 2009: Ole Michelsen
- 2010: Jette Termann
- 2011: Jan Lehmann
- 2012: Henning Carlsen
- 2013: Ghita Nørby
- 2014: Karen Bentzon
- 2014: William Friedkin (Lifetime Achievement Award, Honorary Robert)
- 2015: Christel Hammer
- 2017: Jimmy Leavens
- 2018: Tivi Magnusson

== See also ==
- Bodil Honorary Award
