= The House That Jack Built (2018 film) =

2018 film by Lars von Trier

- Theatrical release poster
- Directed by: Lars von Trier
- Screenplay by: Lars von Trier
- Story by: Jenle Hallund; Lars von Trier
- Produced by: Louise Vesth
- Starring: Matt Dillon; Bruno Ganz; Uma Thurman; Siobhan Fallon Hogan; Sofie Gråbøl; Riley Keough; Jeremy Davies
- Cinematography: Manuel Alberto Claro
- Edited by: Molly Malene Stensgaard; Jacob Secher Schulsinger
- Music by: Víctor Reyes
- Production companies: Zentropa; Film i Väst; Eurimages; Nordisk Film; Les Films du Losange
- Distributed by: TrustNordisk (Denmark); Les Films du Losange (France)
- Release dates: 14 May 2018 (Cannes); 28 November 2018 (United States); 29 November 2018 (Denmark)
- Running time: 152 minutes
- Countries: Denmark; France; Germany; Sweden
- Language: English
- Budget: €8.7 million (~$9.9 million)
- Box office: $5.6 million

The House That Jack Built is a 2018 psychological horror film written and directed by Lars von Trier. It stars Matt Dillon, Bruno Ganz, Uma Thurman, Siobhan Fallon Hogan, Sofie Gråbøl, Riley Keough, and Jeremy Davies. Its plot follows Jack (Dillon), a serial killer who, over a 12-year period beginning in the late 1970s, commits numerous murders in the U.S. state of Washington. Utilizing Dante's Inferno as a metatext, the film is structured as a series of flashback vignettes relayed by Jack to the Roman poet Virgil, during which Jack attempts to make an argument for his crimes.

Originally conceived as a television project by von Trier, The House That Jack Built began production in Sweden in 2016. The film debuted at the Cannes Film Festival, marking von Trier's return to the festival after more than six years. The House That Jack Built received polarized reviews from critics, with positive feedback for Dillon’s performance and the film's artistic direction, but criticism for what some saw as empty provocation.

== Plot ==
Jack, a failed architect from Washington state, recounts to Virgil – whom he refers to as Verge – several memorable incidents in his life as a serial killer.

An abrasive woman needs to fix her broken jack to repair a flat tire. Jack takes her to a blacksmith, only for her to irritate him on the way with insulting remarks. Offended, Jack bludgeons her with the broken tire jack and stores her body in an industrial freezer inside a factory building he purchased from a pizzeria.

After killing a woman named Claire, Jack's obsessive–compulsive disorder (OCD) compels him to obsessively clean the crime scene, almost causing him to get caught. In a panic, he drives off without securing Claire's body, dragging her behind his van, creating a blood trail leading to the factory building. Fortunately for Jack, the rain washes away the trail, which Jack takes to be divine intervention. He declares he will begin to take greater risks, even writing anonymously to the media and taunting the police.

Jack brings his girlfriend and her two sons, "Grumpy" and George, on a hunting trip. He kills both sons and torments the mother, before killing her as well. Jack fashions Grumpy's corpse into a sculpture with a grisly smile.

Jack is in a dysfunctional relationship with a woman, Jacqueline, whom he abuses. Jack and Jaqueline are seen talking on a phone connected by a red wire, a reference to the Chinese concept of the red thread of fate, that which connects lovers. After Jack drunkenly confesses his killings to her, and watching his behavior, she approaches a policeman, who dismisses her as drunk. Jack later binds her and cuts off her breasts. He pins one of the breasts to the policeman's car and fashions the other into a wallet.

Jack plans to kill six men in his freezer with a single bullet. One of them, an army veteran, tells Jack that he needs the right ammunition. Jack enters a gun store, and then angrily berates Al, the owner, for selling him the wrong ammunition. Al uses the phone as Jack is leaving, presumably to call SP to warn him. Jack visits his contact SP to buy ammo. When SP calls the police, Jack kills him, as well as the responding officer. Jack returns to his freezer and unseals a chamber, where he meets Verge, who has been observing Jack throughout his life.

In the freezer, Jack arranges the frozen corpses he has collected over the years into the shape of a house. As police break in, Jack enters his "house" and follows Verge into a hole in the floor, entering Hell.

The two reach a pit leading to the ninth circle and centre of Hell. Footage is shown about the Kola Superdeep Borehole, in which, according to legend, human cries from the underworld were heard. A broken bridge spans the pit. Jack notices a stairway on the other side, which leads the way out of Hell. Jack attempts to scale a rock wall to access the staircase, against Verge's advice, but falls straight into Treachery instead as his ultimate punishment, while Verge slowly walks away.

== Cast ==
- Matt Dillon as Jack – "Mr. Sophistication"
  - Emil Tholstrup as Young Jack
- Bruno Ganz as Verge
- Uma Thurman as Lady 1
- Siobhan Fallon Hogan as Claire Miller – Lady 2
- Sofie Gråbøl as Lady 3
- Riley Keough as Jacqueline – "Simple"
- Jeremy Davies as Al
- Jack McKenzie as Sonny
- Mathias Hjelm as Glenn
- Edward Speleers as Ed – Police Officer 2
- Marijana Jankovic as Kelly Miller – Female Student
- Carina Skenhede as Susan Hanson – Little Old Lady
- Rocco Day as Grumpy
- Cohen Day as George
- Robert Jezek as Police Officer 4
- Osy Ikhile as Military Man
- Christian Arnold as Man 1
- Yoo Ji-tae as Man 2
- Johannes Bah Kuhnke as Man 3
- Jerker Fahlström as Man 4
- David Bailie as S.P.
- Robert G. Slade as Rob
- Vasilije Mujka as Scythe Man, Elysian Fields

Jesper Tønnes plays an uncredited role as Phlegyas, the oarsman who transports Jack and Verge across the River Styx – the Fifth Circle of Hell (Wrath) – in a scene that recreates The Barque of Dante by Eugène Delacroix. Jean-Marc Barr (Europa), Jamie Bell (Nymphomaniac), Willem Dafoe (Antichrist), Charlotte Gainsbourg (Melancholia and Nymphomaniac), Nicole Kidman (Dogville), Udo Kier (The Kingdom), Kirsten Dunst (Melancholia), Kirsten Olesen (Medea), Birgitte Raaberg (The Kingdom), and Emily Watson (Breaking the Waves) appeared as uncredited archive footage from several of Lars von Trier's works in the fourth incident during Jack's notorious commentary with Verge; still retained in the "special thanks" end credits below.

== Production ==
=== Development ===
Von Trier originally developed the idea as a television series, but in February 2016, he announced that it would be a film. After extensively researching serial killers, von Trier had a completed script by May 2016. International sales rights for the film belong to TrustNordisk with von Trier's Zentropa producing. Film i Väst partly financed the film, and the Copenhagen Film Fund provided €1.08 million in production subsidies. The film is a co-production between France, Germany, Sweden, and Denmark.

The film's epilogue, in which Jack goes to Hell, was suggested by Von Trier's co-writer, Jenle Hallund, and which Von Trier felt appropriate: "I thought that's a good idea because it's a long time since we've really visited Hell in films. Particularly the journey to Hell. We put it together from different conceptions, or whatever the word is, of Hell. The Elysian Fields is something from the Roman mythology. I'm quite sure that Hell doesn't look like what we have made for this film." Von Trier also stated he was inspired by Alfred Hitchcock to give the film a "classical ending" in which Jack is punished: "Somehow I felt a little Hitchcock-like at the end of the film, with Jack hanging there above the abject depths. Never let the bad guy hang on his nails, as the audience won't care ... Psychopaths act out of an irrational certainty that they won't be caught. That's why the ending is like it is. It would be typical for me to let him live. But then I thought about good old Hitchcock and decided that this calls for a classical ending."

=== Casting ===
On 2 November 2016, von Trier announced that Matt Dillon would play the film's lead role. Announcements soon followed in February 2017 that Riley Keough and Sofie Gråbøl would also be joining the production with Uma Thurman's participation being announced the following month. The same month, von Trier described the film as celebrating "the idea that life is evil and soulless".

According to actor Peter Sarsgaard, he wanted to play Jack but was forced to turn down the lead role due to the film's nature.

=== Filming ===
Principal photography began in March 2017 outside Bengtsfors and Tösse in Dalsland, Sweden and was shot in Copenhagen, Gribskov, Trollhättan, Peak District and Montemerano. Dillon was initially influenced by American serial killer Ted Bundy, but his character soon became unique. Von Trier split the filming into two parts to allow editing in between, something he had done before. The film spent nearly a year in post-production, which included complicated special effects.

== Release ==
=== Theatrical ===
In March 2017, von Trier was reportedly negotiating to have the film premiere at the Cannes Film Festival, despite his being previously banned from the festival. On 19 April 2018, the film was approved to premiere at the Festival out-of-competition. After the announcement, a teaser trailer was released.

The film premiered at the Festival on 14 May 2018. It was reported that more than 100 audience members walked out during the premiere, though a 10-minute standing ovation followed the screening.

In October 2018, it was reported that the director's cut, which is the uncensored version that played at Cannes, would play in U.S. theaters for one night in November, followed by an edited R-rated version release in selected theaters and on digital platforms beginning on 14 December. Immediately following the unrated director's cut screenings, the Motion Picture Association of America (MPAA) issued a statement condemning the screening for not adhering to the board's guidelines. In the statement, it was noted that "the screening of an unrated version of the film in such close proximity to the release of the rated version—without obtaining a waiver—is in violation of the rating system's rules. ... Failure to comply with the rules can create confusion among parents and undermine the rating system — and may result in the imposition of sanctions against the film's submitter." By 5 December, the MPAA had resolved the dispute with IFC Films by pushing the digital release of the director's cut back to 2019, as opposed to coinciding with the 14 December theatrical release of the R-rated cut. On 6 December 2018, the director's cut was released to purchase on YouTube for several hours.

=== Home media ===
The House That Jack Built was released on DVD and Blu-ray disc (uncensored cut) in the United Kingdom on 4 March 2019 by Artificial Eye. Extra features include an introduction by director, an in-depth interview with director, a twenty-minute making-of featurette and theatrical Trailer. On 4 February 2020, Scream Factory released the film in the United States as a 2-disc Blu-ray with both cuts (theatrical and director's), as well as a 26-minute interview with von Trier by professor Peter Schepelern, filmed shortly after von Trier's winning of the Sonning Prize. Also included is the US theatrical trailer, the Cannes Film Festival teaser trailer, a short introduction from von Trier, and von Trier's 2016 announcement of the film's production.

== Reception ==
=== Box office ===
The House That Jack Built has grossed US$5,566,776.

=== Critical response ===
The film polarized critics, and was described as 2018's "most extreme and controversial" horror film. On Rotten Tomatoes, the film holds an approval rating of 59% based on 137 reviews, and an average rating of 6.2/10. The website's critical consensus reads, "The House That Jack Built presents writer-director Lars von Trier at his most proudly uncompromising: hard to ignore, and for many viewers, just as difficult to digest." On Metacritic, the film has a weighted average score of 42 out of 100 based on 29 critics, indicating "mixed or average reviews".

IndieWire critic Eric Kohn gave the film an "A−" and called the film a "wild masterpiece." BBC.com's Nicolas Barber gave the film four stars out of five and said "Undoubtedly a bold and stimulating film which no one but Denmark's notorious provocateur-auteur could have made." Owen Gleiberman from Variety gave the film a positive review, and stated "It's halfway between a subversive good movie and a stunt. It's designed to get under your skin, and does." David Rooney of The Hollywood Reporter wrote "The House That Jack Built is definitely something to see. But what's most surprising is that it's just as often inane as unsettling." Armond White says the film satirizes "guilt-free violence" by "rubbing the audience's face in the ugliness it enjoys." The Guardian's Peter Bradshaw referred to the film as "an ordeal of gruesomeness and tiresomeness", though he did praise its closing scene.

Mark Olsen of the Los Angeles Times criticized the film for reveling in "grisly, in-your-face violence and wan philosophical digressions," concluding, "Von Trier has managed to cobble together just enough of interest — odd moments, pieces of performance, stray ideas and the simple audacity of putting this mess out into the world, that it feels like there may be something there worth considering, a maddening possibility. And that may be his cruelest prank of all." Despite audience backlash toward a scene involving the main character's mutilation of a duckling when he was a child, PETA has defended the film in a statement praising its accurate portrayal of the link between adolescent animal abuse and psychopathy and for the realistic special effects.

The film's protagonist was compared by critics to real life serial killer Ted Bundy, specifically regarding Bundy's method of faking injuries to appear non-threatening, which Jack also does in the film.

According to Zinaida Pronchenko, "When the offended viewers who have moved on the wrong track hurry to the exit, Von Trier will not without satisfaction show the middle finger at their backs, and those who remain will witness the moralizing finale. Evil will be punished, thrown into the flaming abyss and will never return, as stated in the refrain of the song "Hit the Road Jack", cheerfully playing on the credits".

=== Accolades ===
The film was nominated for Art Cinema Award and Hamburg Producers Award at the 26th Hamburg Film Festival. It won Best European Film and was nominated for Best International Feature Film at the Strasbourg European Fantastic Film Festival. It won two awards in Canary Islands Fantastic Film Festival, Best Actor for Dillon and Best Screenplay for Von Trier. The film received the Best Director award at the 2018 Monster Fest in Melbourne, Australia. At the Robert Awards, the film received 11 nominations: Best Danish Film, Best Director, Best Original Screenplay, Best Actor, Best Production Design, Best Cinematography, Best Costume Design, Best Makeup, Best Editing, Best Sound Design and Best Visual Effects. It won two awards, Best Cinematography and Best Visual Effects. Dillon received a Best Actor nomination at the Bodil Awards, where the film won Best Production Design. The film is also nominated for Best Foreign Film at the Gopo Awards, and Dillon was a nominee in the Fangoria Chainsaw Awards' Best Actor category.

Cahiers du cinéma selected The House That Jack Built as the eighth-best film of 2018.
