= Robert Award for Best Short Featurette =

Danish film award

The Robert Award for Best Short Featurette was an award presented by the Danish Film Academy at the annual Robert Awards ceremony between 1987 and 2005 with several years where no award was given in the category.

== Honorees ==
=== 1980s ===
- 1987: Før gæsterne kommer – Jon Bang Carlsen
- 1988: En hård dags nat – Elisabeth Rygaard
- 1989: Nanna og Pernille – Eddie Thomas Petersen

=== 1990s ===
- 1990: Not awarded
- 1991: Not awarded
- 1992: Lille dreng på Østerbro - en film om by og barndom – Lasse Spang Olsen
- 1993: Not awarded
- 1994: Not awarded
- 1995: Fra hjertet til hånden – Tómas Gislason
- 1996: Not awarded
- 1997: Blomsterfangen – Jens Arentzen
- 1998: Royal blues – Lotte Svendsen
- 1999: Kys, kærlighed og kroner – Louise Andreasen

=== 2000s ===
- 2000: Solen er så rød – Jens Arentzen
- 2001: Anden juledag – Carsten Myllerup
- 2002: To Kvinder – Amir Rezazadeh
- 2003: Habibti min elskede – Pernille Fischer Christensen
- 2004: Lille far – Michael W. Horsten
- 2005: This Is Me Walking – Ulrik Wivel
