= Robert Award for Best Makeup =

Danish film award

The Robert Award for Best Makeup (Danish: Robert Prisen for årets sminkør) is an award presented by the Danish Film Academy at the annual Robert Awards ceremony. It has been handed out since 1987, but had no honorees in 1988, 1989, and 1991.

== Honorees ==
=== 1980s ===
- 1987: Erik Schiødt for Coeurs flambés
- 1988: Not awarded
- 1989: Not awarded

=== 1990s ===
- 1990: Birthe Lyngsøe and Lene Ravn Henriksen for Waltzing Regitze
- 1991: Not awarded
- 1992: Dennis Knudsen - The Boys from St. Petri
- 1993: Cecilia Drott for Sofie
- 1994: Dennis Knudsen and Anne Cathrine Sauerberg for Black Harvest
- 1995: Michael Sørensen for Nightwatch
- 1996: Elisabeth Bukkehave for The Beast Within (1995 film)
- 1997: Jennifer Jorfaid and Sanne Gravfort for Breaking the Waves
- 1998: Elisabeth Bukkehave for Eye of the Eagle
- 1999: Jeanne Müller for Nattens engel

=== 2000s ===
- 2000: John Janne Kindahl for The Magnetist's Fifth Winter
- 2001: Charlotte Laustsen for The Bench
- 2002: Agneta von Gegerfelt for Grev Axel
- 2003: June Pålgard and Elisabeth Bukkehave for I Am Dina
- 2004: Charlotte Laustsen for The Green Butchers
- 2005: Louise Hauberg Nielsen and Morten Jacobsen for Fakiren fra Bilbao
- 2006: Kamilla Bjerglind for Nordkraft
- 2007: Anne Katrine Sauerberg for A Soap
- 2008: Kamilla Bjerglind for Island of Lost Souls
- 2009: Sabine Schumann and Jens Bartram for Flame & Citron

=== 2010s ===
- 2010: Malin Birch-Jensen and Karina Åse for Kærestesorger
- 2011: Niamh Morrison for Valhalla Rising
- 2012: Lis Kasper Bang for Dirch
- 2013: Ivo Strangmüller and Dennis Knudsen for A Royal Affair
- 2014: Thomas Foldberg, Morten Jacobsen, and Lone Bidstrup Knudsen for Sex, Drugs & Taxation
- 2015: Louise Hauberg Lohmann, Thomas Foldberg and Morten Jacobsen for When Animals Dream
