= Robert Award for Best Screenplay =

Danish film award

The Robert Award for Best Screenplay (Danish: Robert Prisen for årets manuskript) is one of the merit awards presented by the Danish Film Academy at the annual Robert Awards ceremony. The award has been handed out since 1984, but except in 1991 and 1993. On two occasions, in 2005 and in 2015, the Academy handed out two awards in the category, one for best original screenplay (Danish: Årets originale manuskript), and one for best adapted screenplay (Danish: Årets adapterede manuskript).

Lars von Trier is the most wins in this category with six.

== Honorees ==
=== 1980s ===
- 1984: Nils Malmros for Beauty and the Beast
- 1985: Bjarne Reuter and Bille August for Twist and Shout
- 1986: Jon Bang Carlsen for Ofelia kommer til byen
- 1987: Helle Ryslinge for Flamberede hjerter
- 1988: Bille August for Pelle the Conqueror
- 1989: Søren Kragh-Jacobsen for Skyggen af Emma

=== 1990s ===
- 1990: Åke Sandgren and Stig Larsson for The Miracle in Valby
- 1991: Not awarded
- 1992: Marianne Goldman for Freud Leaving Home
- 1993: Not awarded
- 1994: Bille August for The House of the Spirits
- 1995: Lars von Trier and Niels Vørsel for The Kingdom
- 1996: Carsten Rudolf for The Beast Within
- 1997: Lars von Trier for Breaking the Waves
- 1998: Nikolaj Scherfig for Eye of the Eagle
- 1999: Thomas Vinterberg and Mogens Rukov for Festen

=== 2000s ===
- 2000: Kim Fupz Aakeson for The One and Only
  - Anders Thomas Jensen nominated for In China They Eat Dogs
  - Anders Thomas Jensen and Søren Kragh-Jacobsen nominated for Mifunes sidste sang
  - Ole Christian Madsen, Janus Nabil Bakrawi and Lars Andersen nominated for Pizza King
  - Lotte Svendsen and Elith Nulle Nykjær nominated for Bornholms stemme
  - Søren Frellesen and Dennis Jürgensen nominated for Love at First Hiccough
- 2001: Lone Scherfig for Italian for Beginners
  - Kim Leona and Per Fly nominated for Bænken
  - Anders Thomas Jensen nominated for Flickering Lights
  - Stefan Fjeldmark and Karsten Kiilerich nominated for Help! I'm a Fish
  - Kim Fupz Aakeson nominated for Mirakel
- 2002: Ole Christian Madsen and Mogens Rukov for Kira's Reason: A Love Story
  - Anders Thomas Jensen nominated for Grev Axel
- 2003: Nils Malmros and John Mogensen for At kende sandheden
  - Kim Fupz Aakeson nominated for Okay
  - Yüksel Isik nominated for Omfavn mig måne
  - Anders Thomas Jensen nominated for Old Men in New Cars
  - Nikolaj Arcel nominated for Klatretøsen
- 2004: Lars von Trier for Dogville
  - Per Fly, Kim Leona, Mogens Rukov and Dorte Warnø Høgh nominated for Arven
  - Anders Thomas Jensen nominated for The Green Butchers
  - Kim Leona nominated for Bagland
  - Bent Haller nominated for Drengen der ville gøre det umulige
- 2005: Anders Thomas Jensen for Brødre (Best original screenplay) & Nikolaj Arcel & Rasmus Heisterberg for King's Game (Best adapted screenplay)
  - Simon Staho and Peter Asmussen nominated for Dag och natt
  - Kim Fupz Aakeson and Annette K. Olesen nominated for In Your Hands
  - Kim Fupz Aakeson nominated for Lad de små børn...
  - Nicolas Winding Refn nominated for Pusher II
- 2006: Anders Thomas Jensen for Adam's Apples
  - Per Fly, Kim Leona, Mogens Rukov and Dorte Warnø Høgh nominated for Drabet
  - Åke Sandgren nominated for Fluerne på væggen
  - Lars von Trier nominated for Manderlay
  - Dagur Kári and Rune Schjøtt nominated for Voksne mennesker
- 2007: Niels Arden Oplev and Steen Bille for Drømmen
  - Lars von Trier nominated for The Boss of It All
  - Anders Thomas Jensen nominated for Efter brylluppet
  - Kim Fupz Aakeson nominated for Rene hjerter
  - Kim Fupz Aakeson and Pernille Fischer Christensen nominated for A Soap
  - Christoffer Boe and Knud Romer Jørgensen nominated for Offscreen
- 2008: Bo Hr. Hansen for The Art of Crying
  - Mette Heeno and Anders Morgenthaler nominated for Echo
  - Peter Asmussen and Simon Staho nominated for Daisy Diamond
  - Ole Bornedal nominated for Just Another Love Story
  - Anders Thomas Jensen and Jannik Johansen nominated for Hvid nat
- 2009: Dunja Gry Jensen and Henrik Ruben Genz for Terribly Happy
  - Kristian Levring and Anders Thomas Jensen nominated for Fear Me Not
  - Rasmus Heisterberg and Nikolaj Arcel nominated for Journey to Saturn
  - Lars Andersen and Ole Christian Madsen nominated for Flammen og Citronen
  - Niels Arden Oplev and Steen Bille nominated for To verdener

=== 2010s ===
- 2010: Lars von Trier for Antichrist
  - Ole Bornedal nominated for Deliver Us from Evil
  - Rumle Hammerich nominated for Headhunter
  - Nils Malmros and John Mogensen nominated for Himlen falder
  - Nikolaj Steen nominated for Oldboys
- 2011: Tobias Lindholm and Michael Noer for R
  - Tobias Lindholm and Thomas Vinterberg nominated for Submarino
  - Anders Thomas Jensen nominated for In a Better World
  - Nikolaj Arcel and Rasmus Heisterberg nominated for Truth About Men
  - Nicolas Winding Refn and Roy Jacobsen nominated for Valhalla Rising
- 2012: Lars von Trier for Melancholia
  - Kim Fupz Aakeson and Pernille Fischer Christensen nominated for A Family
  - Anders August and Martin Zandvliet nominated for A Funny Man
  - Morten Kirkskov, Carlos Augusto de Oliveira and Jens Dahl nominated for Rosa Morena
  - Ole Christian Madsen and Anders August nominated for SuperClásico
- 2013: Tobias Lindholm for A Hijacking
  - Anders Thomas Jensen nominated for Love Is All You Need
  - Lotte Svendsen, Mette Horn and David Sandreuter nominated for Max Pinlig 3 på Roskilde
  - Marie Østerbye and Christian Torpe nominated for Sover Dolly på ryggen?
  - Nikolaj Arcel and Rasmus Heisterberg nominated for A Royal Affair
- 2014: Thomas Vinterberg and Tobias Lindholm for The Hunt
  - Nikolaj Arcel nominated for Kvinden i buret
  - Rasmus Heisterberg and Michael Noer nominated for Nordvest
  - Nils Malmros and John Mogensen nominated for Sorg og glæde
  - Simon Pasternak and Christoffer Boe nominated for Spies & Glistrup
- 2015: Lars von Trier for Nymphomaniac Director's Cut (Best original screenplay); Lærke Sanderhoff and Søren Balle for The Sunfish (Best adapted screenplay)
  - Christian Torpe nominated for Stille hjerte
  - Kim Fupz Aakeson and Pernille Fischer Christensen nominated for En du elsker
  - Mette Heeno nominated for All Inclusive
  - Rasmus Birch nominated for When Animals Dream
- 2016: Martin Zandvliet – Land of Mine
  - Anders August and Kasper Barfoed nominated for Sommeren '92
  - Anders Thomas Jensen nominated for Men & Chicken
  - Maren Louise Käehne and May el-Toukhy nominated for Lang historie kort
  - Tobias Lindholm nominated for Krigen
- 2017: Søren Sveistrup for Der kommer en dag
  - Rasmus Heisterberg nominated for In the Blood
  - Christian Tafdrup nominated for Parents
  - Ali Abbasi and Maren Louise Käehne nominated for Shelley
  - Nicolas Winding Refn, Mary Laws, Polly Stenham nominated for The Neon Demon
- 2018: Christian Tafdrup and Mads Tafdrup for En frygtelig kvinde
  - Fenar Ahmad and Adam August nominated for Underverden
  - Dunja Gry Jensen nominated for QEDA
  - Annika Berg nominated for Team Hurricane
  - Hlynur Pálmason nominated for Vinterbrødre
- 2019: Gustav Möller and Emil Nygaard Albertsen for The Guilty
  - Jakob Weis nominated for That Time of Year
  - Ditte Hansen and Louise Mieritz nominated for Ditte & Louise
  - Johanne Algren and Isabella Eklöf nominated for Holiday
  - Lars von Trier nominated for The House That Jack Built

=== 2020s ===
- 2020: Maren Louise Käehne and May el-Toukhy for Dronningen
  - Ulaa Salim nominated for Danmarks sønner
  - Jesper Fink, Michael Noer nominated for Før frosten
  - Marie Grahtø Sørensen nominated for Psychosia
  - René Frelle Petersen nominated for Uncle
- 2021: Thomas Vinterberg and Tobias Lindholm for Druk
  - Anders Thomas Jensen nominated for Riders of Justice
  - Anders Ølholm and Frederik Louis Hviid nominated for Shorta
  - Ingeborg Topsøe nominated for Kød & Blod
  - Malou Reymann nominated for A Perfectly Normal Family
- 2022: Sara Isabella Jønsson and Lisa Jespersen for Hvor kragerne vender
  - Jesper Fink, Maya Ilsøe and Charlotte Sieling for Margrete: Queen of the North
  - Ole Bornedal for The Shadow in My Eye
  - Christoffer Boe and Tobias Lindholm for A Taste of Hunger
  - Anna Emma Haudal for The Venus Effect
- 2023: Martin Dirkov for Holy Spider
  - Johan Carøe for Attachment
  - Ida Duelund and Maria Jagd for Baby Pyramid
  - Kaspar Kaae for Chrysanthemum
  - Uno Helmersson for A House Made of Splinters
  - Sune "Køter" Kølster for Speak No Evil

== See also ==
- Bodil Award for Best Screenplay
