= 24th Robert Awards =

2007 Danish film awards ceremony

- Date: 2007
- Organized by: Danish Film Academy

The 24th Robert Awards ceremony was held in 2007 in Copenhagen, Denmark. Organized by the Danish Film Academy, the awards honoured the best in Danish and foreign film of 2006.

== Honorees ==
=== Best Danish Film ===
- Drømmen – Niels Arden Oplev

=== Best Children's Film ===
- Supervoksen – Christina Rosendahl

=== Best Director ===
- Niels Arden Oplev – Drømmen

=== Best Screenplay ===
- Niels Arden Oplev & Steen Bille – Drømmen

=== Best Actor in a Leading Role ===
- David Dencik – A Soap

=== Best Actress in a Leading Role ===
- Trine Dyrholm – A Soap

=== Best Actor in a Supporting Role ===
- Bent Mejding – Drømmen

=== Best Actress in a Supporting Role ===
- Stine Fischer Christensen – After the Wedding

=== Best Cinematography ===
- Jørgen Johansson – Prag

=== Best Production Design ===
- Peter De Neergaard – Der var en gang en dreng

=== Best Costume Design ===
- Manon Rasmussen – Drømmen

=== Best Makeup ===
- Anne Katrine Sauerberg – A Soap

=== Best Special Effects ===
- Thomas Dyg – The Lost Treasure of the Knights Templar

=== Best Sound Design ===
- Hans Møller – Prag

=== Best Editing ===
- Åsa Mossberg – Prag

=== Best Score ===
- Jeppe Kaas & Mikael Simpson – Rene hjerter

=== Best Song ===
- "Jeg vil have en baby" – Der var en gang en dreng

=== Non-American Film ===
- The Lives of Others – Florian Henckel von Donnersmarck

=== Best American Film ===
- Babel – Alejandro González Iñárritu

=== Best Short Fiction/Animation ===
- Partus – Mikkel Munch-Fals

=== Best Long Fiction/Animation ===
- Liv – Heidi Maria Faisst

=== Best Documentary Short ===
- Lyd på liv – Iben Haahr Andersen & Katia Forbert Petersen

=== Best Documentary Feature ===
- Menneskenes land - Anne Wivel

== See also ==
- 2007 Bodil Awards
