= 22nd Robert Awards =

2005 Danish film awards ceremony

- Date: 2005
- Organized by: Danish Film Academy

The 22nd Robert Awards ceremony was held in 2005 in Copenhagen, Denmark. Organized by the Danish Film Academy, the awards honoured the best in Danish and foreign film of 2004.

== Honorees ==
=== Best Danish Film ===
- King's Game – Nikolaj Arcel

=== Best Children's Film ===
- Terkel in Trouble – Stefan Fjeldmark, Kresten Vestbjerg Andersen & Thorbjørn Christoffersen

=== Best Director ===
- Nikolaj Arcel – King's Game

=== Best Screenplay ===
- Anders Thomas Jensen – Brothers (Best original screenplay)
- Nikolaj Arcel & Rasmus Heisterberg – King's Game (Best adapted screenplay)

=== Best Actor in a Leading Role ===
- Mads Mikkelsen – Pusher II

=== Best Actress in a Leading Role ===
- Sofie Gråbøl – Aftermath

=== Best Actor in a Supporting Role ===
- Søren Pilmark – King's Game

=== Best Actress in a Supporting Role ===
- Trine Dyrholm – In Your Hands

=== Best Cinematography ===
- Rasmus Videbæk – King's Game

=== Best Production Design ===
- Niels Sejer – King's Game

=== Best Costume Design ===
- Helle Nielsen – King's Game

=== Best Makeup ===
- Louise Hauberg Nielsen & Morten Jacobsen – Fakiren fra Bilbao

=== Best Special Effects ===
- Daniel Silwerfeldt & Thomas Borch Nielsen – Fakiren fra Bilbao

=== Best Sound Design ===
- Nalle Hansen – Terkel in Trouble

=== Best Editing ===
- Mikkel E. G. Nielsen – King's Game

=== Best Score ===
- Bossy Bo - Terkel in Trouble

=== Best Song ===
- Anders Matthesen – "Paranoia" – Terkel in Trouble

=== Non-American Film ===
- Evil – Mikael Håfström

=== Best American Film ===
- Lost in Translation – Sofia Coppola

=== Best Documentary Short ===
- Biernes by – Laila Hodell & Bertel Torne

=== Best Documentary Feature ===
- The Swenkas – Jeppe Rønde

=== Best Short Featurette ===
- This Is Me Walking – Ulrik Wivel

=== Audience Award ===
- Terkel in Trouble

=== Special Jury Prize (Short) ===
- Max Kestner – Nede på jorden

== See also ==
- 2005 Bodil Awards
