= Robert Award for Best Sound Design =

Danish film award

The Robert Award for Best Sound Design (Danish: Robert Prisen for årets sounddesigner) is one of the merit awards presented by the Danish Film Academy at the annual Robert Awards ceremony. The award has been handed out since 1984.

== Honorees ==
=== 1980s ===
- 1984: Jan Juhler for Thunderbirds
- 1985: Morten Degnbol for The Element of Crime
- 1986: Niels Arild Nielsen and Niels Bokkenheuser for De flyvende djævle
- 1987: Peter Hesse Overgaard for Coeurs flambés
- 1988: Niels Arild Nielsen and Lars Lund for Pelle the Conqueror
- 1989: Niels Arild Nielsen for Himmel og helvede

=== 1990s ===
- 1990: Niels Arild Nielsen for Århus by Night
- 1991: Niels Arild Nielsen for War of the Birds
- 1992: Per Streit Jensen for Europa
- 1993: Niels Arild Nielsen for Pain of Love
- 1994: Niels Arild Nielsen for The House of the Spirits
- 1995: Per Streit Jensen for Riget
- 1996: Hans Møller for The Beast Within (1995 film)
- 1997: Per Streit Jensen for Breaking the Waves
- 1998: Morten Degnbol and Stig Sparre-Ulrich for Eye of the Eagle
- 1999: Per Streit Jensen for Heart of Light

=== 2000s ===
- 2000: Niels Arild Nielsen for The Magnetist's Fifth Winter
- 2001: Per Streit Jensen for Dancer in the Dark
- 2002: Nino Jacobsen for Shake It All About
- 2003: Michael Dela & Nino Jacobsen for I Am Dina
- 2004: Morten Green for Reconstruction
- 2005: Nalle Hansen for Terkel in Trouble
- 2006: Hans Møller for Nordkraft
- 2007: Hans Møller for Prag
- 2008: Hans Christian Kock and Claus Lynge for Island of Lost Souls
- 2009: Hans Møller for Flame & Citron

=== 2010s ===
- 2010: Kristian Eidnes Andersen for Antichrist
- 2011: Morten Green for R
- 2012: Kristian Eidnes Andersen for Melancholia
- 2013: Morten Green for A Hijacking
- 2014: Kristian Eidnes Andersen for Only God Forgives
- 2015: Kristian Eidnes Andersen for Nymphomaniac Director's Cut
