= Robert Award for Best Foreign Film =

Danish film award

The Robert Award for Best Foreign Film was an award presented by the Danish Film Academy at the annual Robert Awards ceremony between 1984 and 1996, bar 1988 and 1989.

The award was succeeded by the Robert Award for Best Non-American Film (from 1997) and the Robert Award for Best American Film (from 1999).

== Honorees ==
=== 1980s ===
- 1984: Sophie's Choice – Alan J. Pakula
- 1985: Amadeus – Miloš Forman
- 1986: False as Water – Hans Alfredson
- 1987: My Life as a Dog – Lasse Hallström
- 1988: Not awarded
- 1989: Not awarded

=== 1990s ===
- 1990: A Short Film About Killing – Krzysztof Kieślowski
- 1991: Cinema Paradiso – Giuseppe Tornatore
- 1992: Dances with Wolves – Kevin Costner
- 1993: Strictly Ballroom – Baz Luhrmann
- 1994: The Piano – Jane Campion
- 1995: Remains of the Day – James Ivory
- 1996: Smoke – Wayne Wang
