= List of accolades received by The Hours =

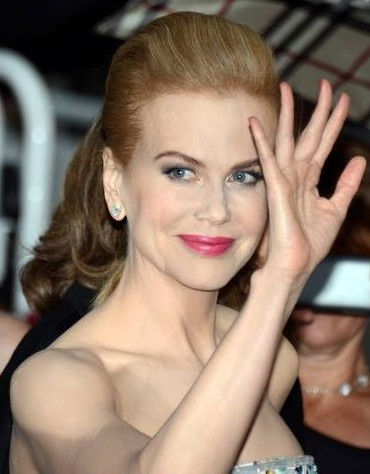
- Nicole Kidman received several nominations for her portrayal of writer Virginia Woolf, and went on to win the Academy Award for Best Actress.
Awards and nominations
Award	Won	Nominated
AARP Movies for Grownups Awards	1	3
Academy Awards	1	9
Amanda Awards	1	1
American Cinema Editors	0	1
American Film Institute Awards	1	1
Art Directors Guild	0	1
Australian Film Institute	0	1
Berlin International Film Festival	1	2
Bodil Awards	0	1
Boston Society of Film Critics	1	2
British Academy Film Awards	2	11
Broadcast Film Critics Association	0	4
Casting Society of America	1	1
César Awards	0	1
Chicago Film Critics Association	0	3
Dallas–Fort Worth Film Critics Association	0	2
Deutscher Filmpreis	1	1
Directors Guild of America Awards	0	1
Evening Standard British Film Awards	1	1
GLAAD Media Awards	1	1
Golden Globe Awards	2	7
Golden Trailer Awards	1	2
Grammy Awards	0	1
London Film Critics' Circle	1	6
Los Angeles Film Critics Association	1	2
National Board of Review	1	1
Outfest	1	1
Robert Awards	1	1
Satellite Awards	0	5
Screen Actors Guild Awards	0	4
Toronto Film Critics Association	0	1
USC Scripter Awards	1	1
Vancouver Film Critics Circle	3	5
World Soundtrack Awards	0	2
Writers Guild of America Awards	1	1
- Total number of wins and nominations
Totals	25	88
- References

The Hours is a 2002 drama film directed by Stephen Daldry and written by David Hare. The screenplay is based on the novel of the same name by Michael Cunningham, which follows three generations of women whose lives are affected by the novel Mrs Dalloway: Virginia Woolf (Nicole Kidman), as she writes the novel in 1923, a suicidal 1950s housewife (Julianne Moore), and a modern-day woman (Meryl Streep) preparing a party for her poet friend, Richard (Ed Harris). The film premiered on December 25, 2002, followed by a limited theatrical release on December 27, and then went on a wide release in North America on January 14, 2003. The Hours grossed a worldwide box office total of over $108 million, against an estimated budget of $25 million.

The Hours garnered various awards and nominations following its release, with nominations ranging from recognition of the film itself to Hare's screenplay, Philip Glass' score and the cast's acting performances, particularly those of Kidman, Moore and Streep. The film received nine nominations at the 75th Academy Awards; Kidman won the Best Actress award at the ceremony. At the 56th British Academy Film Awards, The Hours won two awards from eleven nominations. It earned seven nominations at the 60th Golden Globe Awards, and went on to win the Best Drama Film and Best Actress accolades. It was also named Best Foreign Feature Film at the Amanda Awards.

During the Berlin International Film Festival, Kidman, Moore and Streep tied for the Silver Bear for Best Actress. Film editor Peter Boyle received an American Cinema Editors nomination for his work, and casting director Daniel Swee won the Casting Society of America's Best Drama Film Casting accolade. The Deutscher Filmpreis awarded The Hours Best Foreign Film, while the GLAAD Media Awards named it Outstanding Wide Release Film. Moore earned a Best Actress award from the Los Angeles Film Critics Association, while Streep was given the award for Best Performance by an Actress in a Leading Role from Outfest, an LGBT-oriented film festival.

The film was nominated for a total of eight awards from the 7th Golden Satellite Award and 9th Screen Actors Guild Award ceremonies. The Hours won three Vancouver Film Critics Circle Awards from five nominations, including Best Supporting Actress for Toni Collette. Collette also won the Boston Society of Film Critics Award for Best Supporting Actress. Hare and Cunningham were given the 2002 USC Scripter Award for Best Screenplay. The Writers Guild of America named Hare the winner of the Best Adapted Screenplay award, while the London Film Critics' Circle named him British Screenwriter of the Year.

== Accolades ==
Award	Date of ceremony	Category	Recipient(s)	Result	Ref(s)
AARP Movies for Grownups Awards	March 11, 2003	Best Movie for Grownups	The Hours	Nominated	
AARP Movies for Grownups Awards	March 11, 2003	Best Screenwriter	David Hare	Won	
AARP Movies for Grownups Awards	March 11, 2003	Best Intergenerational Film	The Hours	Nominated	
Academy Awards	March 23, 2003	Best Picture	Scott Rudin and Robert Fox	Nominated	
Academy Awards	March 23, 2003	Best Director	Stephen Daldry	Nominated	
Academy Awards	March 23, 2003	Best Actress	Nicole Kidman	Won	
Academy Awards	March 23, 2003	Best Supporting Actor	Ed Harris	Nominated	
Academy Awards	March 23, 2003	Best Supporting Actress	Julianne Moore	Nominated	
Academy Awards	March 23, 2003	Best Adapted Screenplay	David Hare	Nominated	
Academy Awards	March 23, 2003	Best Costume Design	Ann Roth	Nominated	
Academy Awards	March 23, 2003	Best Film Editing	Peter Boyle	Nominated	
Academy Awards	March 23, 2003	Best Original Score	Philip Glass	Nominated	
Amanda Awards	August 22, 2003	Best Foreign Feature Film	The Hours	Won	
American Cinema Editors	February 23, 2003	Best Edited Feature Film – Dramatic	Peter Boyle	Nominated	
American Film Institute Awards	December 16, 2002	Top Ten Movies of the Year	The Hours	Won	
Art Directors Guild	February 22, 2003	Excellence in Production Design for a Contemporary Film	The Hours	Nominated	
Australian Film Institute	November 21, 2003	Best Foreign Film	The Hours	Nominated	
Berlin International Film Festival	February 6–16, 2003	Golden Bear for Best Film	The Hours	Nominated	
Berlin International Film Festival	February 6–16, 2003	Silver Bear for Best Actress	Nicole Kidman, Julianne Moore, Meryl Streep	Won	
Bodil Awards	March 7, 2004	Best American Film	The Hours	Nominated	
Boston Society of Film Critics	December 15, 2002	Best Supporting Actress	Toni Collette (Note: Also for her work in About a Boy)	Won	
Boston Society of Film Critics	December 15, 2002	Best Supporting Actor	John C. Reilly (Note: Also for his work in Chicago, Gangs of New York, The Good Girl)	Nominated	
British Academy Film Awards	February 23, 2003	Best Film	The Hours	Nominated	
British Academy Film Awards	February 23, 2003	Best British Film	The Hours	Nominated	
British Academy Film Awards	February 23, 2003	Best Director	Stephen Daldry	Nominated	
British Academy Film Awards	February 23, 2003	Best Adapted Screenplay	David Hare	Nominated	
British Academy Film Awards	February 23, 2003	Best Actress	Nicole Kidman	Won	
British Academy Film Awards	February 23, 2003	Best Actress	Meryl Streep	Nominated	
British Academy Film Awards	February 23, 2003	Best Supporting Actor	Ed Harris	Nominated	
British Academy Film Awards	February 23, 2003	Best Supporting Actress	Julianne Moore	Nominated	
British Academy Film Awards	February 23, 2003	Best Editing	Peter Boyle	Nominated	
British Academy Film Awards	February 23, 2003	Best Film Music	Philip Glass	Won	
British Academy Film Awards	February 23, 2003	Best Makeup and Hair	Jo Allen, Conor O'Sullivan, Ivana Primorac	Nominated	
Broadcast Film Critics Association	January 17, 2003	Best Picture	The Hours	Nominated	
Broadcast Film Critics Association	January 17, 2003	Best Actress	Nicole Kidman	Nominated	
Broadcast Film Critics Association	January 17, 2003	Best Acting Ensemble	The Hours	Nominated	
Broadcast Film Critics Association	January 17, 2003	Best Score	Philip Glass	Nominated	
Casting Society of America	October 9, 2003	Best Drama Film Casting	Daniel Swee	Won	
César Awards	February 21, 2004	Best Foreign Film	The Hours	Nominated	
Chicago Film Critics Association	January 8, 2003	Best Actress	Nicole Kidman	Nominated	
Chicago Film Critics Association	January 8, 2003	Best Supporting Actress	Julianne Moore	Nominated	
Chicago Film Critics Association	January 8, 2003	Best Original Score	Philip Glass	Nominated	
Dallas–Fort Worth Film Critics Association	January 6, 2003	Best Actress	Nicole Kidman	Nominated	
Dallas–Fort Worth Film Critics Association	January 6, 2003	Best Supporting Actor	Ed Harris	Nominated	
Deutscher Filmpreis	June 6, 2003	Best Foreign Film	The Hours	Won	
Directors Guild of America Awards	March 1, 2003	Outstanding Directing in a Feature Film	Stephen Daldry	Nominated	
Evening Standard British Film Awards	February 1, 2004	Technical Achievement	Seamus McGarvey	Won	
GLAAD Media Awards	May 31, 2003	Outstanding Film – Wide Release	The Hours	Won	
Golden Globe Awards	January 19, 2003	Best Motion Picture – Drama	The Hours	Won	
Golden Globe Awards	January 19, 2003	Best Director	Stephen Daldry	Nominated	
Golden Globe Awards	January 19, 2003	Best Screenplay	David Hare	Nominated	
Golden Globe Awards	January 19, 2003	Best Actress in a Motion Picture – Drama	Nicole Kidman	Won	
Golden Globe Awards	January 19, 2003	Best Actress in a Motion Picture – Drama	Meryl Streep	Nominated	
Golden Globe Awards	January 19, 2003	Best Supporting Actor – Motion Picture	Ed Harris	Nominated	
Golden Globe Awards	January 19, 2003	Best Original Score	Philip Glass	Nominated	
Golden Trailer Awards	March 13, 2003	Best Drama	The Hours and Giaronomo Productions	Won	
Golden Trailer Awards	March 13, 2003	Best of Show	The Hours and Giaronomo Productions	Nominated	
Grammy Awards	February 8, 2004	Best Score Soundtrack for Visual Media	Philip Glass	Nominated	
London Film Critics' Circle	February 11, 2004	Film of the Year	The Hours	Nominated	
London Film Critics' Circle	February 11, 2004	British Film of the Year	The Hours	Nominated	
London Film Critics' Circle	February 11, 2004	British Director of the Year	Stephen Daldry	Nominated	
London Film Critics' Circle	February 11, 2004	British Screenwriter of the Year	David Hare	Won	
London Film Critics' Circle	February 11, 2004	Actor of the Year	Ed Harris	Nominated	
London Film Critics' Circle	February 11, 2004	British Supporting Actor of the Year	Stephen Dillane	Nominated	
Los Angeles Film Critics Association	December 15, 2002	Best Actress	Julianne Moore	Won	
Los Angeles Film Critics Association	December 15, 2002	Best Music	Philip Glass	Nominated	
National Board of Review	December 4, 2002	Best Film	The Hours	Won	
Outfest	July 21, 2003	Best Performance by an Actress in a Leading Role	Meryl Streep	Won	
Robert Awards	February 1, 2004	Best American Film	The Hours	Won	
Satellite Awards	January 12, 2003	Best Film – Drama	The Hours	Nominated	
Satellite Awards	January 12, 2003	Best Director	Stephen Daldry	Nominated	
Satellite Awards	January 12, 2003	Best Actress in a Motion Picture – Drama	Nicole Kidman	Nominated	
Satellite Awards	January 12, 2003	Best Actress in a Motion Picture – Drama	Meryl Streep	Nominated	
Satellite Awards	January 12, 2003	Best Supporting Actress – Motion Picture	Julianne Moore	Nominated	
Screen Actors Guild Awards	March 9, 2003	Outstanding Performance by a Female Actor in a Leading Role	Nicole Kidman	Nominated	
Screen Actors Guild Awards	March 9, 2003	Outstanding Performance by a Male Actor in a Supporting Role	Ed Harris	Nominated	
Screen Actors Guild Awards	March 9, 2003	Outstanding Performance by a Female Actor in a Supporting Role	Julianne Moore	Nominated	
Screen Actors Guild Awards	March 9, 2003	Outstanding Performance by a Cast in a Motion Picture	The Hours	Nominated	
Toronto Film Critics Association	December 18, 2002	Best Adapted Screenplay	David Hare	Nominated	
USC Scripter Awards	March 15, 2003	Best Screenplay	David Hare and Michael Cunningham	Won	
Vancouver Film Critics Circle	January 30, 2003	Best Film	The Hours	Won	
Vancouver Film Critics Circle	January 30, 2003	Best Director	Stephen Daldry	Won	
Vancouver Film Critics Circle	January 30, 2003	Best Actress	Nicole Kidman	Nominated	
Vancouver Film Critics Circle	January 30, 2003	Best Actress	Meryl Streep	Nominated	
Vancouver Film Critics Circle	January 30, 2003	Best Supporting Actress	Toni Collette	Won	
World Soundtrack Awards	October 11, 2003	Best Original Score of the Year	Philip Glass	Nominated	
World Soundtrack Awards	October 11, 2003	Soundtrack Composer of the Year	Philip Glass	Nominated	
Writers Guild of America Awards	March 8, 2003	Best Adapted Screenplay	David Hare	Won	
