= Robert Award for Best Costume Design =

Danish film award

The Robert Award for Best Costume Design (Danish: Robert Prisen for årets kostumier) is one of the merit awards presented by the Danish Film Academy at the annual Robert Awards ceremony. The award has been handed out since 1984, except in 1988 and 1991.

== Honorees ==
=== 1980s ===
- 1984: Annelise Hauberg for Forræderne
- 1985: Manon Rasmussen for The Element of Crime
- 1986: Evelyn Olsson & Jette Termann for Hodja fra Pjort
- 1987: Manon Rasmussen for Early Spring
- 1988: Not awarded
- 1989: Annelise Hauberg for Katinka

=== 1990s ===
- 1990: Manon Rasmussen for The Miracle in Valby
- 1991: Not awarded
- 1992: Manon Rasmussen for The Boys from St. Petri
- 1993: Jette Termann for Sofie
- 1994: Manon Rasmussen for Black Harvest
- 1995: Manon Rasmussen for My Childhood Symphony
- 1996: Manon Rasmussen for Kun en pige
- 1997: Lotte Dandanell for Hamsun
- 1998: Manon Rasmussen for Eye of the Eagle
- 1999: Ingrid Søe for Forbudt for børn

=== 2000s ===
- 2000: Katja Watkins for The Magnetist's Fifth Winter
- 2001: Louize Nissen for The Bench
- 2002: Stine Gudmundsen-Holmgreen for Grev Axel
- 2003: Dominique Borg for I Am Dina
- 2004: Manon Rasmussen for Dogville
- 2005: Helle Nielsen for King's Game
- 2006: Manon Rasmussen for Young Andersen
- 2007: Manon Rasmussen for Drømmen
- 2008: Margrethe Rasmussen for The Art of Crying
- 2009: Manon Rasmussen for Flame & Citron

=== 2010s ===
- 2010: Anne-Dorte Fischer for Kærestesorger
- 2011: Margrethe Rasmussen for Submarino
- 2012: Stine Gudmundsen-Holmgreen for Dirch
- 2013: Manon Rasmussen for A Royal Affair
- 2014: Manon Rasmussen for Sex, Drugs & Taxation
- 2015: Manon Rasmussen for Nymphomaniac Director's Cut
- 2016: Kicki Ilander for The Shamer's Daughter
- 2017: Stine Thaning for Der kommer en dag
- 2018: Nina Grønlund for Vinterbrødre
- 2019: Manon Rasmussen for A Fortunate Man

=== 2020s ===
- 2020: Louize Nissen for Before the Frost
- 2021: Edit Szűcs for The Good Traitor
- 2022: Manon Rasmussen for Margrete: Queen of the North
- 2023: Nina Grønlund for Godland
- 2024: Queen Margrethe II of Denmark for Ehrengard: The Art of Seduction
- 2025: Nina Grønlund for Madame Ida
- 2026: Małgorzata Fudala for The Girl with the Needle
