= 15th Robert Awards =

1998 Danish film awards ceremony

- Date: 1998
- Organized by: Danish Film Academy

The 15th Robert Awards ceremony was held in 1998 in Copenhagen, Denmark. Organized by the Danish Film Academy, the awards honoured the best in Danish and foreign film of 1997.

== Honorees ==
=== Best Danish Film ===
- Barbara by Nils Malmros & Let's Get Lost by Jonas Elmer

=== Best Screenplay ===
- Nikolaj Scherfig – Eye of the Eagle

=== Best Actor in a Leading Role ===
- Lars Simonsen – Barbara

=== Best Actress in a Leading Role ===
- Sidse Babett Knudsen – Let's Get Lost

=== Best Actor in a Supporting Role ===
- Jesper Christensen – Barbara

=== Best Actress in a Supporting Role ===
- Ellen Hillingsø – Sekten

=== Best Cinematography ===
- Jan Weincke – Barbara

=== Best Production Design ===
- Norbert Scherer – Øen i Fuglegaden

=== Best Costume Design ===
- Manon Rasmussen – Eye of the Eagle

=== Best Makeup ===
- Elisabeth Bukkehave – Eye of the Eagle

=== Robert Award for Best Light ===
- Otto Stenov – Barbara

=== Best Sound Design ===
- Morten Degnbol & Stig Sparre-Ulrich – Eye of the Eagle

=== Best Editing ===
- Morten Giese, Jakob Thuesen & Per K. Kirkegaard for Eye of the Eagle & Sekten

=== Best Score ===
- Nikolaj Egelund & Povl Kristian – Let's Get Lost

=== Best Documentary Short ===
- Patriotene – Tómas Gislason

=== Best Short Featurette ===
- Royal Blues – Lotte Svendsen

=== Non-American Film ===
- The Full Monty – Peter Cattaneo

=== Special Jury Prize (Short) ===
- Henning Bahs

== See also ==
- 1998 Bodil Awards
