= 2nd Robert Awards =

1985 Danish film awards ceremony

- Date: 31 March 1985
- Organized by: Danish Film Academy

Highlights
- Best Film: The Element of Crime
- Most awards: The Element of Crime (7)
- Most nominations: The Element of Crime (7)

The 2nd Robert Awards ceremony was held on 31 March 1985 in Copenhagen, Denmark. Organized by the Danish Film Academy, the awards honoured the best in Danish and foreign film of 1984.

== Honorees ==
=== Best Danish Film ===
- The Element of Crime – Lars von Trier

=== Best Screenplay ===
- Bjarne Reuter & Bille August – Twist and Shout

=== Best Actor in a Leading Role ===
- Lars Simonsen – Twist and Shout

=== Best Actress in a Leading Role ===
- Bodil Udsen – Min farmors hus

=== Best Actor in a Supporting Role ===
- Bent Mejding – Twist and Shout

=== Best Actress in a Supporting Role ===
- Aase Hansen – Twist and Shout

=== Best Cinematography ===
- Tom Elling – The Element of Crime

=== Best Production Design ===
- Peter Høimark – The Element of Crime

=== Best Costume Design ===
- Manon Rasmussen – The Element of Crime

=== Best Special Effects ===
- Peter Høimark – The Element of Crime

=== Best Editing ===
- Tómas Gislason – The Element of Crime

=== Best Sound Design ===
- Morten Degnbol – The Element of Crime

=== Best Score ===
- Kim Larsen – Midt om natten

=== Best Documentary Short ===
- Fugl Fønix – Jon Bang Carlsen

=== Best Foreign Film ===
- Amadeus – Miloš Forman

== See also ==
- 1985 Bodil Awards
