= 12th Robert Awards =

1995 Danish film awards ceremony

- Date: 1995
- Organized by: Danish Film Academy

The 12th Robert Awards ceremony was held in 1995 in Copenhagen, Denmark. Organized by the Danish Film Academy, the awards honoured the best in Danish and foreign film of 1994.

== Honorees ==
=== Best Danish Film ===
- Nattevagten – Ole Bornedal

=== Best Screenplay ===
- Lars von Trier & Niels Vørsel – Riget

=== Best Actor in a Leading Role ===
- Ernst-Hugo Järegård – Riget

=== Best Actress in a Leading Role ===
- Kirsten Rolffes – Riget

=== Best Actor in a Supporting Role ===
- Kim Bodnia – Nattevagten

=== Best Actress in a Supporting Role ===
- Rikke Louise Andersson – Nattevagten

=== Best Cinematography ===
- Eric Kress – Riget

=== Production Design ===
- Palle Arestrup – My Childhood Symphony

=== Best Costume Design ===
- Manon Rasmussen – My Childhood Symphony

=== Best Makeup ===
- Michael Sørensen – Nattevagten

=== Best Sound Design ===
- Per Streit – Riget

=== Best Editing ===
- Camilla Skousen – Nattevagten

=== Best Score ===
- Joachim Holbek – Riget

=== Best Documentary Short ===
- Drengen der gik baglæns – Thomas Vinterberg

=== Best Short Featurette ===
- Fra hjertet til hånden – Tómas Gislason

=== Best Foreign Film ===
- Remains of the Day – James Ivory

=== Special Jury Prize (Short) ===
- Claus Loof (posthumously)

== See also ==
- 1995 Bodil Awards
