= 23rd Robert Awards =

2006 Danish film awards ceremony

- Date: 2006
- Organized by: Danish Film Academy

The 23rd Robert Awards ceremony was held in 2006 in Copenhagen, Denmark. Organized by the Danish Film Academy, the awards honoured the best in Danish and foreign film of 2005.

== Honorees ==
=== Best Danish Film ===
- Adam's Apples – Anders Thomas Jensen

=== Best Children's Film ===
- Strings – Anders Rønnow Klarlund

=== Best Director ===
- Per Fly – Manslaughter

=== Best Screenplay ===
- Anders Thomas Jensen – Adam's Apples

=== Best Actor in a Leading Role ===
- Troels Lyby – Accused

=== Best Actress in a Leading Role ===
- Sofie Gråbøl – Accused

=== Best Actor in a Supporting Role ===
- Thure Lindhardt – Nordkraft (film)

=== Best Actress in a Supporting Role ===
- Charlotte Fich – Manslaughter

=== Best Cinematography ===
- Manuel Claro – Allegro

=== Best Production Design ===
- Jette Lehmann – Nordkraft (film)

=== Best Costume Design ===
- Manon Rasmussen – Young Andersen

=== Best Makeup ===
- Kamilla Bjerglind – Nordkraft (film)

=== Best Special Effects ===
- Peter Hjort, Hummer Højmark & Lars K. Andersen – Adam's Apples

=== Best Sound Design ===
- Hans Møller – Nordkraft (film)

=== Best Editing ===
- Kasper Leick – Fluerne på væggen

=== Best Score ===
- Halfdan E. – Manslaughter

=== Best Song ===
- The Raveonettes – "Please you" – Nordkraft (film)

=== Non-American Film ===
- Downfall – Oliver Hirschbiegel

=== Best American Film ===
- Sideways – Alexander Payne

=== Best Documentary Short ===
- Kort film om tro – Nikolai Østergaard

=== Best Documentary Feature ===
- Ondskabens anatomi – Ove Nyholm

=== Best Short Fiction/Animation ===
- Lille Lise – Benjamin Holmsteen

== See also ==
- 2006 Bodil Awards
