= Robert Award for Best Children's Film =

Danish film award

The Robert Award for Best Children's Film (Danish: Robert Prisen for årets børne- og ungdomsfilm) is one of the merit awards presented by the Danish Film Academy at the annual Robert Awards ceremony. The award has been handed out since 2002.

== Honorees ==
=== 2000s ===
- 2002: Min søsters børn – Tomas Villum Jensen
- 2003: Klatretøsen – Hans Fabian Wullenweber
- 2004: Bagland – Anders Gustafsson
- 2005: Terkel in Trouble – Stefan Fjeldmark, Kresten Vestbjerg Andersen & Thorbjørn Christoffersen
- 2006: Strings – Anders Rønnow Klarlund
- 2007: Supervoksen – Christina Rosendahl
- 2008: Island of Lost Souls – Nikolaj Arcel
- 2009: Max Pinlig – Lotte Svendsen

=== 2010s ===
- 2010: SuperBrother – Birger Larsen
- 2011: Hold om mig – Kaspar Munk
- 2012: Rebounce – Heidi Maria Faisst
- 2013: You & Me Forever – Kaspar Munk
- 2014: Antboy – Ask Hasselbalch
- 2015: Antboy: Revenge of the Red Fury – Ask Hasselbalch
- 2016: The Shamer's Daughter – Kenneth Kainz
- 2017: In the Blood – Rasmus Heisterberg
- 2018: The Incredible Story of the Giant Pear – Jørgen Lerdam
- 2019: Checkered Ninja – Anders Matthesen

=== 2020s ===
- 2020: Gooseboy – Michael Wikke & Steen Rasmussen
- 2021: A Perfectly Normal Family – Malou Reymann
- 2022: Checkered Ninja 2 – Anders Matthesen and Thorbjørn Christoffersen
- 2023: Little Allan: The Human Antenna – Amalie Næsby Fick
