= Robert Award for Best Score =

Danish film award

The Robert Award for Best Score (Danish: Robert Prisen for årets score; previously called Robert Prisen for årets musik, Lit.:The Robert Award for music of the year) is one of the merit awards presented by the Danish Film Academy at the annual Robert Awards ceremony. The award has been handed out every year since 1984, except 1988.

== Honorees ==
=== 1980s ===
- 1984: Leif Sylvester Petersen for Rocking Silver
- 1985: Kim Larsen for In the Middle of the Night
- 1986: Kasper Winding - De flyvende djævle
- 1987: Anne Linnet for Early Spring
- 1988: Not awarded
- 1989: Jacob Groth for Guldregn

=== 1990s ===
- 1990: Thomas Koppel for Lykken er en underlig fisk
- 1991: Fini Høstrup for Springflod
- 1992: Joachim Holbek - Europa
- 1993: Joachim Holbek and Billy Cross for Russian Pizza Blues
- 1994: Anders Koppel and Hans-Henrik Ley - Jungledyret Hugo
- 1995: Joachim Holbek for Riget
- 1996: Anders Koppel for The Beast Within (1995 film)
- 1997: Nikolaj Egelund - The Biggest Heroes
- 1998: Nikolaj Egelund and Povl Kristian for Let's Get Lost
- 1999: Joakim Holbek for Heart of Light

=== 2000s ===
- 2000: Søren Hyldgaard and Jesper Winge Leisner for The One and Only
- 2001: Björk and Mark Bell for Dancer in the Dark
- 2002: Tim Stahl and John Guldberg (Laid Back) for Flyvende farmor
- 2003: Halfdan E for Okay
- 2004: Halfdan E for The Inheritance
- 2005: Bossy Bo - Terkel in Trouble
- 2006: Halfdan E for Manslaughter
- 2007: Jeppe Kaas and Mikael Simpson for Rene hjerter
- 2008: Karsten Fundal for The Art of Crying
- 2009: Jeppe Kaas for The Candidate

=== 2010s ===
- 2010: Tina Dickow for Oldboys
- 2011: Thomas Blachman and Kristian Eidnes Andersen for Submarino
- 2012: Sune Martin for Dirch
- 2013: Gabriel Yared and Cyrille Aufort for A Royal Affair
- 2014: Cliff Martinez for Only God Forgives
- 2015: Tina Dickow and Marie Fisker - En du elsker
