= Robert Award for Best Song =

Danish film award

The Robert Award for Best Song (Danish: Robert Prisen for årets sang) is one of the merit awards presented by the Danish Film Academy at the annual Robert Awards ceremony. The award has been handed out since 2002, bar 2014 and 2015.

== Honorees ==
=== 2000s ===
- 2002: Joachim Holbek for "Little White Doll" in Send mere slik
- 2003: Nikolaj Steen for "It's Okay" in Okay
- 2004: Carpark North for "Transparent & Glasslike" in Midsommer
- 2005: Anders Matthesen for "Paranoia" in Terkel in Trouble
- 2006: The Raveonettes for "Please You" in Nordkraft
- 2007: Poul Halberg, Steen Rasmussen, and Michael Wikke for "Jeg vil have en baby" in Der var engang en dreng
- 2008: Elisabeth Gjerluff Nielsen for "Lille svale" from Karlas kabale
- 2009: Kira Skov for "Riders of the Freeway" in Frygtelig lykkelig

=== 2010s ===
- 2010: Tina Dickow for "Rebel Song" in Oldboys
- 2011: Agnes Obel for "Riverside" in Submarino
- 2012: Jeppe Kaas for "Lille frøken Himmelblå" in Dirch
- 2013: Annika Aakjær, Halfdan E, and Søren Siegumfeldt for "Sangen om Gummi T – Hvem ved hvad der er op og ned" in Gummi T
- 2014: Not awarded
- 2015: Not awarded
- 2016: Pharfar, Andreas Keilgaard, and Wafande for "Der er kun en som Iqbal" in Iqbal & den hemmelige opskrift
- 2017: Anders Trentemøller, Ina Lindgreen, Josephine Philip and Darkness Falls for "100 meter mind dash" in Shelley
- 2018: Rumle Sieling Langdal for "I Don’t Know How to Get in Your Heart" in Mesteren
- 2019: KewanLiggerBeatetNormal and Anders Matthesen for «Skubber det sne» in Rutete Ninja

=== 2020s ===
- 2020: Kaya Wilkins and Mikkel Hess for «One last time» in Selvmordsturisten
