= 9th Robert Awards =

1992 Danish film awards ceremony

- Date: 1992
- Organized by: Danish Film Academy

Highlights
- Best Film: Europa
- Most awards: Europa (7)
- Most nominations: Europa (7)

The 9th Robert Awards ceremony was held in 1992 in Copenhagen, Denmark. Organized by the Danish Film Academy, the awards honoured the best in Danish and foreign film of 1991.

== Honorees ==
=== Best Danish Film ===
- Europa – Lars von Trier

=== Best Screenplay ===
- Marianne Goldman – Freud Leaving Home

=== Best Actor in a Leading Role ===
- Ole Lemmeke – De nøgne træer

=== Best Actress in a Leading Role ===
- Ghita Nørby – Freud Leaving Home

=== Best Actor in a Supporting Role ===
- Nikolaj Lie Kaas – The Boys from St. Petri

=== Best Actress in a Supporting Role ===
- Jessica Zanden – Freud Leaving Home

=== Best Cinematography ===
- Henning Bendtsen – Europa

=== Best Production Design ===
- Henning Bahs – Europa

=== Best Costume Design ===
- Manon Rasmussen – The Boys from St. Petri

=== Best Makeup ===
- Dennis Knudsen – The Boys from St. Petri

=== Best Sound Design ===
- Per Streit Jensen – Europa

=== Best Special Effects ===
- Hummer Højmark, Morten Jacobsen & Kaj Grönberg – Europa

=== Best Editing ===
- Hervé Schneid – Europa

=== Best Score ===
- Joachim Holbek – Europa

=== Best Short Featurette ===
- Lille dreng på Østerbro – Lasse Spang Olsen

=== Best Foreign Film ===
- Dances with Wolves – Kevin Costner

== See also ==
- 1992 Bodil Awards
