= 4th Robert Awards =

1987 Danish film awards ceremony

- Date: 1987
- Organized by: Danish Film Academy

Highlights
- Best Film: Flaming Hearts
- Most awards: Flaming Hearts (7)
- Most nominations: Flaming Hearts (7)

The 4th Robert Awards ceremony was held in 1987 in Copenhagen, Denmark. Organized by the Danish Film Academy, the awards honoured the best in Danish and foreign film of 1986.

== Honorees ==
=== Best Danish Film ===
- Coeurs flambés - Helle Ryslinge

=== Best Screenplay ===
- Helle Ryslinge - Coeurs flambés

=== Best Actor in a Leading Role ===
- Torben Jensen - Coeurs flambés

=== Best Actress in a Leading Role ===
- Kirsten Lehfeldt - Coeurs flambés

=== Best Actor in a Supporting Role ===
- Peter Hesse Overgaard - Coeurs flambés

=== Best Actress in a Supporting Role ===
- Sofie Gråbøl – The Wolf at the Door

=== Best Cinematography ===
- Morten Bruus & Tom Elling for The Dark Side of the Moon & Før gæsterne kommer

=== Best Production Design ===
- Leif Sylvester Petersen – The Dark Side of the Moon

=== Best Costume Design ===
- Manon Rasmussen – Barndommens gade

=== Best Makeup ===
- Erik Schiødt – Coeurs flambés

=== Best Special Effects ===
- Stig Sparre-Ulrich & Niels Arnt Torp – Barndommens gade

=== Best Editing ===
- Birger Møller Jensen – Coeurs flambés

=== Best Score ===
- Anne Linnet – Barndommens gade

=== Best Documentary Short ===
- Asian Heart – kone pr. postordre – Malene Ravn & Bodil Trier

=== Best Short Featurette ===
- Gæsterne kommer - Jon Bang Carlsen

=== Best Foreign Film ===
- My Life as a Dog – Lasse Hallström

== See also ==
- 1987 Bodil Awards
