= Robert Award for Best Production Design =

Danish film award

The Robert Award for Best Production Design (Danish: Robert Prisen for årets scenograf) is one of the merit awards presented by the Danish Film Academy at the annual Robert Awards ceremony. The award has been handed out since 1984, except in 1991.

== Honorees ==
=== 1980s ===
- 1984: Palle Nybo Arestrup for Thunderbirds
- 1985: Peter Høimark for The Element of Crime
- 1986: Henning Bahs for Johannes' hemmelighed
- 1987: Leif Sylvester Petersen for The Dark Side of the Moon
- 1988: Anna Asp for Pelle the Conqueror
- 1989: Palle Nybo Arestrup for Himmel og helvede

=== 1990s ===
- 1990: Henning Bahs for The Miracle in Valby
- 1991: Not awarded
- 1992: Henning Bahs for Europa
- 1993: Peter Høimark for Sofie
- 1994: Gunilla Allard for Black Harvest
- 1995: Palle Nybo Arestrup for Carl, My Childhood Symphony
- 1996: Viggo Bentzon for Kun en pige
- 1997: Karl Juliusson for Breaking the Waves
- 1998: Norbert Scherer for The Island on Bird Street
- 1999: Thomas Ravn for Skyggen

=== 2000s ===
- 2000: Karl Juliusson for The Magnetist's Fifth Winter
- 2001: Karl Juliusson for Dancer in the Dark
- 2002: Søren Skjær for Chop Chop
- 2003: Steffen Aarfing and Marie í Dali for I Am Dina
- 2004: Ben van Os and Jette Lehmann for It's All About Love
- 2005: Niels Sejer for King's Game
- 2006: Jette Lehmann for Nordkraft
- 2007: Peter De Neergaard for Der var en gang en dreng
- 2008: Niels Sejer for Island of Lost Souls
- 2009: Jette Lehmann for Flame & Citron

=== 2010s ===
- 2010: Søren Kragh Sørensen and Finn Richardt for Aching Hearts
- 2011: Torben Stig Nielsen for Submarino
- 2012: Jette Lehmann for Melancholia
- 2013: Niels Sejer for A Royal Affair
- 2014: Thomas Greve for Sex, Drugs & Taxation
- 2015: Sabine Hviid for When Animals Dream
- 2016: Mia Steensgaard for Mænd og høns
- 2017: Sabine Hviid for The Day Will Come
- 2018: Gustav Pontoppidan for Winter Brothers
- 2019: Jette Lehmann for A Fortunate Man

=== 2020s ===
- 2020: Josephine Farsø for Harpiks
- 2021: Rie Lykke for Vores mand i Amerika
- 2022: Søren Schwarzberg for Margrete: Queen of the North
- 2023: Lina Nordqvist for Holy Spider
- 2024: Jette Lehmann for The Promised Land
- 2025: Amalie Skovhus Petersen for Madame Ida
- 2026: Jagna Dobesz for The Girl with the Needle

== See also ==
- Henning Bahs Award - the production design award at the Bodil Awards
