= Robert Award for Best Editing =

Danish film award

The Robert Award for Best Editing (Danish: Robert Prisen for årets klipper) is one of the merit awards presented by the Danish Film Academy at the annual Robert Awards ceremony. The award has been handed out since 1984.

== Honorees ==
=== 1980s ===
- 1984: Janus Billeskov Jansen for Thunderbirds
- 1985: Tómas Gislason for The Element of Crime
- 1986: Kasper Schyberg for De flyvende djævle
- 1987: Birger Møller Jensen for Coeurs flambés
- 1988: Janus Billeskov Jansen for Pelle the Conqueror
- 1989: Leif Axel Kjeldsen for Emma's Shadow

=== 1990s ===
- 1990: Birger Møller Jensen for Århus by Night
- 1991: Leif Axel Kjeldsen for Springflod
- 1992: Hervé Schneid for Europa
- 1993: Birger Møller Jensen for Pain of Love
- 1994: Janus Billeskov Jansen for The House of the Spirits
- 1995: Camilla Skousen for Nightwatch
- 1996: Morten Giese for The Beast Within (1995 film)
- 1997: Anders Refn for Breaking the Waves
- 1998: Morten Giese, Jakob Thuesen and Per K. Kirkegaard for Eye of the Eagle and Credo
- 1999: Valdís Óskarsdóttir for Festen

=== 2000s ===
- 2000: Valdís Óskarsdóttir for Mifune's Last Song
- 2001: Molly Marlene Steensgaard and Francois Gedigier for Dancer in the Dark
- 2002: Søren B. Ebbe for Kira's Reason: A Love Story
- 2003: Pernille Bech Christiansen and Thomas Krag for Open Hearts
- 2004: Mikkel E. G. Nielsen and Peter Brandt for Reconstruction
- 2005: Mikkel E. G. Nielsen for King's Game
- 2006: Kasper Leick for Fluerne på væggen
- 2007: Åsa Mossberg for Prag
- 2008: Anders Villadsen for Just Another Love Story
- 2009: Anne Østerud for Worlds Apart

=== 2010s ===
- 2010: Anders Refn for Antichrist
- 2011: Adam Nielsen for R
- 2012: Molly Malene Stensgaard for Melancholia
- 2013: Adam Nielsen for A Hijacking
- 2014: Anne Østerud and Janus Billeskov Jansen for The Hunt
- 2015: Molly Malene Stensgaard and Morten Højbjerg for Nymphomaniac Director's Cut
- 2016: Molly Malene Stensgaard and Per Sandholt for Land of Mine
- 2017: Tanya Fallenius and Anne Østerud for Parents
- 2018: Kasper Leick for Darkland
