= Robert Award for Best Non-English Language Film =

Danish film award

The Robert Award for Best Non-English Language Film, previously named the Robert Award for Best Non-American Film until 2018, is an award presented by the Danish Film Academy at the annual Robert Awards ceremony. The award has been handed out since 1997. Between 1984 and 1996 a Robert Award for Best Foreign Film was handed out.

== History ==
In the first years of the Robert Awards, between 1984 and 1996, only a Robert Award for Best Foreign Film was awarded. Then the category was split into two awards: the Robert Award for Best Non-American Film (from 1997) and the Robert Award for Best American Film (from 1999). The names of these categories were changed in 2019 to the Robert Award for Best English Language Film and Robert Award for Best Non-English Language Film.

== Honorees ==
=== 1990s ===
- 1997: Il Postino: The Postman – Michael Radford
- 1998: The Full Monty – Peter Cattaneo
- 1999: My Name Is Joe – Ken Loach

=== 2000s ===
- 2000: All About My Mother by Pedro Almodóvar & Life Is Beautiful by Roberto Benigni
- 2001: Crouching Tiger, Hidden Dragon – Ang Lee
- 2002: Moulin Rouge! – Baz Luhrmann
- 2003: Amélie – Jean-Pierre Jeunet
- 2004: Good Bye, Lenin! – Wolfgang Becker
- 2005: Evil – Mikael Håfström
- 2006: Downfall – Oliver Hirschbiegel
- 2007: The Lives of Others – Florian Henckel von Donnersmarck
- 2008: Eastern Promises – David Cronenberg
- 2009: Everlasting Moments – Jan Troell

=== 2010s ===
- 2010: Slumdog Millionaire – Danny Boyle
- 2011: An Education – Lone Scherfig
- 2012: The King's Speech – Tom Hooper
- 2013: Amour – Michael Haneke
- 2014: Blue Is the Warmest Colour – Abdellatif Kechiche
- 2015: Force Majeure – Ruben Östlund
- 2016: Mommy – Xavier Dolan
- 2017: Son of Saul – László Nemes
- 2018: The Square – Ruben Östlund
- 2019: Border – Ali Abbasi

=== 2020s ===
- 2020: Parasite – Bong Joon-ho
- 2021: Portrait of a Lady on Fire – Céline Sciamma
- 2022: The Innocents – Eskil Vogt
- 2023: The Worst Person in the World – Joachim Trier
- 2024: Close – Lukas Dhont
- 2025: The Zone of Interest - Jonathan Glazer
- 2026: I'm Still Here - Walter Salles

== See also ==
- Bodil Award for Best Non-English Language Film
