= Robert Award for Best Documentary Feature =

Danish film award

The Robert Award for Best Documentary Feature (Danish: Robert Prisen for årets lange dokumentarfilm) is one of the merit awards presented by the Danish Film Academy at the annual Robert Awards ceremony. The award has been handed out since 2002.

== Honorees ==
=== 2000s ===
- 2002: Family by Sami Saif & Phie Ambo
- 2003: Angels of Brooklyn by Camilla Hjelm Knudsen & Martin Zandvliet
- 2004: Med ret til at dræbe by Morten Henriksen & Peter Øvig Knudsen
- 2005: The Swenkas by Jeppe Rønde
- 2006: Ondskabens anatomi by Ove Nyholm
- 2007: Menneskenes land by Anne Regitze Wivel
- 2008: Milosevic on Trial by Michael Christoffersen
- 2009: Burma VJ by Anders Høgsbro Østergaard

=== 2010s ===
- 2010: Fra Haifa til Nørrebro by Omar Shargawi
- 2011: Armadillo by Janus Metz Pedersen
- 2012: The Ambassador by Mads Brügger
- 2013: The Act of Killing by Joshua Oppenheimer
- 2014: Drømmen om en Familie by Mira Jargil
- 2015: The Look of Silence by Joshua Oppenheimer
- 2016: The Man Who Saved the World by Peter Anthony
- 2017: Dem vi var by Sine Skibsholt
- 2018: Last Men in Aleppo by Feras Fayyad
- 2019: Olegs krig by Simon Lereng Wilmont

=== 2020s ===
- 2020: The Cave by Feras Fayyad
- 2021: The Mole: Undercover in North Korea by Mads Brügger
- 2022: Flee by Jonas Poher Rasmussen
- 2023: A House Made of Splintersby Simon Lereng Wilmont
- 2024: Apolonia, Apolonia by Lea Glob
- 2025: The Son and the Moon by Emilie Adelina Monies and Roja Pakari
- 2026: Mr Nobody Against Putin by David Borenstein

== See also ==
- Robert Award for Best Documentary Short
- Bodil Award for Best Documentary
