= Robert Award for Best Documentary Short =

Danish film award

The Robert Award for Best Documentary Short (Danish: Robert Prisen for årets korte dokumentarfilm) is one of the merit awards presented by the Danish Film Academy at the annual Robert Awards ceremony. The award has been handed out since 1984.

== Honorees ==
=== 1980s ===
- 1984: Motivation – nærbilleder fra en ungdomsskole directed by Anne Wivel and Arne Bro
- 1985: Fugl Fønix directed by Jon Bang Carlsen
- 1986: De tavse piger directed by Anne Wivel and Arne Bro
- 1987: Asian Heart directed by Malene Ravn and Bodil Trier
- 1988: Ansigt til ansigt directed by Anne Wivel
- 1989: Lys directed by Jens Jørgen Thorsen

=== 1990s ===
- 1990: Med døden inde på livet directed by Dola Bonfils
- 1991: 1700 meter fra fremtiden directed by Ulla Boje Rasmussen
- 1992: Not awarded
- 1993: Hjerter i slør directed by Jesper W. Nielsen and Brev til Jonas directed by Susanne Bier
- 1994: En skæv start and To år med Randi directed by Anja Dalhoff
- 1995: Drengen der gik baglæns directed by Thomas Vinterberg
- 1996: Carl Th. Dreyer: My Metier directed by Torben Skjødt Jensen and Haiti. Uden titel directed by Jørgen Leth
- 1997: Per Kirkeby – Vinterbillede directed by Jesper Jargil
- 1998: Patriotene directed by Tómas Gislason
- 1999: Gaias børn directed by Bente Milton

=== 2000s ===
- 2000: Jeg er levende directed by Jørgen Leth
- 2001: Den højeste straf directed by Tómas Gislason
- 2002: Radiofolket directed by Dorte Høegh Brask
- 2003: Palle Nielsen – mig skal intet fattes directed by Jytte Rex
- 2004: Krig directed by Jens Loftager
- 2005: Biernes by directed by Laila Hodell and Bertel Torne
- 2006: Kort film om tro directed by Nikolai Østergaard
- 2007: Lyd på liv directed by Iben Haahr Andersen and Katia Forbert Petersen
- 2008: Verden i Danmark directed by Max Kestner
- 2009: Lille voksen directed by Anders Gustafsson and Patrik Book

=== 2010s ===
- 2010: Ønskebørn directed by Birgitte Stærmose
- 2011: Fini directed by Jacob Secher Schulsinger
- 2012: Den tid vi har directed by Mira Jargil
- 2013: Kongens Foged directed by Phie Ambo
- 2014: Tal R: The Virgin directed by Daniel Dencik
- 2015: Mig og min far – hvem fanden gider klappe? directed by Kathrine Ravn Kruse
- 2016: Home Sweet Home directed by Katrine Philp
- 2018: Weltschmerz directed by Jesper Dalgaard
- 2019: Vi lader billedet stå et øjeblik directed by Esther Wellejus

=== 2020s ===
- 2020: Amfi directed by Mathias Broe

== See also ==
- Robert Award for Best Documentary Feature
- Bodil Award for Best Documentary
