= Robert Award for Best Actor in a Supporting Role =

Danish film award

The Robert Award for Best Actor in a Supporting Role (Danish: Robert Prisen for årets mandlige birolle) is one of the merit awards presented by the Danish Film Academy at the annual Robert Awards ceremony. The award has been handed out since 1984.

== Honorees ==
=== 1980s ===
- 1984: Hans Christian Ægidius for Forræderne
- 1985: Bent Mejding for Twist and Shout
- 1986: Flemming Bamse Jørgensen for Ofelia kommer til byen
- 1987: Peter Hesse Overgaard for Flamberede hjerter
- 1988: Björn Granath for Pelle the Conqueror
- 1989: Erik Mørk for Himmel og helvede

=== 1990s ===
- 1990: Tom McEwan for Århus by Night
- 1991: Peter Schrøder for Springflod
- 1992: Nikolaj Lie Kaas for The Boys from St. Petri
- 1993: Jesper Christensen for Sofie
- 1994: Jesper Christensen for Den russiske sangerinde
- 1995: Kim Bodnia for Nightwatch
- 1996: Søren Pilmark for Menneskedyret
- 1997: Ulrich Thomsen for The Biggest Heroes
- 1998: Jesper Christensen for Barbara
- 1999: Thomas Bo Larsen for The Celebration

=== 2000s ===
- 2000: Jesper Asholt for Mifune
- 2001: Peter Gantzler for Italiensk for begyndere
- 2002: Troels Lyby for En kort en lang
- 2003: Nikolaj Lie Kaas for Elsker dig for evigt
- 2004: Peter Steen for The Inheritance
- 2005: Søren Pilmark for King's Game
- 2006: Thure Lindhardt for Nordkraft
- 2007: Bent Mejding for Drømmen
- 2008: Jesper Asholt for The Art of Crying
- 2009: Jens Jørn Spottag for To verdener

=== 2010s ===
- 2010: Henning Moritzen for Headhunter
- 2011: Peter Plaugborg for Submarino
- 2012: Lars Ranthe for Dirch
- 2013: Mikkel Boe Følsgaard for A Royal Affair
- 2014: Nicolas Bro for Spies & Glistrup
- 2015: Fares Fares for The Absent One
- 2016: Nicolas Bro for Mænd og Høns
- 2017: Lars Mikkelsen for Der kommer en dag
- 2018: Jakob Oftebro for Mesteren
- 2019: Fares Fares for The Purity of Vengeance

=== 2020s ===
- 2020: Magnus Krepper for Dronningen
- 2021: Lars Brygmann for Riders of Justice
- 2022: Jakob Oftebro for Margrete: Queen of the North
- 2023: Arash Ashtiani for Holy Spider
- 2024: Simon Bjenneberg for The Promised Land
- 2025: Nicolas Bro for Mr. Freeman
- 2026: Anders Mossling for My Eternal Summer

== See also ==
- Bodil Award for Best Actor in a Supporting Role
