= Robert Award for Best English Language Film =

Danish film award

- Description: Best English-language film at the Danish Robert Awards
- Country: Denmark
- Presented by: Danish Film Academy
- Website: www.robertprisen.dk

The Robert Award for Best English Language Film (previously named the Robert Award for Best American Film from 1999 to 2018) is an award presented by the Danish Film Academy at the annual Robert Awards ceremony.

== History ==
The award has been handed out since 1999. Between 1984 and 1996, a Robert Award for Best Foreign Film was awarded. Then was split into two awards: Robert Award for Best Non-American Film (from 1997) and the Robert Award for Best American Film (from 1999). The names of these categories were changed in 2019 to the Robert Award for Best English Language Film and Robert Award for Best Non-English Language Film.

== Honorees ==
=== 1990s ===
- 1999: The Truman Show – Peter Weir

=== 2000s ===
- 2000: The Straight Story – David Lynch
- 2001: American Beauty – Sam Mendes
- 2002: The Lord of the Rings: The Fellowship of the Ring – Peter Jackson
- 2003: Gosford Park – Robert Altman
- 2004: The Hours – Stephen Daldry
- 2005: Lost in Translation – Sofia Coppola
- 2006: Sideways – Alexander Payne
- 2007: Babel – Alejandro González Iñárritu
- 2008: Not awarded
- 2009: No Country for Old Men – Joel Coen and Ethan Coen

=== 2010s ===
- 2010: Up – Pete Docter
- 2011: Inception – Christopher Nolan
- 2012: Drive – Nicolas Winding Refn
- 2013: Argo – Ben Affleck
- 2014: Gravity – Alfonso Cuarón
- 2015: Boyhood – Richard Linklater
- 2016: Birdman – Alejandro G. Iñárritu
- 2017: The Revenant – Alejandro G. Iñárritu
- 2018: Manchester by the Sea – Kenneth Lonergan
- 2019: Three Billboards – Martin McDonagh

=== 2020s ===
- 2020: Joker – Todd Phillips
- 2021: 1917 - Sam Mendes
- 2022: Nomadland - Chloe Zhao
- 2023: Triangle of Sadness - Ruben Östlund
- 2024: Oppenheimer - Christopher Nolan

== Directors with multiple wins ==
- Alejandro G. Iñárritu - 3

== See also ==
- Bodil Award for Best American Film
- Academy Award for Best Picture
