= 28th Robert Awards =

2011 Danish film awards ceremony

- Date: 6 February 2011
- Organized by: Danish Film Academy

The 28th Robert Awards ceremony was held on 6 February 2011 in Copenhagen, Denmark. Organized by the Danish Film Academy, the awards honoured the best in Danish and foreign film of 2010.

== Honorees ==
=== Best Danish Film ===
- R

=== Best Children's Film ===
- Hold om mig - Kaspar Munk

=== Best Director ===
- Tobias Lindholm & Michael Noer – R

=== Best Screenplay ===
- Tobias Lindholm & Michael Noer – R

=== Best Actor in a Leading Role ===
- Pilou Asbæk – R

=== Best Actress in a Leading Role ===
- Trine Dyrholm – Hævnen

=== Best Actor in a Supporting Role ===
- Peter Plauborg – Submarino

=== Best Actress in a Supporting Role ===
- Bodil Jørgensen – Smukke mennesker

=== Best Production Design ===
- Torben Stig Nielsen – Submarino

=== Best Cinematography ===
- Magnus Nordenhof Jønck – R

=== Best Costume Design ===
- Margrethe Rasmussen – Submarino

=== Best Makeup ===
- Niamh Morrison – Valhalla Rising

=== Best Editing ===
- Adam Nielsen – R

=== Best Sound Design ===
- Morten Green – R

=== Best Score ===
- Thomas Blachman & Kristian Eidnes Andersen – Submarino

=== Best Song ===
- Agnes Obel – "Riverside" – Submarino

=== Best Special Effects ===
- Morten Jacobsen & Thomas Foldberg – R

=== Best Short Fiction/Animation ===
- To venner – Paw Charlie Ravn

=== Best Long Fiction/Animation ===
- Limboland – Jeremy Weller

=== Documentary Short ===
- Fini – Jacob Secher Schulsinger

=== Best Documentary Feature ===
- Armadillo – Janus Metz

=== Best American Film ===
- Inception – Christopher Nolan

=== Best Non-American Film ===
- An Education – Lone Scherfig

=== Audience Award ===
- Klown

== See also ==
- 2011 Bodil Awards
