= Robert Special Jury Prize (Short) =

Danish film award

The Robert Special Jury Prize (Short) (Danish: Kortfilmjuryens specialpris) is one of the special awards presented occasionally by the Danish Film Academy at the annual Robert Awards ceremony. The award was first handed out in 1995.

== Honorees ==
- 1995: Claus Loof (posthumously)
- 1998: Henning Bahs
- 2001: Ib Makwarth – Pigen fra Oradour
- 2005: Max Kestner – Nede på jorden
