= Robert Award for Best Actress in a Supporting Role =

Danish film award

The Robert Award for Best Actress in a Supporting Role (Danish: Robert Prisen for årets kvindelige birolle) is one of the merit awards presented by the Danish Film Academy at the annual Robert Awards ceremony. The award has been handed out since 1984.

== Honorees ==
=== 1980s ===
- 1984: Mette Munk Plum for Thunderbirds
- 1985: Aase Hansen for Twist and Shout
- 1986: Kirsten Olesen for Elise
- 1987: Sofie Gråbøl for The Wolf at the Door
- 1988: Lene Brøndum for Pelle the Conqueror
- 1989: Harriet Andersson for Himmel og helvede

=== 1990s ===
- 1990: Helle Ryslinge for Lykken er en underlig fisk
- 1991: Kirsten Olesen for Springflod
- 1992: Jessica Zandén for Freud Leaving Home
- 1993: Ghita Nørby for Sofie
- 1994: Anne Marie Helger for De frigjorte
- 1995: Rikke Louise Andersson for Nightwatch
- 1996: Birthe Neumann for Kun en pige
- 1997: Katrin Cartlidge for Breaking the Waves
- 1998: Ellen Hillingsø for Sekten
- 1999: Birthe Neumann for Festen

=== 2000s ===
- 2000: Sofie Gråbøl for Den eneste ene
- 2001: Ann Eleonora Jørgensen for Italiensk for begyndere
- 2002: Birthe Neumann for Fukssvansen
- 2003: Paprika Steen for Elsker dig for evigt
- 2004: Ghita Nørby for The Inheritance
- 2005: Trine Dyrholm for In Your Hands
- 2006: Charlotte Fich for Drabet
- 2007: Stine Fischer Christensen for Efter bryllupet
- 2008: Hanne Hedelund for The Art of Crying
- 2009: Sarah Boberg for To verdener

=== 2010s ===
- 2010: Pernille Vallentin for Deliver Us from Evil
- 2011: Bodil Jørgensen for Smukke mennesker
- 2012: Charlotte Gainsbourg for Melancholia
- 2013: Trine Dyrholm for En kongelig affære
- 2014: Susse Wold for The Hunt
- 2015: Danica Curcic for Silent Heart
- 2016: Trine Dyrholm for Lang historie kort
- 2017: Sofie Gråbøl for Der kommer en dag
- 2018: Victoria Carmen Sonne for Winter Brothers
- 2019: Jessica Dinnage for Den skyldige

=== 2020s ===
- 2020: Sofie Torp for Daniel
- 2021: Özlem Saglanmak for Shorta
- 2022: Josephine Park for Venuseffekten
- 2023: Lene Maria Christensen for Rose
- 2024: Jessica Dinnage for Unruly
- 2025: Stine Stengade for Matters of the Heart
- 2026: Trine Dyrholm for The Girl with the Needle

== See also ==
- Bodil Award for Best Actress in a Supporting Role
