= 3rd Robert Awards =

1986 Danish film awards ceremony

- Date: 1986
- Organized by: Danish Film Academy

Highlights
- Best Film: The Flying Devils
- Most awards: The Flying Devils (5)
- Most nominations: The Flying Devils (5)

The 3rd Robert Awards ceremony was held in 1986 in Copenhagen, Denmark. Organized by the Danish Film Academy, the awards honoured the best in Danish and foreign film of 1985.

== Honorees ==
=== Best Danish Film ===
- De flyvende djævle – Anders Refn

=== Best Screenplay ===
- Jon Bang Carlsen - Ofelia kommer til byen

=== Best Actor in a Leading Role ===
- Reine Brynolfsen – Ofelia kommer til byen

=== Best Actress in a Leading Role ===
- Stine Bierlich – Ofelia kommer til byen

=== Best Actor in a Supporting Role ===
- Flemming Jørgensen – Ofelia kommer til byen

=== Best Actress in a Supporting Role ===
- Kirsten Olesen – Elise

=== Best Cinematography ===
- Mikael Salomon – De flyvende djævle

=== Best Production Design ===
- Henning Bahs – Johannes' hemmelighed

=== Best Costume Design ===
- Evelyn Olsson & Jette Termann – Hodja fra Pjort

=== Best Special Effects ===
- Peter Høimark & Peter Klitgaard – Hodja fra Pjort

=== Best Editing ===
- Kasper Schyberg – De flyvende djævle

=== Best Sound Design ===
- Niels Arild Nielsen & Niels Bokkenheuser – De flyvende djævle

=== Best Score ===
- Kasper Winding - De flyvende djævle

=== Best Documentary Short ===
- De tavse piger - Anne Wivel & Arne Bro

=== Best Foreign Film ===
- False as Water – Hans Alfredson

== See also ==
- 1986 Bodil Awards
