= 16th Robert Awards =

1999 Danish film awards ceremony

- Date: 1999
- Organized by: Danish Film Academy

The 16th Robert Awards ceremony was held in 1999 in Copenhagen, Denmark. Organized by the Danish Film Academy, the awards honoured the best in Danish and foreign film of 1998.

== Honorees ==
=== Best Danish Film ===
- Festen – Thomas Vinterberg

=== Best Screenplay ===
- Thomas Vinterberg & Mogens Rukov – Festen

=== Best Actor in a Leading Role ===
- Ulrich Thomsen – Festen

=== Best Actress in a Leading Role ===
- Bodil Jørgensen – Idioterne

=== Best Actor in a Supporting Role ===
- Thomas Bo Larsen – Festen

=== Best Actress in a Supporting Role ===
- Birthe Neumann – Festen

=== Best Cinematography ===
- Anthony Dod Mantle – Festen

=== Best Production Design ===
- Thomas Ravn – Skyggen

=== Best Costume Design ===
- Ingrid Søe – Forbudt for børn

=== Best Makeup ===
- Jeanne Müller – Nattens engel

=== Best Special Effects ===
- Hans Peter Ludvigsen – Nattens engel

=== Best Sound Design ===
- Per Streit – Heart of Light

=== Best Editing ===
- Valdis Oskarsdottir – Festen

=== Best Score ===
- Joachim Holbek – Heart of Light

=== Best Documentary Short ===
- Gaias børn – Bente Milton

=== Best Short Featurette ===
- Kys, kærlighed og kroner – Louise Andreasen

=== Non-American Film ===
- My Name Is Joe – Ken Loach

=== Best American Film ===
- The Truman Show – Peter Weir

== See also ==
- 1999 Bodil Awards
