= 13th Robert Awards =

1996 Danish film awards ceremony

- Date: 1996
- Organized by: Danish Film Academy

Highlights
- Most awards: The Beast Within (1995 film) (8)

The 13th Robert Awards ceremony was held in 1996 in Copenhagen, Denmark. Organized by the Danish Film Academy, the awards honoured the best in Danish and foreign film of 1995.

== Honorees ==
=== Best Danish Film ===
- The Beast Within (1995 film) – Carsten Rudolph

=== Best Screenplay ===
- Carsten Rudolph – The Beast Within (1995 film)

=== Best Actor in a Leading Role ===
- Ulf Pilgaard – Farligt venskab

=== Best Actress in a Leading Role ===
- Puk Scharbau – Kun en pige

=== Best Actor in a Supporting Role ===
- Søren Pilmark – The Beast Within (1995 film)

=== Best Actress in a Supporting Role ===
- Birthe Neumann – Kun en pige

=== Best Cinematography ===
- Anthony Dod Mantle – The Beast Within (1995 film)

=== Production Design ===
- Viggo Bentzon – Kun en pige

=== Best Costume Design ===
- Manon Rasmussen – Kun en pige

=== Best Makeup ===
- Elisabeth Bukkehave – The Beast Within (1995 film)

=== Best Sound Design ===
- Hans Møller – The Beast Within (1995 film)

=== Best Editing ===
- Morten Giese – The Beast Within (1995 film)

=== Best Score ===
- Anders Koppel – The Beast Within (1995 film)

=== Best Documentary Short ===
- Carl Th. Dreyer: My Metier by Torben Skjødt Jensen & Haiti, Untitled by Jørgen Leth

=== Best Foreign Film ===
- Smoke – Wayne Wang

== See also ==
- 1996 Bodil Awards
