= 11th Robert Awards =

1994 Danish film awards ceremony

- Date: 1994
- Organized by: Danish Film Academy

The 11th Robert Awards ceremony was held in 1994 in Copenhagen, Denmark. Organized by the Danish Film Academy, the awards honoured the best in Danish and foreign film of 1993.

== Honorees ==
=== Best Danish Film ===
- The House of the Spirits – Bille August

=== Best Screenplay ===
- Bille August – The House of the Spirits

=== Best Actor in a Leading Role ===
- Frits Helmuth – Stolen Spring

=== Best Actress in a Leading Role ===
- Sofie Gråbøl – Black Harvest

=== Best Actor in a Supporting Role ===
- Jesper Christensen – Den russiske sangerinde

=== Best Actress in a Supporting Role ===
- Anne Marie Helger – De frigjorte

=== Best Cinematography ===
- Jan Weincke – Black Harvest

=== Production Design ===
- Gunilla Allard – Black Harvest

=== Best Costume Design ===
- Manon Rasmussen – Black Harvest

=== Best Makeup ===
- Dennis Knudsen & Anne Cathrine Sauerberg – Black Harvest

=== Best Sound Design ===
- Niels Arild – The House of the Spirits

=== Best Editing ===
- Janus Billeskov Jansen – The House of the Spirits

=== Best Score ===
- Anders Koppel & Hans-Henrik Ley – Jungledyret Hugo

=== Best Documentary Short ===
- En skæv start & To år med Randi – Anja Dalhoff

=== Best Foreign Film ===
- The Piano – Jane Campion

== See also ==
- 1994 Bodil Awards
