= 21st Robert Awards =

2004 Danish film awards ceremony

- Date: 2004
- Organized by: Danish Film Academy

The 21st Robert Awards ceremony was held in 2004 in Copenhagen, Denmark. Organized by the Danish Film Academy, the awards honoured the best in Danish and foreign film of 2003.

== Honorees ==
=== Best Danish Film ===
- The Inheritance – Per Fly

=== Best Children's Film ===
- Bagland – Anders Gustafsson

=== Best Director ===
- Per Fly – The Inheritance

=== Best Screenplay ===
- Lars von Trier – Dogville

=== Best Actor in a Leading Role ===
- Ulrich Thomsen – The Inheritance

=== Best Actress in a Leading Role ===
- Birthe Neumann – Lykkevej

=== Best Actor in a Supporting Role ===
- Peter Steen – The Inheritance

=== Best Actress in a Supporting Role ===
- Ghita Nørby – The Inheritance

=== Best Cinematography ===
- Anthony Dod Mantle – It's All About Love

=== Best Production Design ===
- Ben van Os & Jette Lehmann – It's All About Love

=== Best Costume Design ===
- Manon Rasmussen – Dogville

=== Best Makeup ===
- Charlotte Laustsen – The Green Butchers

=== Best Special Effects ===
- Peter Hjorth – It's All About Love

=== Best Sound Design ===
- Morten Green – Reconstruction

=== Best Editing ===
- Mikkel E. G. Nielsen & Peter Brandt – Reconstruction

=== Best Score ===
- Halfdan E. – The Inheritance

=== Best Song ===
- Carpark North – "Transparent & Glasslike" – Midsommer

=== Best Documentary Short ===
- Krig – Jens Loftager

=== Best Documentary Feature ===
- Med ret til at dræbe – Morten Henriksen & Peter Øvig Knudsen

=== Best Short Featurette ===
- Lille far – Michael W. Horsten

=== Best Long Featurette ===
- Dykkerdrengen – Morten Giese

=== Best Non-American Film ===
- Good Bye Lenin! – Wolfgang Becker

=== Best American Film ===
- The Hours – Stephen Daldry

=== Audience Award ===
- The Inheritance

=== FilmKopi prisen ===
- Super16 (film school)

== See also ==
- 2004 Bodil Awards
