= Katia Forbert Petersen =

Polish-Danish filmmaker (born 1949)

- Born: 6 February 1949 (age 77)
- Other name: Katia Forbert
- Occupations: Cinematographer, film director, producer, writer
- Years active: 1973 – Present
- Parent: Wladyslaw Forbert (father)

Katia Forbert Petersen (born 6 February 1949) is a Polish-Danish cinematographer, film director, producer, and writer, known for her work on the Danish-language films En fremmed piges dagbog (1989), Behind the Mountains (2004), and My Iranian Paradise (2008), among others.

Petersen has been involved in approximately 150 documentary and feature films over her career, and has done work for Zweites Deutsches Fernsehen in Germany and the National Film Board of Canada.

== Career ==
The daughter of Polish engineer and cinematographer Wladyslaw Forbert, Petersen spent her early career studying cinematography at the National Film School in Łódź, Poland. In response to the mounting anti-Semitic political crisis in Poland, Petersen emigrated to Denmark, where she held dual citizenship, after receiving her degree in 1969.

Petersen joined the Danish Film Institute in 1973. Soon after, she managed cinematography for three feminist feature films: the Danish film Take It Like a Man, Madam (1975), and two German films: The Power of Men is the Patience of Women (1978) and Redupers: The All-Round Reduced Personality (1978). Since then, she has filmed and directed numerous feature and documentary productions in Denmark and abroad.

Petersen is a frequent collaborator of fellow Danish women directors Annette Mari Olsen and Mette Knudsen. In 1988, Petersen and Olsen founded the production company Sfinx Film/TV, through which the duo continues to produce films together.

== Filmography ==
Year	Film			
Year	Film	Director	Cinematographer	Writer
1971	En husmor	No	Yes	No
1973	Polske piger	Yes	Yes	Yes
1975	Take It Like a Man, Madam	No	Yes	No
1976	Frihed er ikke noget man får, det er noget man tager	No	Yes	No
1976	Havets lavvandsfauna	Yes	Yes	Yes
1977	Christiania	No	Yes	No
1977	Kvinde og job	Yes	Yes	Yes
1978	The Power of Men is the Patience of Women	No	Yes	No
1978	Redupers: The All-Round Reduced Personality	No	Yes	No
1979	Anarchiets land	No	Yes	No
1979	Sammen med Lena	Yes	Yes	Yes
1979	Plantagens lange skygger - En film om Sylvia Woods	No	Yes	No
1979	Do We Start Off with a Dance?	No	No	Yes
1980	En uge uden smil	Yes	Yes	No
1980	Træerne og skovens folk	No	Yes	No
1981	Jeg blir' så bange	No	Yes	Yes
1981	En fugl under mit hjerte	No	Yes	No
1982	Teknik for dig og mig	Yes	Yes	
1982	Bjerg Eivind og hans hustru	No	Yes	No
1983	Hærvejen	No	Yes	No
1983	Syv billeder fra Hærvejen	No	Yes	No
1983	Veras historie - en film om modstandskamp	No	Yes	No
1984	Jeg vil ha' dig tilbage	Yes	Yes	Yes
1984	Midvinter, Masketid	No	Yes	No
1984	Betagelse Q-Q	No	Yes	No
1985	Johanne fra Daugbjerg	Yes	Yes	Yes
1985	Højt på en gren	No	Yes	No
1985	Rødstrømper - en kavalkade af kvindefilm	No	Yes	No
1986	Din daglige dosis	No	Yes	No
1986	Jobtilbud i nazismens Tyskland	No	Yes	No
1987	Mit søde barn	Yes	Yes	Yes
1987	Holografi	No	Yes	No
1987	En hård dags nat	No	Yes	No
1988	Indvandrerkvinder 3 - Kvinde i eksil	Yes		Yes
1988	Jako	Yes		Yes
1988	Musen og dansepigen	No	Yes	No
1989	En fremmed piges dagbog	Yes	Yes	Yes
1989	The Old Folk's Dance	No	Yes	No
1990	A Wanted Child	Yes	Yes	Yes
1990	A Pig after My Own Heart	Yes	Yes	Yes
1990	Stemmeret, Liberty, Equality and the Right to Vote	No	Yes	No
1991	Klar besked - en film om prævention	No	Yes	No
1991	Gud ånder på øjet, når det græder	No	Yes	No
1991	Madsen's Hotel	Yes		
1992	Gud gav hende en Mercedes-Benz	Yes		Yes
1992	You Have to be Round to Live in a Globe	Yes		
1993	Dreams & Dreams	No	Yes	No
1993	Lasse Lasse lille	No	Yes	No
1994	Like Birds in a Cage	No	Yes	No
1995	Man with Camera	Yes	Yes	Yes
1996	Two Women on a River	Yes	Yes	
1996	War is Not a Children's Game	No	Yes	No
1996	Go West	No	Yes	No
1997	Mit sprog som menneske	No	Yes	No
1997	They Don't Burn Priests, Do They?	No	Yes	No
1998	Cecilie's World	No	Yes	No
1999	Filmhits for børn 4 (Sut slut finale)	No	Yes	No
1999	The Time Before the Moment	Yes	Yes	Yes
2000	Von Trier's 100 Eyes	Yes	Yes	Yes
2000	Free as a Bird	No	Yes	No
2001	Min egen motorhest	Yes	Yes	No
2001	Konfirmanderne / Gud hvor er det svært	No	Yes	No
2001	The Countess and Her Daughters	No	Yes	No
2002	When Mum and Dad are Clowns	Editor		
2003	Det ulogiske instrument	Producer		
2003	Avation	Producer		
2003	It's All Good	Producer		
2003	5 hjerteslag	Producer		
2004	Behind the Mountains	Yes	Yes	Yes
2004	Homulus spectaculus	No	Yes	No
2006	Sound on Life	Yes	Yes	Yes
2007	The Bird That Could Tell Fortunes	Yes	Yes	
2008	My Iranian Paradise	Yes	Yes	Yes
2008	Tomme rum	No	Yes	No
2014	Mission Rape - A Tool of War	Yes	Yes	Yes

== Awards ==
- Bronze Medal, New York Television Festival, 1990 for A Wanted Child
- Gold Medal, Prix National, Festival de la Commission des Communauts Europennes, 1990 for A Pig after My Own Heart
- Special Commendation Non-fiction, Television Programme of the Year, Prix Europa, 1991 for Madsen's Hotel
- Special Commendation for Serials and Documentary Miniseries, Prix Europa, 1992 for You Have to be Round to Live in a Globe
- Danish Association of Cinematographers Annual Award, 1992
- Best Director, European Youth Film Festival, Antwerp, 1997
- Grand Prix, ITVA-Festival, Copenhagen, 1997 for Two Women on a River
- Special Prize for Best Television Documentary, Prix Europa, 1997 for They Don't Burn Priests, Do They?
- Special Commendation, Prix Niki, 1997 for They Don't Burn Priests, Do They?
- 2nd Prize, Nordic Glory Festival, Finland, 1997 for They Don't Burn Priests, Do They?
- Best Documentary and Best Photography, ITVA-Festival, New Orleans, 1998 for Two Women on a River
- Aller Press Prize, 1999 for The Time Before the Moment
- Women's International Film and Television Showcase - Honorary Golden Mermaid, 2001
- Jury Prize, Taiwan International Children's Film Festival, 2004 for When Mum and Dad are Clowns
- Jury Prize, Taiwan International Children's Film Festival, 2006 for Behind the Mountains
- Robert Award for Best Documentary Short, 2007 for Sound on Life
- Nominated for the Oxfam Global Justice Award, 2014 for Mission Rape - A Tool of War
- Nominated for Best European TV Programme of the Year, Prix Europa Iris, 2014 for Mission Rape - A Tool of War

== See also ==
- Cinema of Denmark
- Danish Film Institute
- Women's cinema
