= 17th Robert Awards =

2000 Danish film awards ceremony

- Date: 2000
- Organized by: Danish Film Academy

Highlights
- Most awards: Den eneste ene (6)

The 17th Robert Awards ceremony was held in 2000 in Copenhagen, Denmark. Organized by the Danish Film Academy, the awards honoured the best in Danish and foreign film of 1999.

== Honorees ==
=== Best Danish Film ===
- Den eneste ene – Susanne Bier

=== Best Screenplay ===
- Kim Fupz Aakeson – Den eneste ene

=== Best Actor in a Leading Role ===
- Niels Olsen – Den eneste ene

=== Best Actress in a Leading Role ===
- Sidse Babett Knudsen – Den eneste ene

=== Best Actor in a Supporting Role ===
- Jesper Asholt – Mifunes sidste sang

=== Best Actress in a Supporting Role ===
- Sofie Gråbøl – Den eneste ene

=== Best Cinematography ===
- Dirk Brüel – The Magnetist's Fifth Winter

=== Best Production Design ===
- Karl Juliusson – The Magnetist's Fifth Winter

=== Best Costume Design ===
- Katja Watkins – The Magnetist's Fifth Winter

=== Best Makeup ===
- John Janne Kindahl – The Magnetist's Fifth Winter

=== Best Special Effects ===
- Hummer Højmark – I Kina spiser de hunde

=== Best Sound Design ===
- Niels Arild – The Magnetist's Fifth Winter

=== Robert Award for Best Light ===
- Jacob Marlow & Emil Sparre-Ulrich – Bleeder

=== Best Editing ===
- Valdis Oskarsdottir – Mifunes sidste sang

=== Best Score ===
- Søren Hyldgaard & Jesper Winge Leisner – Den eneste ene

=== Best Documentary Short ===
- Jeg er levende – Jørgen Leth

=== Best Short Featurette ===
- Solen er så rød – Jens Arentzen

=== Non-American Film ===
- All About My Mother by Pedro Almodóvar & Life Is Beautiful by Roberto Benigni

=== Best American Film ===
- The Straight Story – David Lynch

== See also ==
- 2000 Bodil Awards
