= 18th Robert Awards =

2000 Danish film awards ceremony

- Date: 4 February 2001
- Organized by: Danish Film Academy

Highlights
- Best Film: Bænken
- Most awards: Dancer in the Dark (5)
- Most nominations: Dancer in the Dark (11)

The 18th Robert Awards ceremony was held on 4 February 2001 in Copenhagen, Denmark. Organized by the Danish Film Academy, the awards honoured the best in Danish and foreign film of 2000.

== Honorees ==
=== Best Danish Film ===
- Bænken – Per Fly

=== Best Director ===
- Per Fly – Bænken

=== Best Screenplay ===
- Lone Scherfig – Italiensk for begyndere

=== Best Actor in a Leading Role ===
- Jesper Christensen – Bænken

=== Best Actress in a Leading Role ===
- Björk – Dancer in the Dark

=== Best Actor in a Supporting Role ===
- Peter Gantzler – Italiensk for begyndere

=== Best Actress in a Supporting Role ===
- Ann Eleonora Jørgensen – Italiensk for begyndere

=== Best Cinematography ===
- Eric Kress – Flickering Lights

=== Production Design ===
- Karl Juliusson – Dancer in the Dark

=== Best Costume Design ===
- Louize Nissen – Bænken

=== Best Makeup ===
- Charlotte Laustsen – Bænken

=== Best Special Effects ===
- Thomas Borch Nielsen – Dykkerne

=== Best Sound Design ===
- Per Streit – Dancer in the Dark

=== Best Editing ===
- Molly Marlene Steensgaard & Francois Gedigier – Dancer in the Dark

=== Best Score ===
- Björk & Mark Bell – Dancer in the Dark

=== Best Documentary Short ===
- Den højeste straf – Tómas Gislason

=== Best Short Featurette ===
- 2. juledag – Carsten Myllerup

=== Best Non-American Film ===
- Crouching Tiger, Hidden Dragon – Ang Lee

=== Best American Film ===
- American Beauty – Sam Mendes

=== Audience Award ===
- Flickering Lights

=== Special Jury Prize (Short) ===
- Pigen fra Oradour – Ib Makwarth

== See also ==
- 2001 Bodil Awards
