= 25th Robert Awards =

2008 Danish film awards ceremony

- Date: 2008
- Organized by: Danish Film Academy

The 25th Robert Awards ceremony was held in 2008 in Copenhagen, Denmark. Organized by the Danish Film Academy, the awards honoured the best in Danish and foreign film of 2007.

== Honorees ==
=== Best Danish Film ===
- The Art of Crying – Peter Schønau Fog

=== Best Children's Film ===
- Island of Lost Souls – Nikolaj Arcel

=== Best Director ===
- Peter Schønau Fog – The Art of Crying

=== Best Screenplay ===
- Bo Hr Hansen - The Art of Crying

=== Best Actor in a Leading Role ===
- Lars Brygmann – Hvid nat

=== Best Actress in a Leading Role ===
- Noomi Rapace – Daisy Diamond

=== Best Actor in a Supporting Role ===
- Jesper Asholt – The Art of Crying

=== Best Actress in a Supporting Role ===
- Hanne Hedelund – The Art of Crying

=== Best Cinematography ===
- Dan Laustsen – Just Another Love Story

=== Best Production Design ===
- Niels Sejer – Island of Lost Souls

=== Best Costume Design ===
- Margrethe Rasmussen – The Art of Crying

=== Best Makeup ===
- Kamilla Bjerglind – Island of Lost Souls

=== Best Special Effects ===
- Hummer Højmark & Jeppe Nygaard Christensen – Island of Lost Souls

=== Best Sound Design ===
- Hans Christian Kock & Claus Lynge – Island of Lost Souls

=== Best Editing ===
- Anders Villadsen – Just Another Love Story

=== Best Score ===
- Karsten Fundal – The Art of Crying

=== Best Song ===
- Elisabeth Gjerluff Nielsen - "Lille svale" – Karlas kabale

=== Best Short Fiction/Animation ===
- Boy Meets Girl – Søren Frellesen

=== Best Long Fiction/Animation ===
- Ung mand falder – Martin de Thurah

=== Best Documentary Short ===
- Verden i Danmark – Max Kestner

=== Best Documentary Feature ===
- Slobodan Milosevic – Præsident under anklage – Michael Christoffersen

== See also ==
- 2008 Bodil Awards
