= 7th Robert Awards =

1990 Danish film awards ceremony

- Date: 1990
- Organized by: Danish Film Academy

Highlights
- Best Film: Waltzing Regitze
- Most awards: The Miracle in Valby and Waltzing Regitze (4)
- Most nominations: The Miracle in Valby and Waltzing Regitze (4)

The 7th Robert Awards ceremony was held in 1990 in Copenhagen, Denmark. Organized by the Danish Film Academy, the awards honoured the best in Danish and foreign film of 1989.

== Honorees ==
=== Best Danish Film ===
- Waltzing Regitze – Kaspar Rostrup

=== Best Screenplay ===
- Åke Sandgren & Stig Larsson – The Miracle in Valby

=== Best Actor in a Leading Role ===
- Frits Helmuth – Waltzing Regitze

=== Best Actress in a Leading Role ===
- Ghita Nørby – Waltzing Regitze

=== Best Actor in a Supporting Role ===
- Tom McEwan – Århus by Night

=== Best Actress in a Supporting Role ===
- Helle Ryslinge - Lykken er en underlig fisk

=== Best Cinematography ===
- Dan Laustsen – The Miracle in Valby

=== Best Production Design ===
- Henning Bahs – The Miracle in Valby

=== Best Costume Design ===
- Manon Rasmussen – The Miracle in Valby

=== Best Makeup ===
- Birthe Lyngsøe & Lene Ravn Henriksen – Waltzing Regitze

=== Best Sound Design ===
- Niels Arild Nielsen – Århus by Night

=== Best Editing ===
- Birger Møller Jensen – Århus by Night

=== Best Score ===
- Thomas Koppel – Lykken er en underlig fisk

=== Best Documentary Short ===
- Med døden inde på livet – Dola Bonfils

=== Best Foreign Film ===
- A Short Film About Killing – Krzysztof Kieślowski

== See also ==
- 1990 Bodil Awards
