= 6th Robert Awards =

1989 Danish film awards ceremony

- Date: 1989
- Organized by: Danish Film Academy

Highlights
- Best Film: Emma's Shadow
- Most awards: Emma's Shadow and Heaven and Hell (5)
- Most nominations: Emma's Shadow and Heaven and Hell (5)

The 6th Robert Awards ceremony was held in 1989 in Copenhagen, Denmark. Organized by the Danish Film Academy, the awards honoured the best in Danish and foreign film of 1988.

== Honorees ==
=== Best Danish Film ===
- Emma's Shadow – Søren Kragh-Jacobsen

=== Best Screenplay ===
- Søren Kragh-Jacobsen – Emma's Shadow

=== Best Actor in a Leading Role ===
- Börje Ahlstedt – Emma's Shadow

=== Best Actress in a Leading Role ===
- Karina Skands - Himmel og helvede

=== Best Actor in a Supporting Role ===
- Erik Mørk – Himmel og helvede

=== Best Actress in a Supporting Role ===
- Harriet Andersson – Himmel og helvede

=== Best Cinematography ===
- Dan Laustsen – Emma's Shadow

=== Best Production Design ===
- Palle Nybo Arestrup – Himmel og helvede

=== Best Costume Design ===
- Annelise Hauberg – Katinka

=== Best Sound Design ===
- Niels Arild Nielsen – Himmel og helvede

=== Best Editing ===
- Leif Axel Kjeldsen – Emma's Shadow

=== Best Score ===
- Jacob Groth – Guldregn

=== Best Documentary Short ===
- Lys – Jens Jørgen Thorsen

=== Best Short Featurette ===
- Nanna og Pernille – Eddie Thomas Petersen

== See also ==
- 1989 Bodil Awards
