= 14th Robert Awards =

1997 Danish film awards ceremony

- Date: 1997
- Organized by: Danish Film Academy

Highlights
- Best Film: Breaking the Waves
- Most awards: Breaking the Waves (9)
- Most nominations: Breaking the Waves (9)

The 14th Robert Awards ceremony was held in 1997 in Copenhagen, Denmark. Organized by the Danish Film Academy, the awards honoured the best in Danish and foreign film of 1996.

== Honorees ==
=== Best Danish Film ===
- Breaking the Waves – Lars von Trier

=== Best Screenplay ===
- Lars von Trier – Breaking the Waves

=== Best Actor in a Leading Role ===
- Thomas Bo Larsen – The Biggest Heroes

=== Best Actress in a Leading Role ===
- Emily Watson – Breaking the Waves

=== Best Actor in a Supporting Role ===
- Ulrich Thomsen – The Biggest Heroes

=== Best Actress in a Supporting Role ===
- Katrin Cartlidge – Breaking the Waves

=== Best Cinematography ===
- Robby Müller – Breaking the Waves

=== Best Production Design ===
- Karl Juliusson – Breaking the Waves

=== Best Costume Design ===
- Lotte Dandanell – Hamsun

=== Best Makeup ===
- Jennifer Jorfaid & Sanne Gravfort – Breaking the Waves

=== Best Sound Design ===
- Per Streit – Breaking the Waves

=== Best Editing ===
- Anders Refn – Breaking the Waves

=== Best Score ===
- Nikolaj Egelund – The Biggest Heroes

=== Best Documentary Short ===
- Per Kirkeby – Vinterbillede – Jesper Jargil

=== Best Short Featurette ===
- Blomsterfangen – Jens Arentzen

=== Non-American Film ===
- Il Postino: The Postman – Michael Radford

== See also ==
- 1997 Bodil Awards
