= The House of the Spirits (film) =

1993 drama film directed by Bille August

- Theatrical release poster
- Directed by: Bille August
- Written by: Bille August
- Based on: The House of the Spirits by Isabel Allende
- Produced by: Bernd Eichinger
- Starring: Meryl Streep; Jeremy Irons; Glenn Close; Winona Ryder; Antonio Banderas; Armin Mueller-Stahl; María Conchita Alonso; Vanessa Redgrave
- Cinematography: Jörgen Persson
- Edited by: Janus Billeskov Jansen
- Music by: Hans Zimmer
- Production company: Neue Constantin Film
- Distributed by: Neue Constantin Film (Germany); Warner Bros. (Denmark; through Sandrew Metronome)
- Release date: 17 October 1993 (Germany)
- Running time: 146 minutes
- Countries: Germany; Denmark; Portugal
- Language: English
- Budget: $40 million
- Box office: $61 million

The House of the Spirits (Danish: Åndernes hus) is a 1993 historical drama film written and directed by Bille August and starring Jeremy Irons, Meryl Streep, Glenn Close, Winona Ryder, Antonio Banderas and Vanessa Redgrave. The supporting cast includes María Conchita Alonso, Armin Mueller-Stahl, and Jan Niklas. Based on the 1982 novel by Isabel Allende, the film follows three generations of women from a Chilean family during the country’s military dictatorship.

Although the film won several awards in Europe, including Best Film at the Lola Awards from the German Film Academy and the Robert Award from the Danish Film Academy, in America it was regarded as a critical and commercial failure.

== Plot ==
The story is narrated by Blanca Trueba, a young woman from a powerful Chilean family.

=== 1926 ===
Blanca's mother, Clara del Valle is a child from a well-off family in Santiago whose father is running for the Senate. Clara possesses clairvoyant abilities and foresees her own marriage to Esteban Trueba, a miner, engaged to her sister at that time.

After her sister’s death by accidental poisoning, which Clara foresaw, Esteban uses the gold he found from mining to buy a hacienda, Tres Marías. He employs natives to work as peasants on the dilapidated land, eventually turning Tres Marías into a successful estate through his use of brute force.

One day while horseback riding through the countryside, he sees a peasant girl, Pancha García. Esteban rapes Pancha, resulting in the illegitimate birth of a boy. He also spends nights with Tránsito, a local prostitute to whom he lends money so she can start a new career in the capital.

=== 1946 ===
Twenty years later, Esteban’s sister Férula informs him that their ailing mother has died. At his mother’s funeral, Esteban sees a grown Clara and reacquaints himself with her. The couple marry, and Clara and Férula become especially close, with Clara allowing Férula to come live with her and her new husband at Tres Marías.

Clara eventually gives birth to a girl, naming her Blanca. One day, Pancha García appears at the family estate with her now teenaged son, Esteban García, asking his father for money. Esteban Trueba gives them some money but harshly turns them away. Esteban’s rejection leads his son Esteban, to nurse a resentment against his father and Blanca.

Meanwhile, Blanca befriends one of the peasant children, Pedro Tercero, the young son of Esteban's foreman Segundo. Esteban disapproves of his daughter playing with a peasant boy and sends her to a boarding school.

=== 1962 ===
After graduating from boarding school, Blanca returns to Tres Marías and reunites with Pedro, meeting him by the river every night. Férula continues to live with the family and has become a rival to her brother for Clara’s affections. Esteban throws Férula out of the house when he catches her and Clara asleep in the same bed. Before leaving, Férula curses Esteban to eternal loneliness.

Esteban catches Pedro preaching revolutionary ideas that are critical of wealthy landowners like him to the peasant workers. He punishes Pedro with a whipping and banishment from Tres Marías. That night at dinner, Clara and Blanca see a vision of Férula while having dinner. Férula kisses Clara on the forehead before calmly walking out. Realizing Férula has died, Clara drives into town to find Férula dead in her modest home. In a moment alone with Férula, Clara tells her how much she and Blanca miss her, and how proud she would be of Blanca.

Blanca continues to meet Pedro in secret. Jean de Satigny, a French nobleman who aspires to go into business with Esteban, sees Blanca and Pedro in a tryst at the river and rats her out to her father. Esteban punishes Blanca by whipping her and vows to go after Pedro. He strikes Clara when she points out his hypocrisy—having himself slept with women not of his own class—after which Clara vows never to speak to him again. She leaves Tres Marías with Blanca to live in Santiago.

Esteban offers a monetary reward for anyone who can reveal Pedro's whereabouts to him. Esteban García, unrecognized by his father, aids in helping to find Pedro. Pedro is able to escape from Esteban, who declines to give a reward to his son. Esteban later learns Blanca is pregnant with Pedro's child, and he goes to her house to falsely tell her that he murdered Pedro. Clara makes Esteban leave and reassures Blanca that Pedro is indeed alive, but they won't be reunited for some time because he needs to flee to safety. Years later, Esteban goes to Clara and apologizes for his actions. Though she maintains some distance from him, she does allow him to meet their seven-year-old granddaughter Alba and to be a part of her and Blanca’s lives again.

=== 1973 ===
Esteban is now a senator in the Conservative Party, while Pedro is a leader with the People's Front. Despite Esteban’s success, he is lonely and finds comfort in the arms of Tránsito, who now runs a high-class prostitution establishment. Esteban believes his party will win the election as usual, but the People’s Front ends up gaining control of the government. Clara passes away after gently explaining to Alba that she has always been in touch with spirits on the other side and will be in contact with the rest of the family.

A conspiracy between Conservative Party members and the military leads to a coup d'état, 11 de Septiembre, and the military seizes control of the country. Under military control, people associated with the People's Front are captured and even killed. The police come and arrest Blanca for her association with Pedro Tercero. Before Blanca is taken away, she tells Esteban that Pedro is the love of her life, just as Clara was his. She appeals to Esteban to use his political influence to help find asylum for Pedro outside Chile so the three of them can be a family. In the coming days, Blanca is tortured and sexually abused by her half-brother, Esteban García, who had joined the military with his father's help.

Esteban decides to honor his daughter's wishes and helps to find exile for Pedro in Canada. He also turns to Tránsito, who as an influential madam has connections to high-level military figures, to help free Blanca. One morning, a beaten Blanca finally arrives back at her home. A grateful Esteban tells her that Pedro is waiting for her and Alba in Canada, and hopes his help can make up for the damage his actions brought on his family.

=== Epilogue ===
Blanca and the elderly Esteban return to Tres Marías with Alba. Esteban is finally visited by Clara's spirit, who has come to help the old man on to the next world. Blanca sits outside and ponders her life, looking forward to a future with Pedro and their daughter. She reflects on how she does not want to live her life with anger or hatred—instead, she wishes to move forward and be happy.

== Cast ==
- Meryl Streep as Clara del Valle Trueba
  - Grace Gummer as young Clara
- Glenn Close as Férula Trueba
- Jeremy Irons as Esteban Trueba
- Winona Ryder as Blanca Trueba
  - Hannah Taylor-Gordon as young Blanca
- Antonio Banderas as Pedro Tercero
  - Josh Maguire as young Pedro
- Vanessa Redgrave as Nívea del Valle
- Armin Mueller-Stahl as Severo del Valle
- Maria Conchita Alonso as Tránsito
- Sarita Choudhury as Pancha García
- Jan Niklas as Count Jean de Satigny
- Vincent Gallo as Esteban García
- Teri Polo as Rosa del Valle
- Joaquín Martínez as Segundo
- Miriam Colon as Nana
- Sasha Hanau as Alba

== Production ==
=== Development ===
Author Isabel Allende received numerous offers from producers and agents to adapt her novel The House of the Spirits upon publication in 1982, but did not agree to option the work until Danish filmmaker Bille August convinced her with his vision for the film. In January 1993, Miramax acquired North American distribution rights for the film.

=== Casting ===
Controversy occurred over the casting of predominantly white English-speaking actors in a Latin American period film. Producer Bernd Eichinger defended the decision on the basis that the film needed internationally recognized actors. The film’s premiere in the U.S. was met with protests from Latino actors over the casting issue.

=== Filming ===
Principal photography took place in Denmark, with some scenes filmed in Lisbon, in the Monte das Três Marias located in Cercal do Alentejo and in Vila Nova de Milfontes, Portugal, from January 1993 to April.

== Release ==
The film premiered in Germany in October 1993 as a 145-minute theatrical cut that was also released in Switzerland, The Netherlands, and Scandinavia. The film was released in the United States on April 1, 1994 in a 132-minute cut version.

== Reception ==
The film has a 31% rating on Rotten Tomatoes based on 39 reviews. The website’s consensus states: "An enviable collection of sterling actors are all woefully miscast in The House of the Spirits, a plodding saga of magical realism that lacks much magic or realism." Two oft-cited reasons for the poor critical reception were its diffusely episodic structure and the casting of mostly Anglo actors in Latin American roles.

The film grossed $4.8 million in its first two weeks of release in Germany and went on to gross more than $55 million in Europe. In the United States and Canada, it grossed $6 million.

Angle Errigo of Empire gave The House of the Spirits two out of five stars and stated that: "If this had been a Latin American production, one might have been more generous towards the fumblings of a fairly fetching saga; given the talents involved, the film's hesitations in style and consistent failure to really move must be counted as a major disappointment."

=== Awards and nominations ===
The film won multiple awards: Bavarian Film Awards, German Film Awards, the Golden Screen (Germany), Havana Film Festival, and Robert Awards (Denmark), the German Phono Academy, and the Guild of German Art House Cinemas.

- 1994 Bavarian Film Award for Best Costume Design (Barbara Baum) Won
- 1994 Bavarian Film Award for Best Production (Bernd Eichinger) Won
- 1994 German Film Award in Gold for Outstanding Individual Achievement: Over All Concept (Bernd Eichinger) Won
- 1994 German Phono Academy Echo Award for Film Music of the Year (Hans Zimmer) Won
- 1994 Guild of German Art House Cinemas Award (Gold) for German Film (Bille August) Won
- 1994 Havana Film Festival Coral Award for Best Work of a Non-Latin American Director on a Latin America Subject (Bille August) Won
- 1994 Robert Award for Best Editing (Janus Billeskov Jansen) Won
- 1994 Robert Award for Best Film (Bille August) Won
- 1994 Robert Award for Best Screenplay (Bille August) Won
- 1994 Robert Award for Best Sound (Niels Arild) Won

=== Year-end worst-of lists ===
- 1st – Glenn Lovell, San Jose Mercury News
- 1st – Michael Mills, The Palm Beach Post
- 4th – Peter Travers, Rolling Stone
- Top 10 (listed alphabetically, not ranked) – Mike Mayo, The Roanoke Times
- Top 12 (listed alphabetically, not ranked) – David Elliott, The San Diego Union-Tribune
- #8 Worst - Michael Medved, Sneak Previews

== Soundtrack ==
The music for the film was composed by award winner Hans Zimmer. Additionally, two songs appear in the film: "La Paloma", a Spanish–Cuban–Mexican tune sung by popular Chilean singer Rosita Serrano; and "La Cumparsita", a classic Uruguayan tango tune performed by German bandleader Adalbert Lutter and his orchestra.
