= 5th Robert Awards =

1988 Danish film awards ceremony

- Date: 1988
- Organized by: Danish Film Academy

Highlights
- Best Film: Pelle the Conqueror
- Most awards: Pelle the Conqueror (9)
- Most nominations: Pelle the Conqueror (9)

The 5th Robert Awards ceremony was held in 1988 in Copenhagen, Denmark. Organized by the Danish Film Academy, the awards honoured the best in Danish and foreign film of 1987.

== Honorees ==
Best Danish Film
Pelle the Conqueror – Bille August
Best Screenplay
Bille August – Pelle the Conqueror
Best Actor in a Leading Role
Max von Sydow – Pelle the Conqueror
Best Actress in a Leading Role
Stéphane Audran – Babettes gæstebud
Best Actor in a Supporting Role
Björn Granath – Pelle the Conqueror
Best Actress in a Supporting Role
Lene Brøndum – Pelle the Conqueror
Best Cinematography
Jörgen Persson – Pelle the Conqueror
Best Production Design
Anna Asp – Pelle the Conqueror
Best Sound Design
Niels Arild Nielsen & Lars Lund – Pelle the Conqueror
Best Editing
Janus Billeskov Jansen - Pelle the Conqueror
Best Documentary Short
Ansigt til ansigt – Anne Wivel
Best Short Featurette
En hård dags nat – Elisabeth Rygård

== See also ==
- 1988 Bodil Awards
