= Rasmus Heisterberg =

Danish screenwriter

Rasmus Heisterberg (born 12 December 1974) is a Danish screenwriter. Heisterberg was born in Copenhagen, Denmark, and attended the National Film School of Denmark. He was a writer on The Girl with the Dragon Tattoo (Swedish: Män som hatar kvinnor, 2009) and A Royal Affair (Danish: En kongelig affære, 2012).
