= 8th Robert Awards =

1991 Danish film awards ceremony

- Date: 1991
- Organized by: Danish Film Academy

The 8th Robert Awards ceremony was held in 1991 in Copenhagen, Denmark. Organized by the Danish Film Academy, the awards honoured the best in Danish and foreign film of 1990.

== Honorees ==
=== Best Danish Film ===
- Dance of the Polar Bears – Birger Larsen

=== Best Actor in a Leading Role ===
- Tommy Kenter - Dance of the Polar Bears

=== Best Actress in a Leading Role ===
- Dorota Pomykała – Kajs fødselsdag

=== Best Actor in a Supporting Role ===
- Peter Schrøder - Springflod

=== Best Actress in a Supporting Role ===
- Kirsten Olesen - Springflod

=== Best Cinematography ===
- Dirk Brüel – Springflod

=== Best Sound Design ===
- Niels Arild – War of the Birds

=== Best Editing ===
- Leif Axel Kjeldsen – Springflod

=== Best Score ===
- Fini Høstrup – Springflod

=== Best Documentary Short ===
- 1700 meter fra fremtiden – Ulla Boje Rasmussen

=== Best Foreign Film ===
- Cinema Paradiso – Giuseppe Tornatore

== See also ==
- 1991 Bodil Awards
