= Island of Lost Souls (2007 film) =

- Directed by: Nikolaj Arcel
- Written by: Nikolaj Arcel; Rasmus Heisterberg
- Produced by: Sarita Christensen; Meta Louise; Foldager Sørensen
- Starring: Sara Langebæk Gaarmann; Lucas Munk Billing; Lasse Borg
- Narrated by: Nikolaj Arcel
- Cinematography: Rasmus Videbæk
- Edited by: Mikkel E. G. Nielsen
- Music by: Jane Antonia Cornish
- Release date: 9 February 2007
- Running time: 100 minutes
- Country: Denmark
- Language: Danish

Island of Lost Souls (Danish: De fortabte sjæles ø) is a 2007 Danish fantasy film directed by Nikolaj Arcel.

== Plot ==
The 14-year-old protagonist Lulu moves to a small provincial town with her mother and little brother, where she gets bored and dreams of a more magical world. Suddenly, the little brother is possessed by a spirit. With the help from a rich kid named Oliver, and Ricard, disillusioned clairvoyant and inventor, they fight the dark forces hiding on the island of the lost souls.

== Cast ==
- Sara Langebæk Gaarmann - Lulu
- Lucas Munk Billing - Sylvester
- Lasse Borg - Oliver
- Nicolaj Kopernikus - Richard
- Lars Mikkelsen - Necromancer
- Anette Støvelbæk - Beate
