= Eye of the Eagle (1997 film) =

- Directed by: Peter Flinth
- Written by: Bjarne O. Henriksen (story and original screenplay); Nikolaj Scherfig (screenplay)
- Produced by: Thomas Lydholm; Michael Haslund-Christensen
- Starring: Nijas Ørnbak-Fjeldmose; Lasse Baunkilde; Lars Lohmann; Björn Granath; Baard Owe
- Cinematography: Eric Kress
- Edited by: Morten Giese
- Music by: Søren Hyldgaard
- Production companies: Metronome Productions; Victoria Film A/S
- Distributed by: Warner & Metronome Film
- Release date: 21 March 1997
- Running time: 91 minutes
- Country: Denmark
- Language: Danish
- Budget: Danish kroner 23,000,000 (ca. US$ 6,400,000)

Eye of the Eagle (Danish: Ørnens Øje) is a 1997 Danish medieval adventure film directed by Peter Flinth. Based on an original screenplay by Bjarne O. Henriksen, it takes place in Denmark during 1218. Filming primarily took place at the Asserbo Castle ruins in Denmark, Eilean Donan Castle in Scotland, and Tisvilde Strand at Tisvildeleje in Denmark. The film won five of Denmark's Robert Awards in 1998.

== Plot ==
War is upon Denmark, and King Valdemar II sends his only son and heir in safety to Eskil, bishop of Ravensburg, who is instructed to educate the prince. As soon as the king leaves the country to go to war, the bishop makes plans about seizing the crown for himself. Accidentally the prince and the kitchen-boy Aske overhear the schemes of Eskil and his conspirators, but are seen and pursued by a one-eyed man, who wants to take revenge on the king for leaving him behind on a battlefield where he lost his eye. The eye was swallowed by an eagle, which he has tamed and now shares his sight with.

== Cast ==
- Nijas Ørnbak-Fjeldmose as prince Valdemar
- Lasse Baunkilde as kitchen-boy Aske
- Lars Lohmann as king Valdemar
- Björn Granath as bishop Eskil
- Bjørn Floberg as the one-eyed man
- Rasmus Haxen as Morten Trefinger (Threefinger)
- Kristian Halken as Gert Fredløs (the Outlawed)
- Maj Bockhahn Bjerregaard as Signe
- Baard Owe as brother Sune
- Hardy Rafn as brother Grammaticus
- Thorbjørn Hummel as count Albert
- Asger Reher as squire Mikkelsen
- Folmer Rubæk as a squire
- Steen Stig Lommer as a squire
- Lasse Lunderskov as a coachman
- Erik Wedersøe as the voice of the one-eyed man

== Production ==
Filming primarily took place at the Asserbo Castle ruins in Denmark, Eilean Donan Castle in Scotland, and Tisvilde Strand at Tisvildeleje in Denmark.

== Awards ==
The film won five of Denmark's Robert Awards in 1998.

- Best Costume Design (Manon Rasmussen)
- Best Editing (Morten Giese)
- Best Make-Up (Elisabeth Bukkehave)
- Best Screenplay (Nikolaj Scherfig)
- Best Sound (Morten Degnbol and Stig Sparre-Ulrich)

== See also ==
- List of historical drama films
