= Manon Rasmussen =

Danish costume designer (born 1951)

- Born: August 2, 1951 (age 75); Horsens, Denmark
- Education: Københavns Tilskærerakademi
- Occupation: Costume designer
- Years active: 1978–present
- Awards: Satellite Awards, 2012, Best Costume Design

Manon Rasmussen (born 2 August 1951) is a Danish costume designer.

== Education ==
Initially studying acting, from 1974 to 1975 Rasmussen was a member of Solvognen (English: Sun Chariot) theatre group. In 1976, Rasmussen began studying tailoring at Københavns Tilskærerakademi, where she specialised in theatre costume.

== Career ==
Rasmussen began her career selling clothes at Elverhøj craft store and collective. In 1978, Rasmussen worked as a costume assistant to Gitte Kolvig on Anders Refn's The Heritage (Danish: Slægten), awakening her interest for historical drama.

Rasmussen is well known for collaborating with Lars von Trier, Thomas Vinterberg, Bille August, Susanne Bier, Christoffer Boe. Beginning with 1982's Images of Liberation Rasmussen has worked on all of von Trier's feature films with the exception of Medea and The Idiots.

Rasmussen has won 17 Robert Awards for Best Costume Design making her the record-holder for the most wins and nominations in a single category.

== Filmography ==
=== Films ===
Work	Year	Credit	Notes	Ref(s)
The Ugly Stepsister	2025	Costume designer	Feature	
Bamse	2022	Costume designer	Feature	
Margrete – Queen of the North	2021	Costume designer	Feature, Robert Award for Best Costume Design	
Another Round	2020	Costume designer with Ellen Lens	Feature	
A Fortunate Man	2018	Costume designer	Feature, Robert Award for Best Costume Design	
The House That Jack Built	2018	Costume designer	Feature	
Tordenskjold & Kold	2016	Costume designer	Feature	
Itsi Bitsi	2014	Costume designer	Feature	
Nymphomaniac Director's Cut	2014	Costumes	Feature, Robert Award for Best Costume Design	
The Hunt	2013	Costume designer	Feature	
Sex, Drugs & Taxation	2013	Costume designer	Feature, Robert Award for Best Costume Design	
Nymphomaniac	2013	Costume designer	Feature	
The Passion of Marie	2012	Costume designer	Feature	
A Royal Affair	2012	Key costumer	Feature, Robert Award for Best Costume Design	
Melancholia	2011	Wardrobe	Feature	
Everything Will Be Fine	2010	Costume designer	Feature	
In a Better World	2010	Wardrobe	Feature	
Truth About Men	2010	Key costumer	Feature	
Lost in Africa	2010	Wardrobe	Feature	
Antichrist	2009	Costumes, 2. unit (Denmark)	Feature	
Above the Street Below the Water	2009	Key costumer	Feature	
Flame & Citron	2008	Costume designer	Feature, Robert Award for Best Costume Design	
The Candidate	2008	Key costumer	Feature	
Max Manus	2008	Wardrobe	Feature	
Lost Treasure II	2007	Costume designer	Feature	
The Early Years: Erik Nietzsche Part 1	2007	Key costumer	Feature	
The Lost Treasure of the Knights Templar	2006	Costume designer	Feature	
After the Wedding	2006	Wardrobe	Feature	
Drømmen	2006	Wardrobe	Feature, Robert Award for Best Costume Design	
The Boss of It All	2006	Wardrobe	Feature	
Young Andersen	2005	Costume designer	Feature, Robert Award for Best Costume Design	
Manderlay	2005	Wardrobe	Feature	
Dogville	2003	Wardrobe	Feature, Robert Award for Best Costume Design	
Stealing Rembrandt	2003	Wardrobe	Feature	
Flash of a Dream	2002	Wardrobe	Documentary	
Facing the Truth	2002	Wardrobe	Feature	
Juliane (film)	2000	Wardrobe	Feature	
Dancer in the Dark	2000	Wardrobe	Feature	
Two Penny Dance	1999	Wardrobe	Feature	
Heart of Light	1998	Wardrobe	Feature	
I Wonder Who's Kissing You Now?	1998	Wardrobe	Feature	
Eye of the Eagle	1997	Wardrobe	Feature, Robert Award for Best Costume Design	
Barbara	1997	Wardrobe	Feature	
Breaking the Waves	1996	Costume designer	Feature	
Carmen & Babyface	1995	Wardrobe	Feature	
Just a Girl	1995	Costumes	Feature, Robert Award for Best Costume Design	
My Childhood Symphony	1994	Wardrobe	Feature, Robert Award for Best Costume Design	
The Russian Singer	1993	Wardrobe	Feature	
Black Harvest	1993	Wardrobe	Feature, Robert Award for Best Costume Design	
The Boys from St. Petri	1991	Wardrobe	Feature, Robert Award for Best Costume Design	
Europa	1991	Wardrobe	Feature	
Dance of the Polar Bears	1990	Wardrobe	Feature	
Miracle in Valby	1989	Wardrobe	Feature, Robert Award for Best Costume Design	
Heaven and Hell (film)	1988	Wardrobe	Feature	
Time Out (1988 film)	1988	Wardrobe	Feature	
Epidemic	1987	Wardrobe	Feature	
Tootsiepops and Candyfloss	1987	Wardrobe	Feature	
Early Spring	1986	Wardrobe	Feature, Robert Award for Best Costume Design	
The Element of Crime	1984	Wardrobe	Feature, Robert Award for Best Costume Design	
Twist and Shout	1984	Wardrobe	Feature	
Land of Plenty	1983	Wardrobe	Feature	
Beauty and the Beast (1983 film)	1983	Wardrobe	Feature	
The Indecent Ones	1983	Costume assistant	Feature	
Images of a Relief	1982	Wardrobe	Short fiction	
The Parallel Corpse	1982	Wardrobe	Feature	
Stab in the Heart	1981	Wardrobe	Feature	
Cry Wolf	1981	Wardrobe	Feature	
The Return of Captain Klyde	1980	Wardrobe	Feature	
Next Stop Paradise	1980	Wardrobe	Feature	
The House by the Sea	1980	Property	Feature	
Johnny Larsen	1979	Wardrobe	Feature	
The Heritage (Danish: Slægten)	1978	Costume assistant	Feature	

=== Television ===
Work	Year	Credit	Notes	Ref(s)
Families Like Ours	2024	Costume designer	Mini-series	
Agent	2023	Costume designer		
The Kingdom Exodus	2022	Costume designer	Mini-series	
DNA	2019	Costume designer		
1864	2014	Costume designer	Mini-series	
klovn	2005	Wardrobe	TV series	
Lars von Trier Anecdotes	2005	Appearance	TV documentary	
Island of the Pixies	2003	Wardrobe	TV series	
Ved Stillebækken	1999	Wardrobe	TV series	
The Village (TV-series)	1991	Wardrobe	TV series	
