= Robert Awards =

Danish film prize

Robert Award
- Awarded for: Excellence in cinematic achievements
- Country: Denmark
- Presented by: Danish Film Academy
- First award: 1984
- Final award: 2025
- Website: robertprisen.dk

The Robert Award (Danish: Robert-Prisen) is a Danish film prize awarded each year by the Danish Film Academy since 1984.

== Description ==
The Robert-Prisen (Robert Award) is an annual award given by the Danish Film Academy, launched in 1984. It is the Danish equivalent of the American Oscars, British BAFTAs for films, Australian AACTA Awards or French César. The award—voted only by academy members—is an acknowledgment by Danish industry colleagues of a person's or film's outstanding contributions during the previous year.

Since 2013, awards have been given to television series and actors as well. The Robert was awarded for the first time in 1984 and is named after the statuette's creator, the Danish sculptor Robert Jacobsen.

== Categories ==
=== Current ===
Merit awards
English name	Danish name	First awarded
Best Danish Film	Årets danske spillefilm	1984
Best Director	Årets instruktør	2001
Best Actor in a Leading Role	Årets mandlige hovedrolle	1984
Best Actress in a Leading Role	Årets kvindelige hovedrolle	1984
Best Actor in a Supporting Role	Årets mandlige birolle	1984
Best Actress in a Supporting Role	Årets kvindelige birolle	1984
Best Cinematography	Årets fotograf	1984
Best Costume Design	Årets kostumier	1984
Best Editing	Årets klipper	1984
Best Makeup	Årets sminkør	1987
Best Production Design	Årets scenograf	1984
Best Score	Årets score	1984
Best Screenplay	Årets manuskript	1984
Best Song	Årets sang	2002
Best Sound Design	Årets sounddesigner	1984
Best Visual Effects	Årets visuelle effekter	2014
Best Children's Film	Årets børne- og ungdomsfilm	2002
Best Documentary Feature	Årets lange dokumentarfilm	2002
Best Documentary Short	Årets korte dokumentarfilm	1984
Best Long Fiction/Animation	Årets lange fiktion/animation	2007
Best Short Fiction/Animation	Årets korte fiktion/animation	2006
Best Danish Television Series	Årets danske tv-serie	2013
Best Short Television Series	Årets korte tv-serie	2014
Best Actor in a Leading Television Role	Årets mandlige hovedrolle – tv-serie	2013
Best Actress in a Leading Television Role	Årets kvindelige hovedrolle – tv-serie	2013
Best Actor in a Supporting Television Role	Årets mandlige birolle – tv-serie	2013
Best Actress in a Supporting Television Role	Årets kvindelige birolle – tv-serie	2013
Best Non-English Language Film	Årets ikke-engelskspråklige film	1997
Best English Language Film	Årets engelskspråklige film	1999

Special awards
English name	Danish name	First awarded
Honorary Award	Æres-Robert	1984
Special Jury Prize (Short)	Kortfilmjuryens specialpris	1995

External awards
English name	Danish name	First awarded
Audience Award	Publikumsprisen	2001
The Ib Award	Ib prisen	2013

=== Discontinued ===
English name	Danish name	First awarded	Last awarded	Notes
Best Foreign Film	Årets udenlanske film	1984	1996	Succeeded by the Robert Award for Best Non-American Film (from 1997) and the Robert Award for Best American Film (from 1999)
Best Special Effects	Årets special effects	1984	2013	Renamed to the Robert Award for Best Visual Effects (Danish: Robert Prisen for årets visuelle effekter) in 2014

== Records ==
=== People ===
The following nominees received multiple nominations (10 or more):

Nominations	Title
35	Manon Rasmussen
27	Lars von Trier
18	Nikolaj Arcel
18	Tobias Lindholm
16	Niels Arden Oplev
16	Thomas Vinterberg
13	Nils Malmros
12	Ole Christian Madsen
12	Mads Mikkelsen
11	Per Fly
10	Susanne Bier
10	Nicolas Winding Refn
10	Martin Zandvliet

The following winners received multiple awards (5 or more):

Awards	Title
17	Manon Rasmussen
15	Lars von Trier
11	Thomas Vinterberg
9	Tobias Lindholm
6	Per Fly
6	Nils Malmros
5	Nikolaj Arcel
5	Martin Zandvliet

- Manon Rasmussen holds the record for most wins and nominations in a single category with 17 and 35, especially for Best Costume Design.
- In von Trier's fourth trilogy, Depression, is the first franchise or trilogy to have sweep seven Roberts; Best Danish Film, Best Director, Best Screenplay, Best Cinematography, Best Editing, Best Sound, and Best Visual Effects.

== See also ==
- Bodil Awards
