= Danish Film Academy =

Danish film industry organisation

The Danish Film Academy (FilmAkademiet), locally known as the Danmarks Filmakademi (DFA) is a Danish organisation the promotes the film industry.

The Danish Film Academy was founded in 1982 by a number of people with professional connection to the film industry. The Academy aims to promote film as an independent art form, and its members are primarily people who work with film. The Academy's largest annual event is the Robert Award ceremony.

Jacob Neiiendam, former head of programming at Copenhagen International Film Festival from 2005 to 2007, Nordic correspondent for Screen from 1999 until 2005, and founder-director of the CPH PIX film festival (2008-2018), became chair of the academy before or during 2018. He had run the Robert Awards from 2013.
