= 37th Robert Awards =

2020 Danish film awards ceremony

- Date: 26 January 2020
- Organized by: Danish Film Academy

Highlights
- Best Film: Queen of Hearts
- Most awards: Film; Queen of Hearts (9)
- Most nominations: Film

The 37th Robert Awards ceremony, presented by Danish Film Academy, took place on 26 January 2020 virtually to honour the best in Danish film and television of 2019.

== Winners and nominees ==
The nominations were announced on 6 January 2021. Winners are listed first, highlighted in boldface, and indicated with a double dagger (‡).

=== Film ===
| **Best Danish Film**: **Queen of Hearts – Director: May el-Toukhy; Script: May el-Toukhy, and Maren Louise Käehne**‡; Danmarks sønner – Director and Script: Ulaa Salim; Before the Frost – Director and Script: Michael Noer; Onkel – Director and Script: Frelle Petersen; Daniel – Directors: Niels Arden Oplev and Anders W. Berthelsen; Script: Niels Arden Oplev and Anders W. Berthelsen | **Best Children's Film**: **Gooseboy – Director and Script: Michael Wikke and Steen Rasmussen**‡; Hacker – Director: Poul Berg; Script: Poul Berg and Kalle Bjerkø; Mugge & Vejfesten – Directors: Mikael Wulff and Anders Morgenthaler; Script: Mikael Wulff and Anders Morgenthaler; Skammerens datter II – Slangens gave – Director: Ask Hasselbalch; Script: Gunnar Järvstad; Valhalla – Director: Fenar Ahmad; Script: Adam August and Fenar Ahmad |
| **Best Director**: **May el-Toukhy – Queen of Hearts**‡; Frelle Petersen – Onkel; Michael Noer – Before the Frost; Niels Arden Oplev and Anders W. Berthelsen – Daniel; Ulaa Salim – Danmarks sønner | **Best Screenplay**: **Queen of Hearts – May el-Toukhy and Maren Louise Käehne** ‡; Onkel – Frelle Petersen; Before the Frost – Jesper Fink and Michael Noer; Psykosia – Marie Grahtø; Danmarks sønner – Ulaa Salim |
| **Best Actor in a Leading Role**: **Esben Smed – Daniel**‡; Dar Salim – Until We Fall; Gustav Lindh – Queen of Hearts; Jesper Christensen – Before the Frost; Zaki Youssef – Danmarks sønner | **Best Actress in a Leading Role**: **Trine Dyrholm – Queen of Hearts**‡; Christine Sønderris – Cutterhead; Clara Rosager – Before the Frost; Jette Søndergaard – Onkel; Victoria Carmen Sonne – Usynligt hjerte |
| **Best Actor in a Supporting Role**: **Magnus Krepper – Queen of Hearts**‡; Anders Brink Madsen – De frivillige; Anders Matthesen – De frivillige; Anders W. Berthelsen – Daniel; Elliott Crosset Hove – Before the Frost | **Best Actress in a Supporting Role**: **Sofie Torp – Daniel**‡; Amanda Collin – Harpiks; Christiane Gjellerup Koch – Ser du månen, Daniel; Ghita Nørby – Before the Frost; Victoria Carmen Sonne – Psykosia |
| **Best Production Design**: **Harpiks – Josephine Farsø**‡; Daniel – Knirke Madelung; Queen of Hearts – Mia Stensgaard; Valhalla – Peter Grant; Before the Frost – Søren Schwarzberg | **Best Cinematography**: **Queen of Hearts – Jasper Spanning**‡; Daniel – Eric Kress; Valhalla – Kasper Tuxen; Selvmordsturisten – Niels Thastum; Before the Frost – Sturla Brandth Grøvlen |
| **Best Visual Effects**: **Valhalla – Jonas Drehn and Jan Tvilling**‡; Gooseboy – Alexander Schepelern and Christian Sjöstedt; Skammerens datter II – Slangens gave – Geoffrey Hancock and Morten Jacobsen; Ser du månen, Daniel – Ivar Rystad; Psykosia – Peter Hjorth | **Best Costume Design**: **Before the Frost – Louize Nissen**‡; Harpiks – Marquet K. Lee; Queen of Hearts – Rebecca Richmond; Ser du månen, Daniel – Stine Thaning; De frivillige – Susie Bjørnvad |
| **Best Makeup**: **Harpiks – Sara Sofia Kasper**‡; Queen of Hearts – Anne Cathrine Sauerberg; Before the Frost – Bjørg Serup; Ser du månen, Daniel – Jenny Fred; Valhalla – Salla Yli-Luopa and Kristín Júlla Kristjánsdóttir | **Best Editing**: **Queen of Hearts – Rasmus Stensgaard Madsen**‡; Before the Frost – Adam Nielsen; Ser du månen, Daniel – Anne Østerud and Lars Therkelsen; Cutterhead – Jakob Juul Toldam; Harpiks – Sofie Marie Kristensen |
| **Best Score**: **Queen of Hearts – Jon Ekstrand**‡; Harpiks – Anne Gry Friis Kristensen and Andreas Pallisgaard; Skammerens datter II – Slangens gave – Jeppe Kaas; Ser du månen, Daniel – Johan Söderqvist; Cutterhead – Søs Gunver Ryberg | **Best Song**: **"One last time" from Selvmordsturisten – Written by Mikkel Hess and Kaya Wilkins; Performed by Hess is more med Okay Kaya**‡‡; "Bleed For It" from Victim of Love – Written and Performed by Julian Winding; "Mod Nord" from Gooseboy – Written by Poul Halberg and Wikke & Rasmussen; Performed by Szhirley |
| **Best Short Fiction/Animation**: **Ikki illa meint – Director and Script: Andrias Høgenni**‡; Draget – Director and Script: Christian Bengtson; Knæler – Director and Script: Roberta Reichhardt; Savnet – Director and Script: Mads Reuther; Under bølgerne, over skyerne – Director: Katrine Brocks; Script: Denise Kræmer Jacobsen and Katrine Brocks | **Best Long Fiction/Animation**: **En flirt – Director: Zinnini Elkington; Script: Marianne Lentz**‡; Forestillingen om Juliane – Director: Mads Mengel; Script: Sara Isabella Jønsson; Lille a – Director: Cecilie McNair; Script: Cecilie McNair and Christina Øster |
| **Best Documentary Short**: **Amfi – Director: Mathias Broe**‡; Morfar flytter hjemmefra? – Director: Laurits Helligsøe; Natbus – Director: Nitesh Anjaan; Sam and the Plant Next Door – Director: Ömer Sami; Villa Villekulla – Director: Patricia Bbaale Bandak | **Best Documentary Short**: **The Cave – Director: Feras Fayyad**‡; Cold Case Hammarskjöld – Director: Mads Brügger; Forglem mig ej – Director: Sun Hee Engelstoft; Krigsfotografen – Director: Boris Benjamin Bertram; Q’s Barbershop – Director: Emil Langballe |
| **Best Non-English Language Film**: **Parasite in Korean – Director: Bong Joon Ho**‡; Capernaum in Arabic – Director: Nadine Labaki; Woman at War in Icelandic – Director: Benedikt Erlingsson; Happy as Lazzaro in Italian – Director: Alice Rohrwacher; Pain and Glory in Spanish– Director: Pedro Almodóvar | **Best English Language Film**: **Joker – Director: Todd Phillips**‡; Green Book – Director: Peter Farrelly; Marriage Story – Director: Noah Baumbach; Once Upon a Time in Hollywood – Director: Quentin Tarantino; The Favourite – Director: Yorgos Lanthimos |

=== Television ===
| **Best Danish Television Series**: **Follow the Money – Producers: Caroline Schlüter Bingestam, Jacob Jarek and Anders Toft Andersen; Writer: Jeppe Gjervig Gram; Director: Søren Balle**‡; Seaside Hotel – Producer: Michael Bille Frandsen; Writers: Hanna Lundblad and Stig Thorsboe; Director: Hans Fabian Wullenweber; Den som dræber – fanget af mørket – Producers: Zire Schucany, Jonas Allen and Peter Bose; Writer: Ina Bruhn; Director: Carsten Myllerup; Fred til lands – Producers: Jesper Morthorst and Rikke Lassen; Writers: Christian Torpe and Marie Østerbye; Director: Louise Friedberg; A Fortunate Man – Producers: Thomas Heinesen and Karin Trolle; Writesr: Anders August and Bille August; Director: Bille August | **Best Short Television Series**: **31 – Producer: Mikkel Herforth; Writers: Jesper Zuschlag and Julie Rudbæk; Directors: Jesper Zuschlag and Julie Rudbæk**‡; Doggystyle – Producer: Birgitte Rask; Writer: Anna Emma Haudal; Director: Anna Emma Haudal; Forhøret – Producers: Jonas Allen and Peter Bose; Writers: Christoffer Boe and Jakob Weis; Director: Christoffer Boe; Kemohjerne – Producer: Nadja Nørgaard Kristensen; Writers: Kristian Håskjold and Johan Wang; Director: Kristian Håskjold; Tinka og kongespillet – Producer: Sille Sterll; Writers: Flemming Klem, Ina Bruhn and Stefan Jaworski; Director: Christian Grønvall |
| **Best Actor**: **Morten Hee Andersen as Mike on Fred til lands**‡; Esben Smed as Nicky Rasmussen on Follow the Money; Esben Smed as Per Sidenius on A Fortunate Man; Thomas Hwan as Alf Rybjerg on Follow the Money; Ulrich Thomsen as Bjørn Rasmussen on Forhøret | **Best Actress in a Leading Television Role**: **Maria Rich as Anna Berg Hansen on Follow the Money (DR)**‡; Alba August as Simone Andersen on The Rain (Netflix); Katrine Greis-Rosenthal as Jakobe Salomon on The Investigation (TV2); Lene Maria Christensen as Bibi on Fred til lands (DR); Rosemarie Mosbæk as Asta on Doggystyle (DR3) |
| **Best Actor in a Supporting Television Role**: **Jacob Hauberg Lohmann as Søren on Follow the Money (DR)**‡; Anders Juul as Martin on Fred til lands (DR); Claus Riis Østergaard as Peter on Fred til lands (DR); Dar Salim as Milad on Fred til lands (DR); Lars Mikkelsen as Holger Lang on Forhøret (TV 3) | **Best Actress in a Supporting Television Role**: **Josephine Park as Jose on Doggystyle (DR3)**‡; Amalie Lindegård as Laura on 31 (Xee); Anette Støvelbæk as Ruth Madsen on Sygeplejeskolen (TV2); Marijana Jankovic as Anna on Fred til lands (DR); Trine Dyrholm as Susanne Egholm on Forhøret (TV 3) |
