= 40th Robert Awards =

2023 Danish film awards ceremony

- Date: 4 February 2023
- Organized by: Danish Film Academy

Highlights
- Best Film: Holy Spider
- Most awards: Film; Holy Spider (11); Television; Carmen Curlers and The Orchestra (3)
- Most nominations: Film; Holy Spider (16); Television; Carmen Curlers (7)

The 40th Robert Awards ceremony, presented by Danish Film Academy on 4 February 2023, to honour the best in Danish film and television of 2022. The ceremony took place at the Tivoli Hotel & Congress Centre in Copenhagen, Denmark and was hosted by actor and comedian Frederik Cilius.

Crime drama film Holy Spider won eleven awards out of sixteen nominations, including Best Danish Film. It was followed by A Lucky Man with two awards.

Historical drama series Carmen Curlers and workplace comedy series The Orchestra won three awards each in the television field, the former received the most nominations with seven.

== Winners and nominees ==
The nominations were announced on 6 January 2023. Winners are listed first, highlighted in boldface, and indicated with a double dagger (‡).

=== Film ===
**Best Danish Film**: **Holy Spider – Jacob Jarek, Sol Bondy, Ali Abbasi, and Afshin Kamran Bahrami**‡; As in Heaven – Lise Orheim Stender, Jesper Morthorst, and Tea Lindeburg; Chrysanthemum – Daniel Mühlendorph and Christian Bengtson; Godland – Eva Jakobsen, Mikkel Jersin, Katrin Pors, and Hlynur Pálmason; Rose – Thomas Heinesen and Niels Arden Oplev; Speak No Evil – Jacob Jarek, Christian Tafdrup, and Mads Tafdrup	**Best Children and Youth Film**: **Little Allan: The Human Antenna – Thomas Heinesen, Trine Heidegaard, and Amalie Næsby Fick**‡; All I Want for Christmas: The Magic Time Machine – Christian Dyekjær, Lars T. Therkildsen, and Morten Rasmussen; Mugge og hans mærkelige hjerne – Mikael Wulff, Anders Morgenthaler, Pernille Bønløkke Toustrup, Julie Lind-Holm, and Jonas Bagger; My Robot Brother – Frederik Nørgaard and Jasmine Hermann Naghizadeh; Nothing – Trine Piil, Seamus McNally, Thomas Lydholm, Janine Jackowski, and Mette Hesthaven; Pretty Young Thing – Tilde Harkamp, Line Mørkeby, and Marcella Dichmann
**Best Director**: **Ali Abbasi – Holy Spider**‡; Christian Tafdrup – Speak No Evil; Frelle Petersen – Forever; Hlynur Pálmason – Godland; Niels Arden Oplev – Rose; Tea Lindeburg – As in Heaven
**Best Original Screenplay**: **Holy Spider – Ali Abbasi and Afshin Kamran Bahrami**‡; Chrysanthemum – Christian Bengtson; Forever – Frelle Petersen; Godland – Hlynur Pálmason; Rose – Niels Arden Oplev; Speak No Evil – Christian Tafdrup and Mads Tafdrup	**Best Adapted Screenplay**: **As in Heaven – Tea Lindeburg**‡; Little Allan: The Human Antenna – Amalie Næsby Fick and Thomas Porsager; A Matter of Trust – Annette K. Olesen and Maren Louise Käehne; Mugge og hans mærkelige hjerne – Mikael Wulff and Pernille Bønløkke Toustrup; My Robot Brother – Frederik Nørgaard; Nothing – Trine Piil
**Best Actor in a Leading Role**: **Anders W. Berthelsen – A Lucky Man as Flemming Jørgensen**‡; Elliott Crosset Hove – Godland as Lucas; Mehdi Bajestani – Holy Spider as Saeed Hanaei; Morten Burian – Speak No Evil as Bjørn; Morten Hee Andersen – Chrysanthemum as Anders; Ole Sørensen – Forever as Egon	**Best Actress in a Leading Role**: **Zar Amir Ebrahimi – Holy Spider as Arezoo Rahimi**‡; Flora Ofelia Hofmann Lindahl – As in Heaven as Lise; Josephine Park – Attachment as Maja; Sidsel Siem Koch – Speak No Evil as Louise; Sofie Gråbøl – Rose as Inger; Vic Carmen Sonne – Godland as Anna
**Best Actor in a Supporting Role**: **Arash Ashtiani – Holy Spider as Sharifi**‡; David Dencik – Attachment as Lev; Fedja van Huêt – Speak No Evil as Patrick; Henrik Birch – A Lucky Man as Fatter; Henrik Birch – Chrysanthemum as Thomas; Jacob Lohmann – Godland as Carl	**Best Actress in a Supporting Role**: **Lene Maria Christensen – Rose as Ellen**‡; Alice Rahimi – Holy Spider as Somayeh; Christine Albeck Børge – Baby Pyramid as Gry; Forouzan Jamshidnejad – Holy Spider as Fatima Hanaei; Ida Cæcilie Rasmussen – As in Heaven as Mor Anna; Johanne Louise Schmidt – A Lucky Man as Käte Jørgensen
**Best Production Design**: **Holy Spider – Lina Nordqvist**‡; As in Heaven – Jesper Clausen; Chrysanthemum – Josefine Else Larsen; A Lucky Man – Heidi Plugge; Rose – Knirke Madelung; Speak No Evil – Sabine Hviid	**Best Cinematography**: **Holy Spider – Nadim Carlsen**‡; As in Heaven – Marcel Zyskind; Baby Pyramid – Sine Vadstrup Brooker; Chrysanthemum – David Bauer; Godland – Maria von Hausswolff; A Lucky Man – Jørgen Johansson
**Best Costume Design**: **Godland – Nina Grønlund**‡; As in Heaven – Nina Grønlund; Forever – Rebecca Richmond; Holy Spider – Hanadi Khurma; A Lucky Man – Manon Rasmussen; Out of the Darkness – Grith Holm Deleuran	**Best Makeup**: **A Lucky Man – Anita Anderson and Morten Jacobsen**‡; As in Heaven – Christina Dahlin; Godland – Katrine Tersgov; Holy Spider – Farah Jadaane; Speak No Evil – Robert Stouthamer; This Life 2: Those Left Behind – Charlotte Hertz and Tina Helmark
**Best Editing**: **Holy Spider – Olivia Neergaard-Holm and Hayedeh Safiyari**‡; As in Heaven – Åsa Mossberg; Godland – Julius Krebs Damsbo; A Lucky Man – Martin Schade; Rose – Anne Østerud and Lars Therkelsen; Speak No Evil – Nicolaj Monberg	**Best Sound Design**: **Holy Spider – Rasmus Winther Jensen**‡; As in Heaven – Peter Albrechtsen; Chrysanthemum – Andreas Sandborg; A House Made of Splinters – Heikki Kossi and Peter Albrechtsen; A Lucky Man – Kristian Selin Eidnes Andersen; Speak No Evil – Marco Vermaas
**Best Score**: **Holy Spider – Martin Dirkov**‡; Attachment – Johan Carøe; Baby Pyramid – Ida Duelund and Maria Jagd; Chrysanthemum – Kaspar Kaae; A House Made of Splinters – Uno Helmersson; Speak No Evil – Sune "Køter" Kølster	**Best Song**: **"En drømmer mere" from Esther's Orchestra – Music and Lyric: Annika Aakjær and Aske Bode; Performer: Annika Aakjær**‡; "All the Things We Do" from Lykkelige omstændigheder – Music and Lyric: Mads Langer, Sune Rose Wagner and Grace Tither; Performer: Mads Langer; "Mig der kalder" from Little Allan: The Human Antenna – Music and Lyric: Laurits Emanuel; Performer: Fyr og Flamme
**Best Short Fiction/Animation**: **Nest – Hlynur Pálmason, Eva Jakobsen, Mikkel Jersin, and Katrin Pors**‡; Det ottende sakramente – Asta Stuhr, Julie Carla Mortensen, and Jahfar Muataz; Hungud – Maria Møller Christoffersen, Penelope Bjerregaard, and Sara Hjort Ditlevsen; Katastrofer – Asser Bo Paludan and Tone Ottilie; Middagen – Ditte Juel and Marco Lawson	**Best Visual Effects**: **Holy Spider – Peter Hjorth**‡; All I Want for Christmas: The Magic Time Machine – Jonas Ussing, Stine Sørensen, and Dagmara Kaczmarek; As in Heaven – Esben Syberg; Chrysanthemum – Alexander Schepelern; Out of the Darkness – Peter Hjorth and Hummer Højmark; This Life 2: Those Left Behind – Martin Madsen
**Best Documentary Feature**: **A House Made of Splinters – Monica Hellström and Simon Lereng Wilmont**‡; Into the Ice – Malene Flindt Pedersen and Lars Henrik Ostenfeld; The Last Human – Rikke Tambo Andersen, Rie Hougaard, and Ivalo Frank; The Lost Leonardo – Andreas Dalsgaard, Christoph Jörg, and Andreas Koefoed; Mr. Graversen – Mathilde Hvid Lippmann and Michael Graversen	**Best Documentary Short**: **En film, der måske handler om fremtiden – Mads-August Hertz and Josefine Exner**‡; Ghosts of Moria – Michael Graversen, Michael Graversen, and Florian Elabdi; Organiseret vildskab – Malene Flindt Pedersen and Phie Ambo; Under havet – Mette Mikkelsen and Jannik Splidsboel; Vores børnehjem – Mette Mailand and Ulla Søe
**Best Non-English-language Feature**: **The Worst Person in the World in Norwegian – Joachim Trier; Distributed by Camera Film**‡; Beautiful Beings in Icelandic – Guðmundur Arnar Guðmundsson; Distributed by REEL Pictures; Decision to Leave in Korean – Park Chan-wook; Distributed by Camera Film; Drive My Car in Japanese – Ryusuke Hamaguchi; Distributed by Camera Film; Rimini in German – Ulrich Seidl; Distributed by Øst for Paradis	**Best English-language Feature**: **Triangle of Sadness – Ruben Östlund; Distributed by SF Studios**‡; Belfast – Kenneth Branagh; Distributed by United International Pictures; Licorice Pizza – Paul Thomas Anderson; Distributed by SF Studios; The Lost Daughter – Maggie Gyllenhaal; Distributed by SF Studios; Moonage Daydream – Brett Morgen; Distributed by United International Pictures

==== Films with multiple nominations and awards ====
Films that received multiple nominations
Nominations	Film
16	Holy Spider
12	As in Heaven
11	Speak No Evil
10	Godland
9	Chrysanthemum
9	A Lucky Man
8	Rose
4	Forever
3	Attachment
3	Baby Pyramid
3	A House Made of Splinters
3	Little Allan: The Human Antenna
2	All I Want for Christmas: The Magic Time Machine
2	Mugge og hans mærkelige hjerne
2	My Robot Brother
2	Nothing
2	Out of the Darkness
2	This Life 2: Those Left Behind

Films that received multiple awards
Awards	Film
11	Holy Spider
2	A Lucky Man

=== Television ===
**Best Danish Television Series**: **Carmen Curlers (DR)**‡; Borgen – Power & Glory (DR); Dag & nat (TV 2); Drømmeren – Becoming Karen Blixen (Viaplay); The Kingdom: Exodus (DR/Viaplay)	**Best Short Television Series**: **The Orchestra (DR)**‡; Baby Fever (Netflix); Bad Bitch (DR); Doggystyle (DR); Klovn (TV 2 Zulu)
**Best Actor in a Leading Television Role**: **Fredrik Cilius – The Orchestra as Bo (DR)**‡; Mikael Persbrandt – The Kingdom: Exodus as Stig Helmer Jr. (DR/Viaplay); Mikkel Boe Følsgaard – Borgen – Power & Glory as Asger Holm Kirkegaard (DR); Morten Hee Andersen – Carmen Curlers as Axel Byvang (DR); Nicolai Jørgensen – Doggystyle as Fnuggie (DR)	**Best Actress in a Leading Television Role**: **Maria Rossing – Carmen Curlers as Birthe Windfeld (DR)**‡; Bodil Jørgensen – The Kingdom: Exodus as Karen Svensson (DR/Viaplay); Diêm Camille – Bad Bitch as Nikki (DR); Josephine Park – Baby Fever as Nana (Netflix); Sidse Babett Knudsen – Borgen – Power & Glory as Birgitte Nyborg (DR)
**Best Actor in a Supporting Television Role**: **Nicolai Jørgensen – Carmen Curlers as Frans (DR)**‡; Afshin Firouzi – Dag & nat as Milad (TV 2); Caspar Phillipson – The Orchestra as Simon (DR); Lars Mikkelsen – The Kingdom: Exodus as Pontopidan (DR/Viaplay); Lars Ranthe – Carmen Curlers as Jørgen (DR)	**Best Actress in a Supporting Television Role**: **Emma Sehested Høeg – The Orchestra as Elin (DR)**‡; Birgitte Hjort Sørensen – Borgen – Power & Glory as Katrine Fønsmark (DR); Fanny Leander Bornedal – Carmen Curlers as Kathrine (DR); Rosalinde Mynster – Carmen Curlers as Tove (DR); Tuva Novotny – The Kingdom: Exodus as Anna (DR/Viaplay)

==== Shows with multiple nominations and awards ====
Shows that received multiple nominations
Nominations	Film
7	Carmen Curlers
5	The Kingdom: Exodus
4	Borgen – Power & Glory
4	The Orchestra
2	Baby Fever
2	Dag & nat
2	Doggystyle

Shows that received multiple awards
Awards	Film
3	Carmen Curlers
3	The Orchestra
