= 39th Robert Awards =

2022 Danish film awards ceremony

- Date: 5 February 2022
- Organized by: Danish Film Academy

Highlights
- Best Film: Persona Non Grata
- Most awards: Film; Flee (4); Television; The Chestnut Man (4)
- Most nominations: Film; Margrete: Queen of the North (13); Television; The Chestnut Man (6)

The 39th Robert Awards ceremony, presented by Danish Film Academy, took place on 5 February 2022 at the Tivoli Hotel & Congress Centre in Copenhagen, Denmark to honour the best in Danish film and television of 2021.

== Winners and nominees ==
The nominations were announced on 4 January 2022. Winners are listed first, highlighted in boldface, and indicated with a double dagger (‡).

=== Film ===
**Best Danish Film**: **Persona Non Grata – Producer: Daniel Mühlendorph; Director: Lisa Jespersen; Screenplay: Lisa Jespersen and Sara Isabella Jønsson**‡; Margrete: Queen of the North – Producers: Birgitte Skov and Lars Bredo Rahbek; Director: Charlotte Sieling; Screenplay: Jesper Fink, Maya Ilsøe and Charlotte Sieling; The Pact – Producers: Jesper Morthorst and Karin Trolle; Director: Bille August; Screenplay: Christian Torpe; The Shadow in My Eye – Producers: Jonas Allen and Peter Bose; Director and Screenplay: Ole Bornedal; The Venus Effect – Producers: Rikke Sasja Lassen and Lise Orheim Stender; Director and Screenplay: Anna Emma Haudal	**Best Children's Film**: **Checkered Ninja 2 – Producers: Trine Heidegaard and Anders Mastrup; Director: Anders Matthesen and Thorbjørn Christoffersen; Screenplay: Anders Matthesen**‡; Busters World – Producers: Barbara Crone and Hans Bülow Ungfelt; Director: Martin Miehe-Renard; Screenplay: Jesper Nikolaj Christiansen; The Seekers – Producers: Sarita Christensen and Mette Valbjørn Skøtt; Director: Philip Th. Pedersen; Screenplay: Pelle Møller
**Best Director**: **Lisa Jespersen – Persona Non Grata**‡; Anders Matthesen and Thorbjørn Christoffersen – Checkered Ninja 2; Anna Emma Haudal – The Venus Effect; Bille August – The Pact; Charlotte Sieling – Margrete: Queen of the North
**Best Original Screenplay**: **Persona Non Grata – Lisa Jespersen and Sara Isabella Jønsson**‡; Margrete: Queen of the North – Jesper Fink, Maya Ilsøe and Charlotte Sieling; The Shadow in My Eye – Ole Bornedal; A Taste of Hunger – Christoffer Boe and Tobias Lindholm; The Venus Effect – Anna Emma Haudal	**Best Adapted Screenplay**: **Checkered Ninja 2 – Anders Matthesen; based on the novel of the same name by Matthesen**‡; The Marco Effect – Anders F. August, Thomas Porsager and Martin Zandvliet; based on the novel of the same name by Jussi Adler-Olsen; The Pact – Christian Torpe; based on the memoir The Pact: My Friendship with Isak Dinesen by Thorkild Bjørnvig
**Best Actor in a Leading Role**: **Simon Bennebjerg – The Pact as Thorkild Bjørnvig**‡; Anders Matthesen – Checkered Ninja 2 as TN / Onkel Stewart / Sirene / Jørn / Sune / Various (voice); Joachim Fjeldstrup – The Blue Orchid as Casper; Nikolaj Coster-Waldau – A Taste of Hunger as Carsten; Søren Malling – Margrete: Queen of the North as Peder Jensen Lodehat	**Best Actress in a Leading Role**: **Birthe Neumann – The Pact as Karen Blixen**‡; Johanne Milland Pedersen – The Venus Effect as Liv; Rosalinde Mynster – Persona Non Grata as Laura; Trine Dyrholm – Margrete: Queen of the North as Queen Margrete; Victoria Carmen Sonne – Miss Osaka as Ines
**Best Actor in a Supporting Role**: **Jakob Oftebro – Margrete: Queen of the North as Man from Graudenz**‡; Adam Ild Rohweder – Persona Non Grata as Jannik; Alex Høgh Andersen – The Shadow in My Eye as Frederik; Jesper Groth – Persona Non Grata as David; Lars Mikkelsen – The Venus Effect as Klaus	**Best Actress in a Supporting Role**: **Josephine Park – The Venus Effect as Andrea**‡; Anne Sofie Wanstrup – Persona Non Grata as Catrine; Asta Kamma August – The Pact as Benedicte; Bodil Jørgensen – Persona Non Grata as Jane; Fanny Leander Bornedal – The Shadow in My Eye as Teresa
**Best Production Design**: **Margrete: Queen of the North – Søren Schwarzberg**‡; The Pact – Jette Lehmann; The Penultimate – Sabine Hviid and Kristina Kovacs; The Shadow in My Eye – Sabine Hviid; The Venus Effect – Sabine Hviid and Helle Lygum Justesen	**Best Cinematography**: **Kandis for Life – Stroud Rohde Pearce**‡; Margrete: Queen of the North – Rasmus Videbæk; The Penultimate – Jacob Sofussen; Persona Non Grata – Manuel Alberto Claro; The Shadow in My Eye – Lasse Frank
**Best Costume Design**: **Margrete: Queen of the North – Manon Rasmussen**‡; The Pact – Anne-Dorthe Eskildsen; Persona Non Grata – Juan Bastias; The Shadow in My Eye – Manon Rasmussen; The Venus Effect – Sascha Valbjørn	**Best Makeup**: **The Shadow in My Eye – Elizabeth Bukkehave**‡; Margrete: Queen of the North – AnnaCarin Lock; The Pact – Dennis Knudsen, Susanne Herredsbjerg Søbye and Morten Jacobsen; A Taste of Hunger – Christina Dahlin and Henrik Steen; The Venus Effect – Christina Vestergård Prip
**Best Editing**: **Flee – Janus Billeskov Jansen**‡; Kandis for Life – Denniz Göl Bertelsen; The Pact – Anne Østerud and Janus Billeskov Jansen; The Shadow in My Eye – Anders Villadsen; The Venus Effect – Sofie Marie Kristensen	**Best Sound Design**: **Flee – Edward Björner and Tormod Ringnes**‡; Checkered Ninja 2 – Oskar Skriver and Bo Asdal; Margrete: Queen of the North – Rune Palving; The Shadow in My Eye – Nino Jacobsen; A Taste of Hunger – Eddie Simonsen and Morten Green
**Best Score**: **Flee – Uno Helmersson**‡; Checkered Ninja 2 – Christian Vinten; Miss Osaka – Yasuaki Shimizu, Johan Carøe and Kwamie Liv; Persona Non Grata – Mike Sheridan; The Venus Effect – Jenny Rossander	**Best Song**: **"The Last Call" from The Venus Effect – Music and Lyric: Jenny Rossander and Christian Schousboe Vium; Performer: Lydmor**‡; "Bad Boy" from Checkered Ninja 2 – Music and Lyric: KewanLiggerBeatetNormal; Performer: Anders Matthesen; "Hey Buster" from Busters World – Music and Lyric: Kasper Holm Larsen, Mich Hedin Hansen, Alex Stacy and Ingrid Andress; Performer: Joey Moe; "Lullaby for Oluf" from Margrete: Queen of the North – Music, Lyric and Performer: Rebekka Karijord and Jon Ekstrand; "Traitors" from The Marco Effect – Music, Lyric and Performer: SAVEUS
**Best Short Fiction/Animation**: **Wild Minds – Producers: Johannes Rothaus Nørregaard & Laura Valentiner-Bohse; Director: Hannah Elbke; Screenplay: Henrik Binger and Hannah Elbke**‡; Amourteur – Producer: Jeppe Wowk; Director: Sylvia Le Fanu; Screenplay: Mads Lind Knudsen and Sylvia Le Fanu; BUFF COPS – Producer: Jenny Mattesen; Director and Screenplay: Camilla Kaufmann; Inherent – Producer: Anna Dammegaard Søllested; Director and Screenplay: Nicolai G. H. Johansen; It's so Charming – Producer: Miki Schack; Director: Svend Colding; Screenplay: Pernille Hyllegaard	**Best Visual Effects**: **The Shadow in My Eye – Nikolas D'Andrade, Sébastien Caudron and Mikael Windelin**‡; The Blue Orchid – Birk Von Brockdorff and Gustav Pontoppidan; Margrete: Queen of the North – Thomas Dyg; The Marco Effect – Martin Madsen; A Taste of Hunger – Jeppe Bingestam
**Best Documentary Feature**: **Flee – Producers: Monica Hellström, Signe Byrge Sørensen and Charlotte de la Gournerie; Director: Jonas Poher Rasmussen**‡; Cannon Arm and the Arcade Quest – Producer: Katrine A. Sahlstrøm; Director: Mads Hedegaard; Dark Blossom – Producer: Mathilde Hvid Lippmann; Director: Frigge Fri; Kandis for Life – Producer: Maria Møller Christoffersen; Director: Jesper Dalgaard; President – Producers: Signe Byrge Sørensen and Joslyn Barnes; Director: Camilla Nielsson	**Best Documentary Short**: **Love Bound – Producer: Vibeke Vogel; Director: Vibe Mogensen**‡; Desire – Producer: Jenny Mattesen; Director: Anna Eline Friis-Rasmussen; From Your Mom – Producer: Bo Mortensen; Director: Anne-Grethe Bjarup Riis; Imagining My Father – Producers: Selma Jusufbegović and Mette Mikkelsen; Director: Emil Nørgaard Munk; Kraftenlos – Producer: Asser Bo Paludan; Director: Søren Brydesen
**Best Non-English-language Feature**: **The Innocents in Norwegian – Directed by Eskil Vogt; Distributed by Camera Film**‡; The Hand of God in Italian – Directed by Paolo Sorrentino; Distributed by Angel Films A/S and Netflix; Minari in Korean and English – Directed by Lee Isaac Chung; Distributed by Scanbox Entertainment; Quo Vadis, Aida? in Bosnian – Directed by Jasmila Žbanić; Distributed by Angel Films A/S; The Truffle Hunters in Italian – Directed by Michael Dweck and Gregory Kershaw; Distributed by Camera Film	**Best English-language Feature**: **Nomadland – Directed by Chloé Zhao; Distributed by The Walt Disney Company Nordic**‡; Dune – Directed by Denis Villeneuve; Distributed by SF Studios; The Father – Directed by Florian Zeller; Distributed by Angel Films A/S; The Power of the Dog – Directed by Jane Campion; Distributed by Angel Films A/S and Netflix; Promising Young Woman – Directed by Emerald Fennell; Distributed by United International Pictures; Sound of Metal – Directed by Darius Marder; Distributed by Camera Film

==== Films with multiple nominations and awards ====
Films that received multiple nominations
Nominations	Film
13	Margrete: Queen of the North
12	The Venus Effect
11	Persona Non Grata
11	The Shadow in My Eye
10	The Pact
7	Checkered Ninja 2
5	A Taste of Hunger
4	Flee
3	Kandis for Life
3	The Marco Effect
2	The Blue Orchid
2	Busters World
2	Miss Osaka
2	The Penultimate

Films that received multiple awards
Awards	Film
4	Flee
3	Margrete: Queen of the North
3	Persona Non Grata
2	Checkered Ninja 2
2	The Pact
2	The Shadow in My Eye
2	The Venus Effect

=== Television ===
**Best Danish Television Series**: **The Chestnut Man (Netflix) – Screenplay: Dorte W. Høgh, Søren Sveistrup and David Sandreuter; Producers: Morten Kjems Hytten Juhl and Stine Meldgaard Madsen; Director: Mikkel Serup**‡; Absolute Beginners (DR) – Director and Screenplay: Thora Lorentzen; Producer: Rikke Tambo; Blinded: Those Who Kill (Viaplay) – Screenplay: Ina Bruhn; Producers: Jonas Allen, Peter Bose and Caroline Schlüter; Director: Jonas Alexander Arnby; Equinox (Netflix) – Screenplay: Tea Lindeburg; Producer: Dorthe Riis Lauridsen; Director: Søren Balle; Snow Angels (DR) – Screenplay: Mette Heeno; Producer: Georgie Mathew; Director: Anna Zackrisson	**Best Short Television Series**: **Outlaw (DR3) – Screenplay: Babak Vakili and Malthe Jagd Miehe-Renard; Producer: Siri Bøge Dynesen; Director: Laurits Flensted-Jensen**‡; 33 (Xee) – Director and Screenplay: Julie Rudbæk and Jesper Zuschlag; Producer: Maj-Britt Landin; Elves (Netflix); Screenplay: Stefan Jaworski; Producer: Elise H. Lund; Director: Roni Ezra; Face to Face (Viaplay) – Screenplay: Christoffer Boe and Anna Juul; Producers: Peter Bose and Jonas Allen; Director: Christoffer Boe; Kamikaze (HBO Max) – Screenplay: Johanne Algren; Producer: Ditte Milsted; Director: Kaspar Munk
**Best Actor in a Leading Television Role**: **Besir Zeciri as Mohammed on Outlaw (DR3)**‡; Carsten Bjørnlund as Thomas Beckmann on White Sands (TV 2); Mikkel Boe Følsgaard as Mark Hess on The Chestnut Man (Netflix); Simon Bennebjerg as Noah on Lover (DR3); Simon Kvamm as Andreas on Guru (DR)	**Best Actress in a Leading Television Role**: **Danica Curcic as Naia Thulin on The Chestnut Man (Netflix)**‡; Emma Sehested Høeg as Emma on Guilt (DR2+); Maria Cordsen as Ida on Outlaw (DR3); Maria Reuther as Julie on Kamikaze (HBO Max); Trine Dyrholm as Susanne Egholm on Face to Face (Viaplay)
**Best Actor in a Supporting Television Role**: **David Dencik as Simon Genz on The Chestnut Man (Netflix)**‡; Afshin Firouzi as Abdallah on Outlaw (DR3); Anders Matthesen as Psyko-Bo on Kamikaze (HBO Max); Besir Zeciri as David on Phantom Feelings (Xee); Esben Dalsgaard as Steen Hartung on The Chestnut Man (Netflix)	**Best Actress in a Supporting Television Role**: **Iben Dorner as Rosa Hartung on The Chestnut Man (Netflix)**‡; Amalie Lindegaard as Laura on 33 (Xee); Danica Curcic as Louise on Face to Face (Viaplay); Emma Sehested Høeg as Katrine on Limboland (Xee); Fanny Leander Bornedal as Sapphire on Face to Face (Viaplay)

==== Shows with multiple nominations and awards ====
Shows that received multiple nominations
Nominations	Film
6	The Chestnut Man
4	Face to Face
4	Outlaw
3	Kamikaze
2	33

Shows that received multiple awards
Awards	Film
4	The Chestnut Man
2	Outlaw
