= Robert Award for Best Actress in a Supporting Television Role =

Danish Film Academy award

The Robert Award for Best Actress in a Supporting Television Role (Danish: Robert Prisen for årets kvindelige birolle – tv-serie) is one of the merit awards presented by the Danish Film Academy at the annual Robert Awards ceremony. The award has been handed out since 2013.

== Honorees ==
=== 2010s ===
- 2013: Birthe Neumann for Julestjerner
- 2014: Camilla Bendix for Broen II
- 2015: Lene Maria Christensen for The Legacy
- 2016: Lene Maria Christensen for The Legacy
- 2017: Bodil Jørgensen for Rytteriets jul
- 2018: Lene Maria Christensen for The Legacy
- 2019: Josephine Park for Doggystyle

=== 2020s ===
- 2020: Josephine Park for Doggystyle
- 2021: Christine Albeck Børge for Ulven kommer
- 2022: Iben Dorner for The Chestnut Man
- 2023: Emma Sehested Høeg for Orkestret
- 2024: Laura Christensen for Prisoner
- 2025: Victoria Carmen Sonne for Bullshit
- 2026: Maria Cordsen for The Asset
