= 33rd Robert Awards =

2016 Danish film awards ceremony

- Date: 7 February 2016
- Site: Tivoli Hotel & Congress Centre
- Organized by: Danish Film Academy

Highlights
- Best Film: Land of Mine
- Best Direction: Martin Zandvliet; Land of Mine
- Best Actor: Ulrich Thomsen; Sommeren '92
- Best Actress: Tuva Novotny; Krigen

The 33rd Robert Awards ceremony was held on 7 February 2016 in Tivoli Hotel & Congress Centre in Copenhagen, Denmark. Organized by the Danish Film Academy, the awards honored the best in Danish and foreign film of 2015.

== Honorees ==
=== Best Danish Film ===
- Land of Mine – Martin Zandvliet

=== Best Children's Film ===
- The Shamer's Daughter – Kenneth Kainz

=== Best Director ===
- Martin Zandvliet – Land of Mine

=== Best Screenplay ===
- Martin Zandvliet – Land of Mine (Best original screenplay)
- Anders Thomas Jensen – The Shamer's Daughter (Best adapted script)

=== Best Actor in a Leading Role ===
- Ulrich Thomsen – Sommeren '92

=== Best Actress in a Leading Role ===
- Tuva Novotny – Krigen

=== Best Actor in a Supporting Role ===
- Nicolas Bro – Mænd og Høns

=== Best Actress in a Supporting Role ===
- Trine Dyrholm – Lang historie kort

=== Best Production Design ===
- Mia Stensgaard – Mænd og Høns

=== Best Cinematography ===
- Camilla Hjelm Knudsen – Land of Mine

=== Best Costume Design ===
- Kicki Ilander – The Shamer's Daughter

=== Best Makeup ===
- Anne Cathrine Sauerberg, Morten Jacobsen og Thomas Foldberg – Mænd og Høns

=== Best Editing ===
- Molly Malene Stensgaard & Per Sandholt – Land of Mine

=== Best Sound Design ===
- Peter Albrechtsen – The Idealist

=== Best Score ===
- Jeppe Kaas – The Shamer's Daughter

=== Visual Effects ===
- Martin Madsen & Morten Jacobsen – The Shamer's Daughter

=== Best Short Fiction/Animation ===
- Mommy – Milad Alami

=== Best Long Fiction/Animation ===
- Lulu – Caroline Sascha Cogez

=== Best Documentary Short ===
- Home Sweet Home – Katrine Philp

=== Best Documentary Feature ===
- The Man Who Saved the World – Peter Anthony

=== Best Short Television Series ===
- Ditte og Louise – Niclas Bendixen

=== Best Danish Television Series ===
- The Legacy – Jesper Christensen

=== Best Actress in a Leading Television Role ===
- Trine Dyrholm – The Legacy

=== Best Actor in a Leading Television Role ===
- Carsten Bjørnlund – The Legacy

=== Best Actress in a Supporting Television Role ===
- Lene Maria Christensen – The Legacy

=== Best Actor in a Supporting Television Role ===
- Jesper Christensen – The Legacy

=== Best American Film ===
- Birdman – Alejandro G. Iñárritu

=== Best Non-American Film ===
- Mommy directed by Xavier Dolan

=== The Ib Award ===
- Signe Byrge Sørensen

=== Audience Award ===
- Land of Mine – as "Blockbuster Publikumsprisen"

== See also ==
- 2016 Bodil Awards
