= Robert Award for Best Actor in a Leading Television Role =

Danish Film Academy award

The Robert Award for Best Actor in a Leading Television Role (Danish: Robert Prisen for årets mandlige hovedrolle – tv-serie) is one of the merit awards presented by the Danish Film Academy at the annual Robert Awards ceremony. The award has been handed out since 2013.

== Honorees ==
=== 2010s ===
- 2013: Nikolaj Lie Kaas – Forbrydelsen 3
- 2014: Kim Bodnia – Broen II
- 2015: Carsten Bjørnlund – The Legacy
- 2016: Carsten Bjørnlund – The Legacy
- 2017: Thomas Bo Larsen – Follow the Money
- 2018: Lars Mikkelsen – Herrens Veje
- 2019: Lars Mikkelsen – Herrens Veje

=== 2020s ===
- 2020: Morten Hee Andersen – Fred til lands
- 2021: Bjarne Henriksen – Ulven kommer
- 2022: Besir Zeciri – Fredløs
- 2023: Frederik Cilius – Orkestret
- 2024: David Dencik – Prisoner
- 2025: Marco Ilsø – Bullshit
- 2026: Afshin Firouzi – The Asset
