= 36th Robert Awards =

201 Danish film awards ceremony

- Date: 3 February 2019
- Organized by: Danish Film Academy

Highlights
- Best Film: The Guilty
- Most awards: Film; The Guilty (7)
- Most nominations: Film; A Fortunate Man (16)

The 36th Robert Awards ceremony, presented by Danish Film Academy, took place on 3 February 2019 to honour the best in Danish film and television of 2019.

== Winners and nominees ==
The nominations were announced on 8 January 2019. Winners are listed first, highlighted in boldface, and indicated with a double dagger (‡)

=== Film ===
**Best Danish Film**: **The Guilty – Director: Gustav Möller; Script: Gustav Möller and Emil Nygaard Albertsen**‡; Ditte & Louise – Director: Niclas Bendixen; Script: Ditte Hansen and Louise Mieritz; The Purity of Vengeance – Director: Christoffer Boe; Script: Nikolaj Arcel, Bo Hr. Hansen and Mikkel Nørgaard; A Fortunate Man – Director: Bille August; Script: Bille August and Anders Frithiof August; The House That Jack Built – Director and Script: Lars von Trier	**Best Director**: **Gustav Möller – The Guilty**‡; Bille August – A Fortunate Man; Christoffer Boe – The Purity of Vengeance; Isabella Eklöf – Holiday; Lars von Trier – The House That Jack Built
**Best Actor in a Leading Role**: **Jakob Cedergren – The Guilty as Asger Holm**‡; Baard Owe – Christian IV – Den sidste rejse as Den eldre Christian IV; Esben Smed – A Fortunate Man as Peter Andreas Sidenius; Matt Dillon – The House That Jack Built as Jack; Rasmus Bjerg – Så længe jeg lever as John Mogensen	**Best Actress in a Leading Role**: **Katrine Greis-Rosenthal – A Fortunate Man as Jakobe Salomon**‡; Ditte Hansen – Ditte & Louise as Ditte; Louise Mieritz – Ditte & Louise as Louise; Paprika Steen – That Time of Year as Katrine; Victoria Carmen Sonne – Holiday as Sascha
**Best Actor in a Supporting Role**: **Fares Fares – The Purity of Vengeance as Assad**‡; Adam Brix – Ditte & Louise as David; Anders W. Berthelsen – Ditte & Louise as Anders; Benjamin Kitter – A Fortunate Man as Ivan Salomon; Jacob Lohmann – That Time of Year as Mads	**Best Actress in a Leading Role**: **Jessica Dinnage – The Guilty as Iben**‡; Fanny Bornedal – The Purity of Vengeance as Young Nete; Julie Christiansen – A Fortunate Man as Nanny Salomon; Karen-Lise Mynster – That Time of Year as Gunna; Sofie Gråbøl – That Time of Year as Barbara
**Best Children's Film**: **Checkered Ninja – Directors: Thorbjørn Christoffersen and Anders Matthesen; Script: Anders Matthesen**‡; Brakland – Director: Martin Skovbjerg; Script: Christian Gamst Miller-Harris; Landet af glas – Directors: Jeppe Vig Find and Marie Dalsgaard Rønn; Script: Marie Dalsgaard Rønn and Jeppe Vig Find; Vildheks – Director: Kaspar Munk; Script: Poul Berg, Bo hr. Hansen and Kaspar Munk; Vitello – Director: Dorte Bengtson; Script: Dorte Bengtson and Kim Fupz Aakeson	**Best Screenplay**: **The Guilty – Gustav Möller and Emil Nygaard Albertsen**‡; That Time of Year – Jakob Weis; Ditte & Louise – Ditte Hansen and Louise Mieritz; Holiday – Johanne Algren and Isabella Eklöf; The House That Jack Built – Lars von Trier
**Best Production Design**: **A Fortunate Man – Jette Lehmann**‡; Holiday – Josephine Farsø; Vildheks – Sabine Hviid; The House That Jack Built – Simone Grau Roney; Ditte & Louise – Søren Gam	**Best Cinematography**: **The House That Jack Built – Manuel Alberto Claro**‡; A Fortunate Man – Dirk Brüel; The Purity of Vengeance – Jacob Møller; The Guilty – Jasper Spanning; Holiday – Nadim Carlsen
**Best Costume Design**: **A Fortunate Man – Manon Rasmussen**‡; Så længe jeg lever – Charlotte Moe; The House That Jack Built – Manon Rasmussen; The Purity of Vengeance – Pernille Holm and Emilie Bøge Dresle; That Time of Year – Stine Gudmundsen-Holmgreen	**Best Makeup**: **Ditte & Louise – Sofie de Mylius**‡; Så længe jeg lever – Bjørg Serup; Christian IV – Den sidste rejse – Cecilie Do; The House That Jack Built – Dennis Knudsen; A Fortunate Man – Dennis Knudsen and Tina Helmark
**Best Editing**: **The Guilty – Carla Luffe**‡; A Fortunate Man – Anne Østerud and Janus Billeskov Jansen; The House That Jack Built – Molly Malene Stensgaard and Jacob Schulsinger; The Purity of Vengeance – My Thordal and Janus Billeskov Jansen; Holiday – Olivia Neergaard-Holm	**Best Sound Design**: **The Guilty – Oskar Skriver**‡; The House That Jack Built – Kristian Eidnes Andersen; The Purity of Vengeance – Morten Green and Eddie Simonsen; A Fortunate Man – Niels Arild and Kim Dalum; Checkered Ninja – Oskar Skriver and Bo Asdal
**Best Score**: **Brakland – Av Av Av**‡; Vildheks – Flemming Nordkrog; Ditte & Louise – Jomi Massage; Julenissens datter – Kristian Eidnes Andersen and Nicklas Schmidt; A Fortunate Man – Lorenz Dangel; The Purity of Vengeance – Mikkel Maltha and Anthony Lledo	**Best Song**: **"Skubber det sne" from Checkered Ninja – Music and Lyric: Anders Matthesen and #KewanLiggerBeatetNorma; Performer: Anders Matthesen**‡; "Sut min klit" from Ditte & Louise – Music and Lyric: Nikoline; Performer: Nikoline; "Under sole" from Iqbal & Den Indiske Juvel – Music and Lyric: Wafande, Søren Schou and Andreas Keilgaard; Performer: Wafande, Søren Schou and Andreas Keilgaar; "Vild" from Vildheks – Music and Lyric: Jenny Rossander, Lasse Lyngbo, Mads Møller and Thor Nørgaard; Performer: Jenny Rossander; "Vitello" from Vitello – Music and Lyric: Peter Sommer, Jøden and DJ Static; Performer: Peter Sommer, Jøden and DJ Static
**Best Visual Effects**: **The House That Jack Built – Peter Hjorth**‡; Iqbal & Den Indiske Juvel – Jonas Ussing and Martin Madsen; A Fortunate Man – Martin Madsen and Thomas Øhlenschlæger; Vildheks – Simon Sandin, Christian Sjöstedt and Christina Jæger; I Krig & Kærlighed – Toke Rude Trangbæk, Daniel French and Sammy Larsen	**Best Short Fiction/Animation**: **Maja – Director: Marijana Jankovic**‡; Dolphin – Director: Lauritz Munch-Petersen; Fugle – Director: Trine Nadia; November – Director: Kasper Møller Jensen; Næste stop – Director: Daniel Kragh-Jacobsen
**Best Documentary Short**: **Vi lader billedet stå et øjeblik – Director: Esther Wellejus**‡; Enten Eller – Director: Thora Lorentzen; Fantasi Fantasi – Director: Kaspar Astrup Schröder; Hjemsøgelsen – Director: Christian Einshøj; Vidne – Director: Louise Leth	**Best Documentary Feature**: **The Distant Barking of Dogs – Director: Simon Lereng Wilmont**‡; Bobbi Jene – Director: Elvira Lind; Den nat vi faldt – Director: Cille Hannibal

=== Television ===
**Best Danish Television Series**: **Herrens Veje – Writer: Adam Price; Director: Kaspar Munk**‡; The Bridge – Writers: Camilla Ahlgren and Hans Rosenfeldt; Director: Henrik Georgsson; Warrior – Writers: Christoffer Boe and Simon Pasternak; Director: Christoffer Boe; Liberty – Writer: Asger Leth; Director: Mikael Marcimain; The Rain – Writer: Jannik Tai Mosholt; Director: Kenneth Kainz	**Best Short Television Series**: **Doggystyle – Director: Anna Emma Haudal; Writer: Anna Emma Haudal**‡; 31 – Writers: Jesper Zuschlag and Julie Rudbæk; Directors: Jesper Zuschlag and Julie Rudbæk; En fremmed flytter ind – Writers: Krister Moltzen and Nicole N. Horanyi; Director: Nicole N. Horanyi; Theo & Den Magiske Talisman – Writers: Peter Gornstein and Trine Piil; Director: Peter Gornstein; Vitello – Writers: Dorte Bengtson and Kim Fupz Aakeson; Director: Dorte Bengtson
**Best Actor**: **Lars Mikkelsen as Johannes on Herrens Veje**‡; Carsten Bjørnlund as Niels on Liberty; Dar Salim as CC on Warrior; Lars Ranthe as Erik Jørgensen on Friheden; Thure Lindhardt as Henrik Sabroe on The Bridge	**Best Actress**: **Ann Eleonora Jørgensen as Elisabeth on Herrens Veje**‡; Alba August as Simone Andersen on The Rain; Danica Curcic as Louise on Warrior; Lene Maria Christensen as Nina on Friheden; Sofia Helin as Saga Norén on The Bridge
