= The Ib Award =

Danish film award

The Ib Award (Danish: Ib-prisen) is one of the external awards presented occasionally by the Danish Film Academy at the annual Robert Awards ceremony. The award was first handed out in 2013, and is named after Danish producer Ib Tardini.

== Honorees ==
- 2013: Ronnie Fridthjof
- 2015: Sigrid Dyekjær
- 2016: Signe Byrge Sørensen
- 2017: Jacob Jarek
- 2018: Katja Adomeit
- 2026: Trine Heidegaard
