= Robert Award for Best Actress in a Leading Television Role =

Danish Film Academy award

The Robert Award for Best Actress in a Leading Television Role (Danish: Robert Prisen for årets kvindelige hovedrolle – tv-serie) is one of the merit awards presented by the Danish Film Academy at the annual Robert Awards ceremony. The award has been handed out since 2013.

== Honorees ==
=== 2010s ===
- 2013: Sofie Gråbøl – Forbrydelsen 3
- 2014: Sofia Helin – Broen II
- 2015: Trine Dyrholm – The Legacy
- 2016: Trine Dyrholm – The Legacy
- 2017: Louise Mieritz – Ditte & Louise
- 2018: Ann Eleonora Jørgensen – Herrens Veje
- 2019: Ann Eleonora Jørgensen – Herrens Veje

=== 2020s ===
- 2020: Maria Rich – Bedrag
- 2021: Flora Ofelia – Ulven kommer
- 2022: Danica Curcic – The Chestnut Man
- 2023: Maria Rossing – Carmen Curlers
- 2024: Sofie Gråbøl – Prisoner
- 2025: Alba August – Bullshit
- 2026: Clara Dessau – The Asset
