= Marie Bach Hansen =

Danish actress (born 1985)

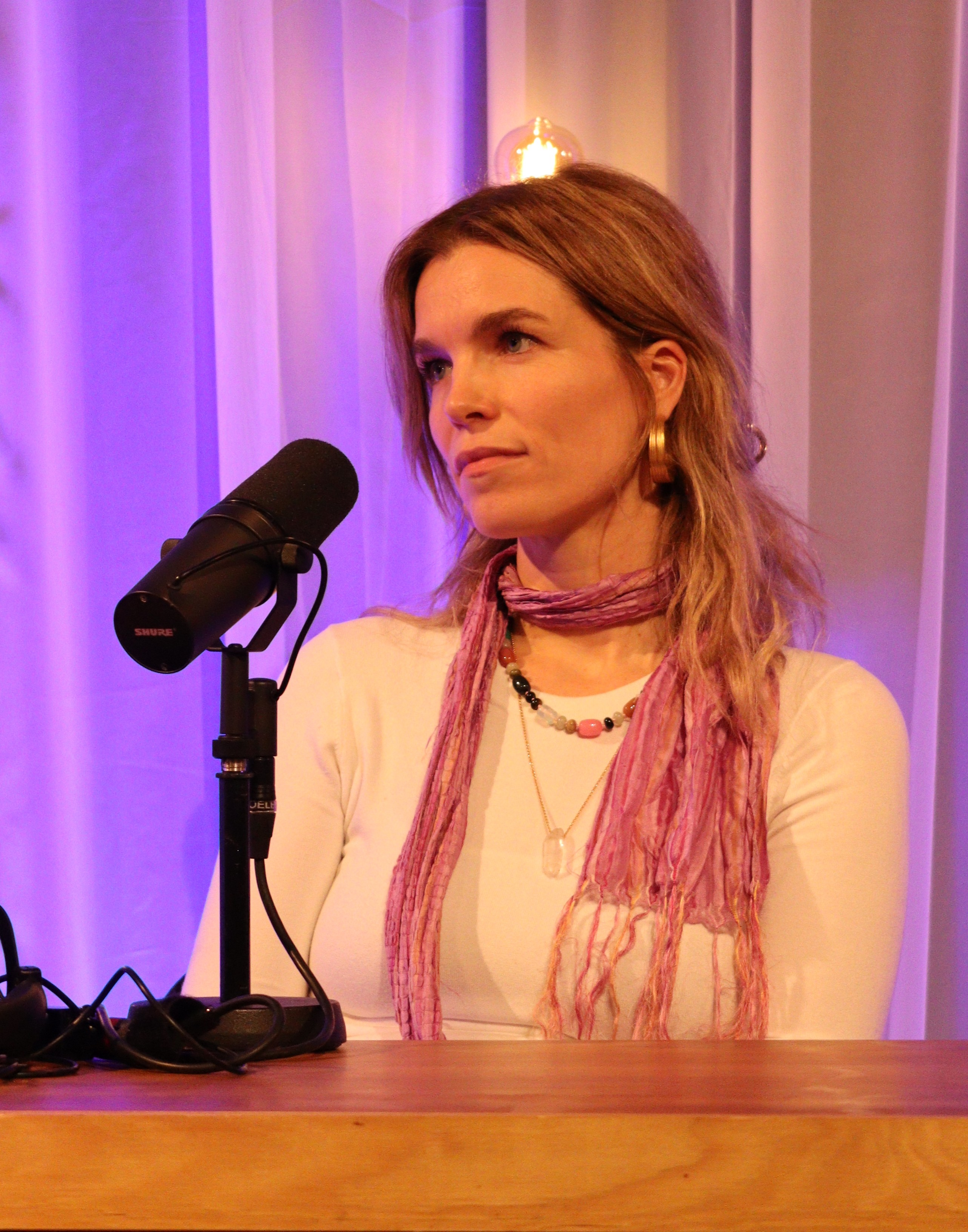
- Bach Hansen in 2023
- Born: 28 June 1985 (age 40); Borum, Aarhus Municipality, Denmark
- Education: Danish National School of Performing Arts
- Occupation: Actress
- Years active: 2003–present
- Partner: Stefan Pasborg

Marie Bach Hansen (born 28 June 1985) is a Danish actress.

== Early life ==
Bach Hansen was born in Borum, a small village in Aarhus Municipality, to a teacher mother and a carpenter father. She has a younger sister. She graduated from Aarhus Katedralskole. She later attended Musikalsk Grundkursus with the intent of pursuing music as a career, but dropped out to move to Barcelona, where she worked as a model and waitress for a year. She later moved back to Denmark, settling in Copenhagen, and graduated from the Danish National School of Performing Arts in 2010.

== Career ==
While in high school at Aarhus Katedralskole, Bach Hansen was approached by director Aage Rais, who cast her in the film Kick'n Rush (2003). Later, after completing drama school, she began acting at Mungo Park in Allerød Municipality. Her breakthrough role came in 2014, starring in the DR television series The Legacy until 2017. In 2018, she starred in the second season of the crime drama television series The Team. She competed on the Season 16 of Vild med dans, the Danish version of Strictly Come Dancing, in 2019, but was eliminated in the second week of the competition.

She began acting at the Royal Danish Theatre in 2023. In 2025, she starred as Cecilie in the Netflix miniseries Secrets We Keep, a role which earned her a Robert Award nomination for Best Actress in a Leading Television Role.

== Personal life ==
Bach Hansen has been in a relationship with drummer Stefan Pasborg since 2017.

== Filmography ==
=== Film ===
| Year | Title | Role | Notes | Ref. |
|---|---|---|---|---|
| 2003 | Kick'n Rush | Mathilde | | |
| 2010 | Klown | Medina's friend | | |
| 2011 | Rebounce | Pink Pige | | |
| 2012 | This Life | Tulle Fiil | | |
| 2019 | The Last Vermeer | Leez | | |
| 2019 | En flirt | Eva | Short film | |
| 2022 | Hvidstengruppen – de efterladte | Tulle Fiil | | |
| 2023 | Superposition | Stine | | |
| 2023 | Borderline | Anna | | |

=== Television ===
| Year | Title | Role | Notes | Ref. |
|---|---|---|---|---|
| 2013 | Borgen | Teacher | Episode: "Their Loss…" | |
| 2014–2017 | The Legacy | Signe Larsen | 26 episodes | |
| 2018 | The Team | Nelly Winther | 8 episodes | |
| 2021 | White Sands | Helene Falck | 8 episodes | |
| 2023 | Chorus Girls | Sussie | 8 episodes | |
| 2025 | Secrets We Keep | Cecilie | 6 episodes | |

== Awards and nominations ==
| Award | Year | Category | Nominated work | Result | Ref. |
|---|---|---|---|---|---|
| Robert Awards | 2024 | Best Actress in a Leading Television Role | Chorus Girls | Nominated | |
| Robert Awards | 2026 | Best Actress in a Leading Television Role | Secrets We Keep | Nominated | |
