= 32nd Robert Awards =

2015 Danish film awards ceremony

- Date: 1 February 2015
- Site: Tivoli Hotel & Congress Centre
- Hosted by: Lars Hjortshøj
- Organized by: Danish Film Academy

Highlights
- Best Film: Nymphomaniac Director's Cut
- Best Direction: Lars von Trier; Nymphomaniac Director's Cut
- Best Actor: Henrik Birch; The Sunfish
- Best Actress: Bodil Jørgensen; All Inclusive
- Most awards: Nymphomaniac Director's Cut (8)
- Most nominations: Nymphomaniac Director's Cut (16)

The 32nd Robert Awards ceremony was held on 1 February 2015 in Tivoli Hotel & Congress Centre in Copenhagen, Denmark. Organized by the Danish Film Academy, the awards honoured the best in Danish and foreign film of 2014.

== Honorees ==
=== Best Danish Film ===
- Nymphomaniac Director's Cut – Lars von Trier

=== Best Children's Film ===
- Antboy: Revenge of the Red Fury – Ask Hasselbalch

=== Best Director ===
- Lars von Trier – Nymphomaniac Director's Cut

=== Best Screenplay ===
- Lars von Trier – Nymphomaniac Director's Cut (Best original screenplay)
- Lærke Sanderhoff & Søren Balle – The Sunfish (Best adapted script)

=== Best Actor in a Leading Role ===
- Henrik Birch – The Sunfish

=== Best Actress in a Leading Role ===
- Bodil Jørgensen – All Inclusive

=== Best Actor in a Supporting Role ===
- Fares Fares – The Absent One (2014 film)

=== Best Actress in a Supporting Role ===
- Danica Curcic – Silent Heart

=== Best Production Design ===
- Sabine Hviid – When Animals Dream

=== Best Cinematography ===
- Manuel Alberto Claro – Nymphomaniac Director's Cut

=== Best Costume Design ===
- Manon Rasmussen – Nymphomaniac Director's Cut

=== Best Makeup ===
- Louise Hauberg Lohmann, Thomas Foldberg & Morten Jacobsen – When Animals Dream

=== Best Editing ===
- Molly Malene Stensgaard & Morten Højbjerg – Nymphomaniac Director's Cut

=== Best Sound Design ===
- Kristian Eidnes Andersen – Nymphomaniac Director's Cut

=== Best Score ===
- Tina Dickow & Marie Fisker – En du elsker

=== Visual Effects ===
- Peter Hjorth – Nymphomaniac Director's Cut

=== Best Short Fiction/Animation ===
- Helium – Anders Walter

=== Best Long Fiction/Animation ===
- Lulu – Caroline Sascha Cogez

=== Best Documentary Short ===
- Mig og min far – Hvem fanden gider klappe? – Kathrine Ravn Kruse

=== Best Documentary Feature ===
- The Look of Silence – Joshua Oppenheimer

=== Best Short Television Series ===
- Tidsrejsen – Kaspar Munk

=== Best Danish Television Series ===
- The Legacy – Pernilla August

=== Best Actress in a Leading Television Role ===
- Trine Dyrholm – The Legacy

=== Best Actor in a Leading Television Role ===
- Carsten Bjørnlund – The Legacy

=== Best Actress in a Supporting Television Role ===
- Lene Maria Christensen – The Legacy

=== Best Actor in a Supporting Television Role ===
- Mikkel Boe Følsgaard – The Legacy

=== Best American Film ===
- Boyhood – Richard Linklater

=== Best Non-American Film ===
- Force Majeure – Ruben Östlund

=== Honorary Award ===
- Christel Hammer

=== The Ib Award ===
- Sigrid Dyekjær

=== Audience Award ===
- The Absent One (2014 film) – as "Blockbuster Publikumsprisen"

== See also ==
- 2015 Bodil Awards
