= The Legacy (TV series) =

- Title card
- Also known as: Arvingerne
- Created by: Maya Ilsøe
- Written by: Maya Ilsøe; Maja Jul Larsen; Anders August; Lolita Belstar; Karina Dam; Per Daumiller; Lasse Kyed Rasmussen
- Directed by: Pernilla August; Louise Friedberg; Jesper Christensen; Heidi Maria Faisst
- Starring: Trine Dyrholm; Jesper Christensen; Marie Bach Hansen; Carsten Bjørnlund; Mikkel Boe Følsgaard
- Country of origin: Denmark
- Original language: Danish
- No. of seasons: 3
- No. of episodes: 26

Production
- Running time: 1 hour

Original release
- Network: DR
- Release: 1 January 2014 – 26 February 2017

The Legacy (Danish: Arvingerne, lit. 'The Heirs') is a Danish television drama series created by Maya Ilsøe and produced by DR, starring Trine Dyrholm, Carsten Bjørnlund, Marie Bach Hansen, and Mikkel Boe Følsgaard. The series is a family drama, telling the story of four siblings trying to cope with the fallout from their mother's death, which has turned all of their lives upside down.

The first season, consisting of ten episodes, premiered on DR1 on 1 January 2014. The second season of seven episodes aired from 1 January 2015, and the third season of nine episodes began on 1 January 2017. The series won several awards, and was sold to over 40 countries.

== Synopsis ==
The Legacy starts out at the legendary manor Grønnegaard on southern Funen, where the internationally renowned artist Veronika Grønnegaard has lived an eccentric and colourful life since the wild sixties. The series follows Veronika's four adult children, whose free and chaotic childhood at Grønnegaard has left its mark on them in very different ways. They live scattered around the country (and Emil, out of it, in Thailand), until Veronika unexpectedly dies and they are forced to gather to wind up the estate. Just before she dies, Veronika leaves the manor to her daughter Signe, who was given up for adoption. Signe lives with her partner in a quiet residential area in the local town and had not previously known the truth of her parentage, although her adoptive parents, the Larsens, did know. Each of the children had different relationships with the matriarch, and each also have complications in their own lives.

The second season of The Legacy begins one year after the events of the first. The third season begins three years after the events of season two.

== Cast ==
Character	Season 1 (2014)	Season 2 (2015)	Season 3 (2017)
Gro Grønnegaard	Trine Dyrholm	Trine Dyrholm	Trine Dyrholm
Frederik Grønnegaard	Carsten Bjørnlund	Carsten Bjørnlund	Carsten Bjørnlund
Emil Grønnegaard	Mikkel Boe Følsgaard	Mikkel Boe Følsgaard	Mikkel Boe Følsgaard
Signe Larsen	Marie Bach Hansen	Marie Bach Hansen	Marie Bach Hansen
Veronika Grønnegaard	Kirsten Olesen		
Thomas Konrad	Jesper Christensen	Jesper Christensen	
Lone Ramsbøll	Kirsten Lehfeldt	Kirsten Lehfeldt	Kirsten Lehfeldt
Solveig Riis Grønnegaard	Lene Maria Christensen	Lene Maria Christensen	Lene Maria Christensen
Robert Eliassen	Trond Espen Seim	Trond Espen Seim	Trond Espen Seim
John Larsen	Jens Jørn Spottag	Jens Jørn Spottag	Jens Jørn Spottag
Lise Larsen	Annette Katzmann	Annette Katzmann	Annette Katzmann
Hannah Grønnegaard	Karla Løkke	Karla Løkke	Karla Løkke
Villads Grønnegaard	Victor Stoltenberg Nielsen	Victor Stoltenberg Nielsen	Victor Stoltenberg Nielsen
Melody		Naya Beck	Smilla Hougaard
Isa Varlø	Josephine Park	Josephine Park	

== Production and themes ==
According to Trine Dyrholm, one of the series' themes is the legacy of "the 1968 generation".

Before filming the third season, Dyrholm said, "The second season is kind of the aftermath of the war – the war within the family – a new order has been established. The first season was about where you come from, and the second season is how you live with that, and the third season should be something about what kind of imprint you leave".

== Release ==
The first season of The Legacy aired on DR1 from 1 January 2014. It was sold to a number of other countries worldwide before its Denmark premiere.

Screening rights were sold to over 40 countries, including:

- United Kingdom: Sky Arts in November 2014; released as a box set of DVDs in 2015
- Australia: SBS Television from 15 April 2015
- United States: Released first on DVD in April 2015; broadcast on MHz Worldview over five consecutive evenings in June 2015

Following the success of the first season, a second season consisting of seven episodes began airing on Danish television on 1 January 2015. In the UK, the second season began airing on 12 June 2015, and in Australia on 30 August 2016.

The third and final season aired weekly from 1 January to 26 February 2017 on DR1.

== Reception ==
The first season reached nearly 2 million viewers in Denmark, of a population of 5.6 million.

In July 2014, the rights were sold to Universal Cable Productions, the production arm of NBCUniversal Media Group, who planned to develop an American version with Hypnotic. At that point, the original had not been screened in the US.

=== Critical reception ===
Gerard Gilbert, writing for The Independent, called the first season "one of the best TV dramas of the past year or so".

Kylie Northover of The Sydney Morning Herald praised the acting and described the series as "beautifully, moodily filmed". Another Australian reviewer, writing for The Toowoomba Chronicle, called it "the best new series on TV this year.... just superior TV. It's well acted, sophisticated, oddly claustrophobic and compelling".

Rebecca Rose, writing for the Financial Times after discovering the series during the COVID-19 pandemic, described it as "the Danish successor to Succession", the American series that aired from 2018, and praised its writing and characterisation.

== Accolades ==
Award	Year	Category	Nominee	Result	Ref.
Bodil Awards	2016	Kathrine Windfeld Memorial Fund	Maya Ilsøe, Pernilla August, and Trine Dyrholm	Won	
Golden FIPA	2014	Best TV Series	The Legacy	Won	
Golden FIPA	2014	Best Screenplay	The Legacy	Won	
Robert Awards	2015	Best Danish Television Series	The Legacy	Won	
Robert Awards	2015	Best Actor in a Leading Television Role	Carsten Bjørnlund	Won	
Robert Awards	2015	Best Actress in a Leading Television Role	Trine Dyrholm	Won	
Robert Awards	2015	Best Actor in a Supporting Television Role	Jesper Christensen	Nominated	
Robert Awards	2015	Best Actor in a Supporting Television Role	Mikkel Boe Følsgaard	Won	
Robert Awards	2015	Best Actress in a Supporting Television Role	Lene Maria Christensen	Won	
Robert Awards	2016	Best Danish Television Series	The Legacy	Won	
Robert Awards	2016	Best Actor in a Leading Television Role	Carsten Bjørnlund	Won	
Robert Awards	2016	Best Actress in a Leading Television Role	Trine Dyrholm	Won	
Robert Awards	2016	Best Actor in a Supporting Television Role	Jesper Christensen	Won	
Robert Awards	2016	Best Actress in a Supporting Television Role	Lene Maria Christensen	Won	
Robert Awards	2018	Best Danish Television Series	The Legacy	Nominated	
Robert Awards	2018	Best Actor in a Leading Television Role	Carsten Bjørnlund	Nominated	
Robert Awards	2018	Best Actress in a Leading Television Role	Trine Dyrholm	Nominated	
Robert Awards	2018	Best Actor in a Supporting Television Role	Mikkel Boe Følsgaard	Won	
Robert Awards	2018	Best Actress in a Supporting Television Role	Lene Maria Christensen	Won	
TV Prisen	2014	Best TV Drama	The Legacy	Won	
TV Prisen	2014	Viewers Award	The Legacy	Won	
