= Nymphomaniac (film) =

2013 two-part film by Lars von Trier

- Film poster
- Directed by: Lars von Trier
- Written by: Lars von Trier
- Produced by: Marie Cecilie Gade; Louise Vesth
- Starring: Charlotte Gainsbourg; Stellan Skarsgård; Stacy Martin; Shia LaBeouf; Christian Slater; Jamie Bell; Uma Thurman; Willem Dafoe; Mia Goth; Sophie Kennedy Clark; Connie Nielsen; Michaël Pas; Jean-Marc Barr; Udo Kier
- Cinematography: Manuel Alberto Claro
- Edited by: Volume I: Morten Højbjerg; Both volumes: Molly Marlene Stensgaard
- Production companies: Zentropa Entertainments; Slot Machine; Caviar Films; Zenbelgie; Arte France Cinéma; Film i Väst; Arte GEIE; Danish Film Institute; Film- und Medienstiftung NRW; Eurimages; Deutscher Filmföderfonds; Centre National du Cinéma et de l'Image Animée; Swedish Film Institute; Flanders Audiovisual Fund; DR; Nordisk Film; Canal+; Den Vestdanske Filmpulje; Ciné+; Heimatfilm
- Distributed by: Nordisk Film (Denmark); Les Films du Losange (France); Concorde Filmverleih (Germany); ABC Distribution (Belgium)
- Release dates: 25 December 2013 (Denmark); 1 January 2014 (Belgium and France); 20 February 2014 (Germany)
- Running time: Volume I: 117 minutes; 145 minutes (Director's Cut); Volume II: 124 minutes; 180 minutes (Director's Cut); Both volumes: 241 minutes; 325 minutes (Director's Cut)
- Countries: Denmark; Germany; France; Belgium
- Language: English
- Budget: $4.7 million
- Box office: Volume I: $13.6 million; Volume II: $4.9 million; Both volumes: $18.5 million

Nymphomaniac (stylized as NYMPH()MANIAC onscreen and in advertising, and sometimes as NYMPH(;)MANIAC) is a 2013 erotic drama art film written and directed by Lars von Trier. The film stars Charlotte Gainsbourg, Stellan Skarsgård, Stacy Martin, Shia LaBeouf, Christian Slater, Jamie Bell, Uma Thurman, Jean-Marc Barr, Willem Dafoe, Connie Nielsen, and Mia Goth; both Martin and Goth appeared in their film debut. Separated into two films, the plot follows Joe (played by Gainsbourg and Martin), a self-diagnosed "nymphomaniac" who recounts her erotic experiences to a bachelor who helps her recover from an assault. The narrative chronicles Joe's promiscuous life from adolescence to adulthood and is split into eight chapters told across two volumes. The film was originally supposed to be only one complete entry, but, because of its length, von Trier made the decision to split the project into two separate films. Nymphomaniac was an international co-production of Denmark, Belgium, France, and Germany.

The world premiere of the uncut Volume I occurred on 16 February 2014 at the 64th Berlin International Film Festival, while the uncut Volume II premiered at the 71st Venice International Film Festival. The world premiere of the Director's Cut took place in Copenhagen on 10 September 2014. It was nominated for the 2014 Nordic Council Film Prize.

Nymphomaniac is the third and final installment in von Trier's unofficially titled Depression Trilogy, following Antichrist and Melancholia.

== Plot ==
Highly educated but cloistered middle-aged bachelor Seligman finds nymphomaniac Joe beaten up and lying in the alleyway behind his apartment. He takes her to his home and listens as Joe recounts the story of her libidinous life. Seligman parallels much of what she has experienced with various methods of fly fishing, his favorite sport.

=== Volume I ===
Joe is raised by a loving father and detached mother. In adolescence, she loses her virginity to neighbor Jerôme, who then leaves her to fix his moped. Seligman notes that Jerôme penetrated her three times vaginally and five anally, resembling the Fibonacci sequence.

Years later, Joe and her friend B engage in a contest to see who can have sex with the most passengers on a train before its arrival, the winner receiving a bag of chocolate. Joe wins after fellating S, a married passenger who resists both girls' advances until Joe forces herself on him and orally rapes him.

Joe relays her first experiences with actual love, which she calls "lust with jealousy added". She and her friends establish a club, "The Little Flock", dedicated to freely having sex in an effort to reject society's fixation on love. Joe leaves after all the other members develop serious attachments to their conquests. As a young adult, Joe drops out of medical school and finds work as a secretary at a printing company. Her first employer is Jerôme. She avoids his advances in favor of sleeping with other co-workers, to his consternation. Joe writes Jerôme a letter after realizing her feelings for him, but realizes he has left with the jealous secretary, Liz. She is immediately fired by Jerôme's uncle, the owner of the company, and goes back to indulging her nymphomania despite yearning for Jerôme.

While Joe is with one of her lovers, H, his wife arrives and admonishes them in front of their children, which the present-day Joe admits barely affected her. Another lover, A, arrives in the middle of Mrs. H's breakdown. The family eventually leaves, after Mrs. H verbally attacks Joe, slaps H, and flees the apartment, wailing.

A conversation about Edgar Allan Poe's death reminds Joe of the last time she saw her father; she is the only one to visit him in the hospital as he dies of cancer. Joe watches her father experience violent spasms and paranoid delusions, screaming for his wife. To distract herself, Joe has intercourse with several people at the hospital. When he finally dies, Joe becomes aroused before becoming overwhelmed with depression.

After Seligman asserts that Bach perfected polyphony, Joe discusses the lovers leading up to her "cantus firmus" - F, a tender but predictable man who prioritizes Joe's sexual needs over his own, and G, whose animalistic control of Joe thrills her. While walking in a local park, Joe encounters Jerôme, who has left Liz. They embrace and engage in authentically passionate sex, but Joe is distraught when she can no longer "feel anything".

=== Volume II ===
Joe becomes annoyed with Seligman's focus on allegories, realizing he cannot relate to her experiences. He confirms his asexuality and virginity, but claims this makes him best equipped to listen to her story.

Joe reminisces about a vision she had as a young girl of Valeria Messalina and the Whore of Babylon looking over her as she levitates and spontaneously has her first orgasm, which Seligman calls a mockery of the Transfiguration of Jesus.

Joe suffers a crisis over her inability to achieve sexual pleasure, eventually having a baby, named Marcel, with Jerôme. Their relationship becomes further strained when Jerôme allows her to see other men.

Joe begins visiting K, a professional dominant who performs excessively sadistic BDSM acts on women seeking his company. At Christmas, after rescuing an unattended Marcel who has wandered onto a snowy balcony, Jerôme makes her choose between the family and herself. She chooses the latter, later receiving an especially brutal beating from K that makes her climax again. Marcel is sent to a foster home. Years later, Joe has regained pleasure, but her genitalia are irreversibly damaged. Her new boss, knowing of her habits, demands she attend sex addiction therapy.

Joe becomes pregnant and seeks an abortion, but the doctor insists she speak to a counselor first. When this ends disastrously, Joe performs the procedure herself with several household implements and a wire hanger. In the present, Joe and Seligman argue about abortion rights.

Joe reluctantly attends therapy and attempts sobriety. During one meeting, she sees her younger self in the mirror, insults the other group members, and proclaims pride in her nymphomania before leaving. Feeling ostracized from "normal" society, Joe becomes a debt collector. She reminisces about a house call to a man she initially finds sexually unreadable. She ties him to a chair, strips him, and provokes him, ultimately gleaning that he is a repressed paedophile and fellating him. She explains to Seligman that she empathized with his status as a sexual outcast, and lauds him for never acting on his desires.

Joe's superior, L, suggests she groom P, the 15-year-old daughter of criminals. Joe is initially repulsed by the idea, but begins a sexual relationship with P after she turns 18, later inviting P to move in with her while hesitantly teaching P her job.

During one round of debt collection, Joe realizes they are at a house belonging to Jerôme and tells P to perform the job herself. After learning P is having an affair with Jerôme, Joe ambushes them in an alleyway and attempts to shoot them. Jerôme viciously beats Joe before having sex with P in front of her. P urinates on Joe before leaving.

In the present, Seligman suggests Joe's experiences were fueled by differences in gender representation; her guilt and shame made her fight "like a man", ultimately "forgetting" to rack the gun because her human worth forbade her to kill someone. Joe finally feels content, having unburdened her story to someone she truly considers a friend.

As she sleeps, Seligman attempts to rape Joe, but Joe wakes up and reaches for the gun. Seligman attempts to justify himself, but Joe shoots him and flees the apartment.

== Cast ==
Main cast

- Charlotte Gainsbourg as Joe (ages 35–50)
  - Stacy Martin as Young Joe (ages 15–31)
- Stellan Skarsgård as Seligman
- Shia LaBeouf as Jerôme Morris
- Christian Slater as Joe's Father
- Jamie Bell as K
- Uma Thurman as Mrs. H
- Willem Dafoe as L
- Mia Goth as P
- Sophie Kennedy Clark as B
- Connie Nielsen as Katherine (Joe's mother)
- Michaël Pas as Older Jerôme
- Jean-Marc Barr as The Debtor Gentleman
- Udo Kier as The Waiter

Vol. I cast

- Maja Arsovic as Joe (7 years)
- Sofie Kasten as B (10 years)
- Ananya Berg as Joe (10 years)
- James Northcote as Young Lad #1 on Train
- Charlie G. Hawkins as Young Lad #2 on Train
- Jens Albinus as S
- Felicity Gilbert as Liz, The Secretary
- Jesper Christensen as Jerôme's Uncle
- Hugo Speer as Mr. H
- Cyron Melville as Andy (A)
- Saskia Reeves as Nurse
- Nicolas Bro as F
- Christian Gade Bjerrum as G
- Anders Hove as Odin (extended version only)

Vol. II cast

- Shanti Roney as Tobias, The Interpreter
- Laura Christensen as Babysitter
- Caroline Goodall as Psychologist
- Kate Ashfield as Therapist
- Tania Carlin as Renée
- Daniela Lebang as Brunelda
- Omar Shargawi as Thug #1
- Marcus Jakovljevic as Thug #2
- Severin Von Hoensbroech as Debtor In Greenhouse

== Production ==
=== Pre-production ===
Executive producer and Zentropa co-founder Peter Aalbæk Jensen revealed that the film is to be two parts. "We are making two films. It is a big operation. I personally hope that we should be ready for Cannes next year. We will shoot both and edit both – and we want to finish both at the same time." He explained there will be two versions of each film: an explicit cut and a softer cut.

LaBeouf got his role in Nymphomaniac by sending a tape of himself having intercourse with his girlfriend Karolyn Pho to von Trier. Slater got connected to von Trier via his agent being in Denmark and used makeup under his eyes to make himself look old enough to be Joe's father.

LaBeouf said in August 2012, "The movie is what you think it is. It is Lars von Trier, making a movie about what he's making. For instance, there's a disclaimer at the top of the script that basically says we're doing it for real. Everything that is illegal, we'll shoot in blurred images. Other than that, everything is happening. ... [V]on Trier's dangerous. He scares me. And I'm only going to work now when I'm terrified."

=== Filming ===
Principal photography occurred between 28 August–9 November 2012 in Cologne and Hilden, Germany, and in Ghent, Belgium.

To produce scenes of simulated sex, von Trier used digital compositing to superimpose the genitals of pornographic film actors onto the bodies of the film's actors. Producer Louise Vesth explained during the Cannes Film Festival:

We shot the actors pretending to have sex and then had the body doubles, who really did have sex, and in post we will digital impose the two. So above the waist it will be the star and the [sic] below the waist it will be the doubles.

Gainsbourg and Martin further revealed that prosthetic vaginas and closed sets were used during filming. Martin stated that her acting experience for the film was enjoyable and, after explaining that the film's characters are a reflection of the director himself, referred to the process as an "honour." Martin also stated that shooting the sex scenes was a bit boring due to their technical nature.

=== Music ===
A seven-track soundtrack was released digitally by Zentropa on 27 June 2014, containing a mix of classical and modern rock music, along with two sound clips from the prologue of the film.

No.	Title	Notes	Length
1.	"Prologue Part I"	by Kristian Eidnes Andersen	1:44
2.	"Führe mich"	bonus track from Rammstein's 2009 album Liebe ist für alle da	4:16
3.	"Sonata for Violin and Piano in A major"	arranged for cello (César Franck); by Henrik Dam Thomsen and Ulrich Staerk	7:05
4.	"Suite for Jazz Orchestra No. 2 (Shostakovich)"	by Dmitri Shostakovich; performed by Russian State Symphony Orchestra	1:10
5.	"Ich ruf zu dir, Herr Jesu Christ, BWV 639"	chorale prelude by Johann Sebastian Bach; performed by Mads Høck	2:59
6.	"Prologue Part II"	by Kristian Eidnes Andersen	2:27
7.	"Hey Joe"	performed by Charlotte Gainsbourg	4:39
Total length:			23:00

== Marketing ==
Theatrical release posters for Volume I and Volume II

In early 2013, the first teaser poster was released from the film's official website. Shortly thereafter, Zentropa released a promotional photo shoot featuring the film's main characters posing in suggestive positions and a list of the film's chapters. This was followed by the release of a picture of Trier himself with duct tape covering his mouth, accompanied by a press release explaining the official launch of the film's campaign.

An incremental marketing campaign was used to promote the film, as brief video segments, each described as an "appetizer" by the film's production company, were released online leading up to the film's release date. Each appetizer represented each of the eight chapters of Nymphomaniac and the first one, entitled "The Compleat Angler", appeared on 28 June 2013, the last Friday of the month—this pattern would be followed for the monthly release of the subsequent clips. Following "The Compleat Angler", "Jerôme" featuring Martin and LaBeouf, was released in August; "Mrs. H" in September; the predominantly black-and-white "Delirium" (containing a voice-over by Skarsgård) was released in October; in November, the appetizer for "The Little Organ School" was uploaded to YouTube, but was quickly removed due to its explicit content; "The Eastern and the Western Church" was released exclusively for Vimeo on 29 November; in December, the appetizer for "The Mirror" was released, again on Vimeo; and on 25 December, leading into the European release of the film, "The Gun" was released on the film's official website.

In October 2013, a series of posters were released, each depicting the film's characters during the moment of orgasm. Along with the appetizers and the character posters, five theatrical posters (three for the complete feature and one for each volume) and an international trailer featuring some of the explicit sexual scenes, were released.

In July 2014, Zentropa revealed the poster for the Director's Cut when announcing its premiere at the Venice Film Festival. The poster combined the original teaser with Lars von Trier standing in between the two parentheses.

=== Rating ===
Nymphomaniac initially received an NC-17 from the Motion Picture Association of America in early 2014. The film, however, surrendered the rating and was released without any MPAA rating.

== Release ==
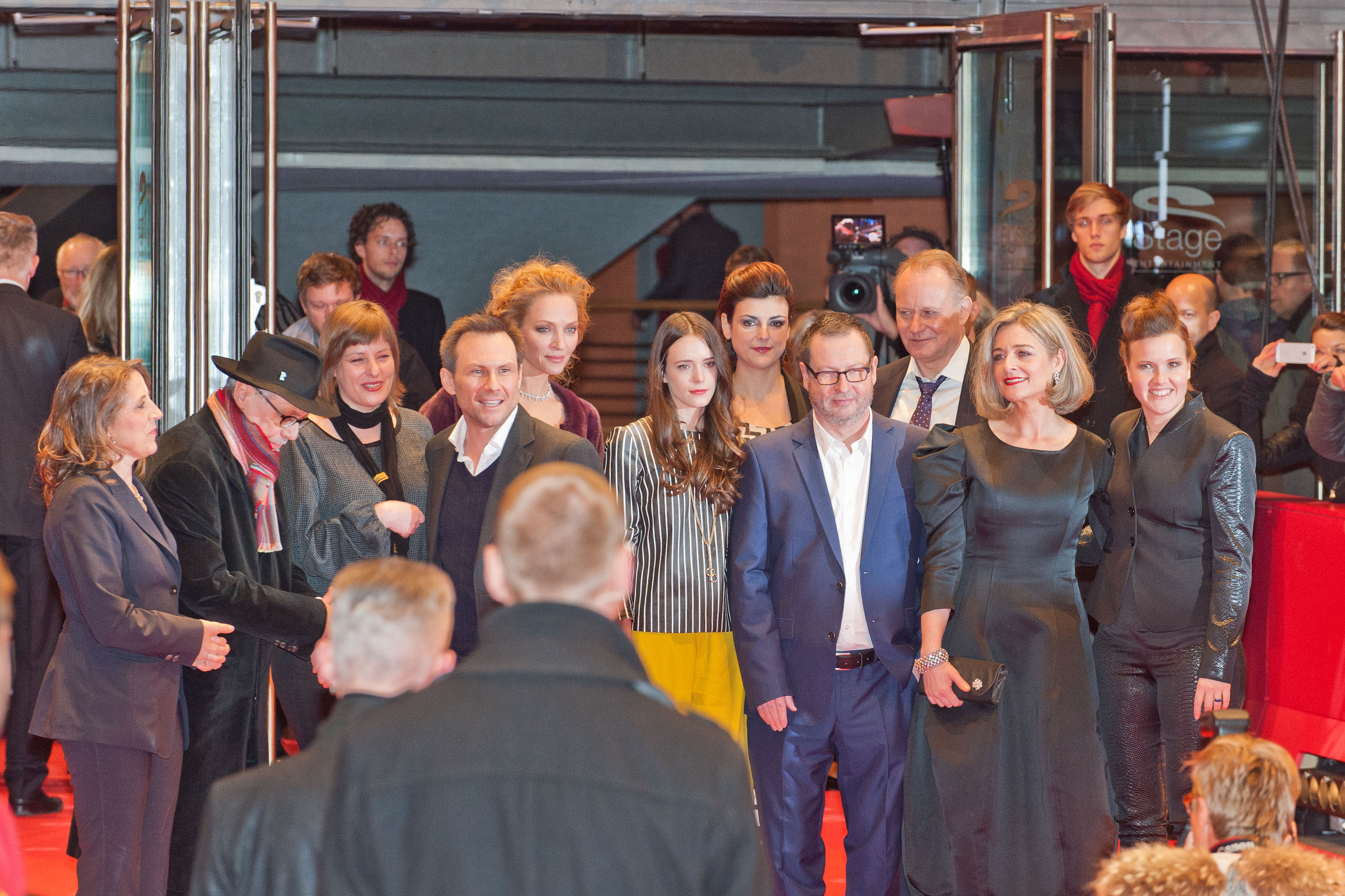
Cast and crew of the film at the 64th Berlin International Film Festival

Von Trier's complete five-and-a-half-hour version was released in few territories and only long after the original premiere. Instead, a four-hour version was edited without the director's involvement and has been used for the film's international release, divided into two volumes – Volume I and Volume II – with ninety minutes removed.

Lars von Trier's upcoming NYMPHOMANIAC is distributed in two parts (Volume I and II) and two versions (one lasting four hours in total, one in five and a half hours in total). From 25 December 2013, and approximately four months ahead, the four-hour long NYMPHOMANIAC Volume I and II is released worldwide. In some territories the two volumes will be released at the same time, and in some territories the volumes will be released apart. Each country has its own rules of censorship and in order to create cohesion between each country's distribution strategies the four-hour long version will be the one released first. And even this version is expected to meet minor additional changes in certain countries. Just as Lars von Trier gave consent to the making of different censored versions of ANTICHRIST, when that film was released, Trier has also approved of this version of NYMPHOMANIAC. Technically the changes in the abridged version consist of an editing-out of the most explicit close-ups of genitals and the film has, in agreement with Lars von Trier, been shortened by his editors to a length, which has been decided upon in collaboration with several of the film's stakeholders, two parts of two hours each. The five-and-a-half-hour long version of NYMPHOMANIAC Volume I and II expect to be finalized for distribution sometime in 2014. When, exactly, is to be confirmed. This version will be distributed in those parts of the world where laws of censorship allow. Ever since NYMPHOMANIAC was announced as Lars von Trier's next project it's been out in the open that the film would be distributed in different versions, ensuring financing, and as widespread distribution of NYMPHOMANIAC as possible, and finally to ensure Lars von Trier as much artistic freedom as possible.

— Producer Louise Vesth, November 2013, quoted from Nymphomaniac International Press Materials

We knew from the beginning that there would be various versions. But we didn't really work with that. We worked with one film, and that's the film that is Lars' version, the Director's Cut. Then, after we'd worked with that for eight months, we used a month to do the shorter version. So it wasn't really like trying to do different versions at once. We just did one film – a film that we really liked. A long film with a break, basically. – Editor Molly Malene Stensgaard, quoted from the 2014 Venice Festival issue of ''DFI-Film''

A "secret" advance screening of Volume I occurred at the Sundance Film Festival on 21 January 2014, at the Egyptian Theater with tickets distributed bearing the film title "Film X" amidst rumors the film could either be von Trier's film, or Wes Anderson's The Grand Budapest Hotel. The film's UK premiere took place on 22 February 2014. In the United States, the film was also released in two parts, billed as Nymphomaniac: Volume I and Nymphomaniac: Volume II, but on separate dates: 21 March 2014 and 4 April 2014.

In Australia and New Zealand, the four-hour version of the film was distributed by the Transmission Films company. Released on 20 March 2014, the two volumes were shown back-to-back with an interval.

In February 2014, the uncut Volume I was screened at the Berlin Film Festival. In September 2014, the uncut version of Volume I and Volume II was screened at the Venice Film Festival. The complete Director's Cut, including both volumes, was finally released to a general audience in Copenhagen, Denmark, premiering on 10 September 2014, where it was shown with a half-hour intermission at a red carpet gala screening with von Trier present in the audience; at this premiere, during the film's restored abortion sequence, where Joe performs an abortion on herself, three male audience members fainted and had to be carried out of the cinema.

== Reception ==
On Rotten Tomatoes, Volume I achieved a 76% approval rating and an average rating of 6.9/10, based on 202 reviews; the website's critical consensus states: "Darkly funny, fearlessly bold, and thoroughly indulgent, Nymphomaniac finds Lars von Trier provoking viewers with customary abandon." Volume II received a 59% rating with an average of 6.4/10, based on 126 reviews; the consensus states: "It doesn't quite live up to the promise of the first installment, but Nymphomaniac: Volume II still benefits from Lars von Trier's singular craft and vision, as well as a bravura performance from Charlotte Gainsbourg." On Metacritic, the first volume holds a 64/100 rating based on 41 critics, and the second volume a 61/100 rating based on 34 critics, indicating "generally favorable reviews".

Michelle Orange of The Village Voice called it a "jigsaw opus, an extended and generally exquisitely crafted riff." In The Australian, David Stratton said that he "detested" some of Trier's films, and states that Nymphomaniac "seems designed to be his magnum opus, the film in which he gets to rail against everything he loathes about contemporary life and contemporary cinema." The modified version screened in Australia, officially referred to as the "international" version. Stratton further stated on the television review program At the Movies that he found the four-hour runtime of the film to be "daunting", but praised some of the performances, particularly those of Stacy Martin and Jamie Bell. Stratton's co-host Margaret Pomeranz meanwhile, while also praising the boldness of the performances, felt the film's unsimulated depictions of sex did not add to the narrative and as such had, "such an undercurrent of sadism that I was, not repelled, but distanced". Thought Catalog remarked on how the plot failed to be consistent or plausible.

Keith Uhlich of The A.V. Club named Nymphomaniac the third-best film of 2014.

On the Melbourne community radio station, 3RRR, film criticism program "Plato's Cave" praised von Trier's work on Nymphomaniac and presenters, Thomas Caldwell and Josh Nelson, defended the director against accusations of misogyny. Both presenters agreed that actresses who von Trier has worked with, such as Nicole Kidman and Björk, have delivered excellent performances in his films, while Nelson referred to Antichrist and Melancholia, the first two installments of the Depression Trilogy, as "masterpieces". Caldwell concludes the review by stating, "... if you're coming new to him [von Trier], I think this is a real crash course in all his preoccupations."

When the complete Director's Cut had its general release world premiere in Copenhagen on 10 September 2014, major Danish critics gave it high ratings. In spite of this, the Director's Cut sold only 3,494 tickets in Danish cinemas.

=== Accolades ===
Award ceremony	Category	Nominee(s)	Result
67th Bodil Awards	Best Danish Film	Lars von Trier	Nominated
67th Bodil Awards	Best Actress	Charlotte Gainsbourg	Won
67th Bodil Awards	Best Actress	Stacy Martin	Nominated
67th Bodil Awards	Best Actor	Stellan Skarsgård	Nominated
67th Bodil Awards	Best Supporting Actress	Uma Thurman	Nominated
67th Bodil Awards	Best Supporting Actor	Jamie Bell	Nominated
27th European Film Awards	Best Film	Lars von Trier	Nominated
27th European Film Awards	Best Actress	Charlotte Gainsbourg	Nominated
27th European Film Awards	Best Actor	Stellan Skarsgård	Nominated
27th European Film Awards	Audience Award for Best Film	Lars von Trier	Nominated
2015 Gopo Awards	Best European Film	Lars von Trier	Nominated
2015 Jupiter Awards	Best International Actress	Uma Thurman	Nominated
2014 Nordic Council	Nordic Council Film Prize	Lars von Trier	Nominated
2015 Polish Film Awards	Best European Film	Lars von Trier	Nominated
32nd Robert Awards	Best Danish Film	Lars von Trier	Won
32nd Robert Awards	Best Director	Lars von Trier	Won
32nd Robert Awards	Best Original Screenplay	Lars von Trier	Won
32nd Robert Awards	Best Actress	Charlotte Gainsbourg	Nominated
32nd Robert Awards	Best Actor	Stellan Skarsgård	Nominated
32nd Robert Awards	Best Supporting Actress	Stacy Martin	Nominated
32nd Robert Awards	Best Supporting Actress	Uma Thurman	Nominated
32nd Robert Awards	Best Supporting Actor	Jamie Bell	Nominated
32nd Robert Awards	Best Cinematography	Manuel Alberto Claro	Won
32nd Robert Awards	Best Costume Design	Manon Rasmussen	Won
32nd Robert Awards	Best Makeup	Dennis Knudsen, Morten Jacobsen and Thomas Foldberg	Nominated
32nd Robert Awards	Best Visual Effects	Peter Hjorth	Won
32nd Robert Awards	Best Sound Design	Kristian Eidnes Andersen	Won
32nd Robert Awards	Best Editing	Molly Malene Stensgaard and Morten Højbjerg	Won
32nd Robert Awards	Best Production Design	Simone Grau Roney	Nominated
32nd Robert Awards	Audience Award	Louise Vesth and Lars von Trier	Nominated

== Home media ==
Nymphomaniac was released both together (in a two-disc set) and separately via DVD and Blu-ray in the United States on 8 July 2014. The Extended Director's Cut was later made available in the US on both home media formats on 25 November 2014.

== See also ==
- Anita: Swedish Nymphet, 1973 film
- Unsimulated sex in film
- List of longest films
