= Robert Award for Best Cinematography =

Danish film award

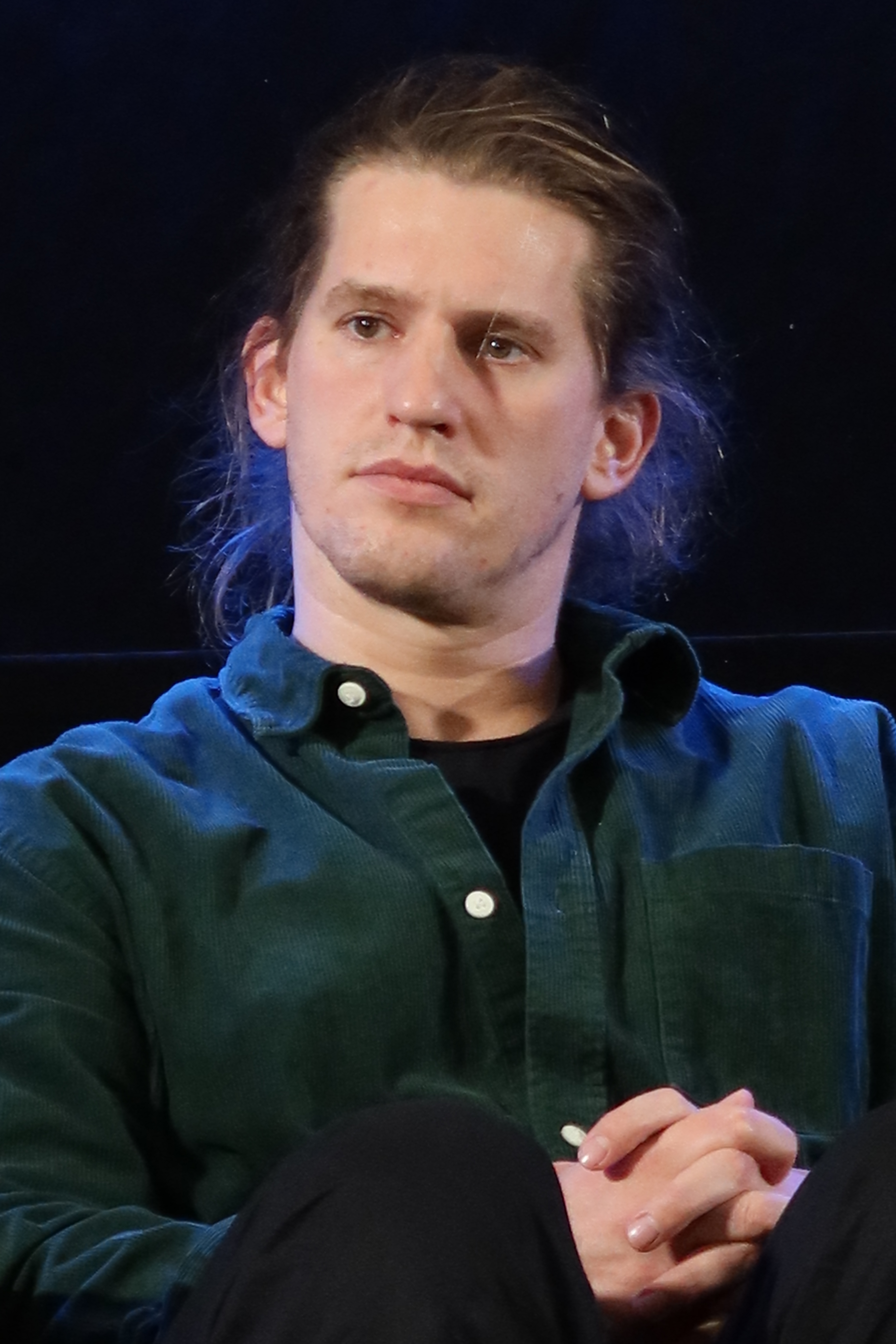
- The 2026 recipient: Michał Dymek
- Country: Denmark
- Presented by: Danish Film Academy
- First award: 1984
- Currently held by: Michał Dymek for The Girl with the Needle (2026)
- Website: robertprisen.dk

The Robert Award for Best Cinematography (Danish: Robert Prisen for årets fotograf) is one of the merit awards presented by the Danish Film Academy at the annual Robert Awards ceremony. The award has been handed out since 1984.

== Winners and nominees ==
=== 1980s ===
- 1984: Dan Laustsen for Thunderbirds
- 1985: Tom Elling for The Element of Crime
- 1986: Mikael Salomon for De flyvende djævle
- 1987: Morten Bruus and Tom Elling for The Dark Side of the Moon & Før gæsterne kommer
- 1988: Jörgen Persson for Pelle the Conqueror
- 1989: Dan Laustsen for Emma's Shadow

=== 1990s ===
- 1990: Dan Laustsen for The Miracle in Valby
- 1991: Dirk Brüel for Springflod
- 1992: Henning Bendtsen for Europa
- 1993: Jan Weincke for Pain of Love
- 1994: Jan Weincke for Black Harvest
- 1995: Eric Kress for Riget
- 1996: Anthony Dod Mantle for The Beast Within (1995 film)
- 1997: Robby Müller for Breaking the Waves
- 1998: Jan Weincke for Barbara
- 1999: Anthony Dod Mantle for The Celebration

=== 2000s ===
- 2000: Dirk Brüel for The Magnetist's Fifth Winter
- 2001: Eric Kress for Flickering Lights
- 2002: Jens Schlosser for The King Is Alive
- 2003: Dan Laustsen for I Am Dina
- 2004: Anthony Dod Mantle for It's All About Love
- 2005: Rasmus Videbæk for King's Game
- 2006: Manuel Alberto Claro for Allegro
- 2007: Jørgen Johansson for Prag
- 2008: Dan Laustsen for Just Another Love Story
- 2009: Jørgen Johansson for Terribly Happy

=== 2010s ===
- 2010: Anthony Dod Mantle for Antichrist
- 2011: Magnus Nordenhof Jønck for R
- 2012: Manuel Alberto Claro for Melancholia
- 2013: Rasmus Videbæk for A Royal Affair
- 2014: Larry Smith for Only God Forgives
- 2015: Manuel Alberto Claro for Nymphomaniac Director's Cut
- 2016: Camilla Hjelm for Land of Mine
- 2017: Natasha Braier for The Neon Demon
- 2018: Maria von Hausswolff for Winter Brothers
- 2019: Manuel Alberto Claro for The House That Jack Built

=== 2020s ===
Year	Cinematographer	Film	Original title	Ref.
2020 (37th)	Jasper J. Spanning	Queen of Hearts	Dronningen	
2020 (37th)	Kasper Tuxen	Valhalla		
2020 (37th)	Eric Kress	Daniel	Ser du månen, Daniel	
2020 (37th)	Sturla Brandth Grøvlen	Before the Frost	Før frosten	
2020 (37th)	Niels Thastum	Exit Plan	Selvmordsturisten	
2021 (38th)	Louise McLaughlin	The Good Traitor	Vores mand i Amerika	
2021 (38th)	Kasper Tuxen	Riders of Justice	Retfærdighedens Ryttere	
2021 (38th)	Sturla Brandth Grøvlen	Another Round	Druk	
2021 (38th)	Jonas Berlin	The Mole: Undercover in North Korea		
2021 (38th)	Jacob Møller	Enforcement	Shorta	
2022 (39th)	Stroud Rohde Pearce	Kandis for Life	Kandis for livet	
2022 (39th)	Jacob Sofussen	The Penultimate	Den Næstsidste	
2022 (39th)	Joachim Fjeldstrup	The Shadow in My Eye	Skyggen i mit øje	
2022 (39th)	Manuel Alberto Claro	Persona Non Grata	Hvor kragerne vender	
2022 (39th)	Rasmus Videbæk	Margrete: Queen of the North	Margrete den Første	
2023 (40th)	Nadim Carlsen	Holy Spider	عنکبوت مقدس	
2023 (40th)	Maria von Hausswolff	Godland	Volaða land	
2023 (40th)	Marcel Zyskind	As in Heaven	Du som er i himlen	
2023 (40th)	Jørgen Johansson	A Lucky Man	Stastny clovek	
2023 (40th)	David Bauer	Krysantemum		
2023 (40th)	Sine Vadstrup Brooker	Ønskebarn		
2024 (41st)	Rasmus Videbæk	The Promised Land	Bastarden	
2024 (41st)	Jacob Møller	Copenhagen Does Not Exist	København findes ikke	
2024 (41st)	Loui Ladegaard	Unsinkable	Synkefri	
2024 (41st)	Linda Wassberg	Empire	Viften	
2024 (41st)	Louise McLaughlin	The Quiet Migration	Stille liv	
2024 (41st)	Mia Mai Dengsø Graabæk	The Great Silence	Den Store Stilhed	
2025 (42nd)	Louise McLaughlin	Matters of the Heart	Fuld af kærlighed	
2025 (42nd)	Jasper Spanning	Sons	Vogter	
2025 (42nd)	Jacob Møller	Eternal	For evigt	
2025 (42nd)	Stroud Rohde Pearce	Madame Ida		
2025 (42nd)	Sine Vadstrup Brooker	Mørkeland		
2025 (42nd)	Nadim Carlsen	Kalak		
2026 (43rd)	Michał Dymek	The Girl with the Needle	Pigen med nålen	
2026 (43rd)	Nicolai Lok	Sauna		
2026 (43rd)	Lasse Frank Johannessen	Special Unit: The First Murder	Rejseholdet - det første mord	
2026 (43rd)	Sebastian Blenkov	The Last Viking	Den sidste viking	
2026 (43rd)	Mia Mai Dengsø Graabæk	Second Victims	Det andet offer	
2026 (43rd)	Jacob Møller	Acts of Love	Kærlighedens gerninger	

== See also ==
- Bodil Award for Best Cinematographer
