= 30th Robert Awards =

2013 Danish film awards ceremony

- Date: 28 February 2013
- Organized by: Danish Film Academy

The 30th Robert Awards ceremony was held on 28 February 2013 in Copenhagen, Denmark. Organized by the Danish Film Academy, the awards honoured the best in Danish and foreign film of 2012.

== Honorees ==
=== Best Danish Film ===
- A Hijacking

=== Best Children's Film ===
- You & Me Forever – Kaspar Munk

=== Best Director ===
- Nikolaj Arcel – A Royal Affair

=== Best Screenplay ===
- Tobias Lindholm – A Hijacking

=== Best Actor in a Leading Role ===
- Søren Malling – A Hijacking

=== Best Actress in a Leading Role ===
- Bodil Jørgensen for Hvidsten gruppen & Trine Dyrholm for Love Is All You Need

=== Best Actor in a Supporting Role ===
- Mikkel Boe Følsgaard – A Royal Affair

=== Best Actress in a Supporting Role ===
- Trine Dyrholm – A Royal Affair

=== Best Production Design ===
- Niels Sejer – A Royal Affair

=== Best Cinematography ===
- Rasmus Videbæk – A Royal Affair

=== Best Costume Design ===
- Manon Rasmussen – A Royal Affair

=== Best Makeup ===
- Ivo Strangmüller & Dennis Knudsen – A Royal Affair

=== Best Editing ===
- Adam Nielsen – A Hijacking

=== Best Sound Design ===
- Morten Green – A Hijacking

=== Best Score ===
- Gabriel Yared & Cyrille Aufort – A Royal Affair

=== Best Special Effects ===
- Jeppe Nygaard Christensen, Esben Syberg & Rikke Hovgaard Jørgensen – A Royal Affair

=== Best Song ===
- "Sangen om Gummi T – Hvem ved hvad der er op og ned" with Annika Aakjær, Halfdan E & Søren Siegumfeldt – Gummi T

=== Best Short Fiction/Animation ===
- Dyret – Malene Choi

=== Best Long Fiction/Animation ===
- Sort kaffe & vinyl – Jesper Bernt

=== Best Documentary Short ===
- Kongens Foged – Phie Ambo

=== Best Documentary Feature ===
- The Act of Killing – Joshua Oppenheimer

=== Best Danish Television Series ===
- Forbrydelsen 3 – Mikkel Serup

=== Best Actor in a Leading Television Role ===
- Nikolaj Lie Kaas – Forbrydelsen 3

=== Best Actress in a Leading Television Role ===
- Sofie Gråbøl – Forbrydelsen 3

=== Best Actor in a Supporting Television Role ===
- Olaf Johannessen – Forbrydelsen 3

=== Supporting Television Actress ===
- Birthe Neumann – Julestjerner

=== Best American Film ===
- Argo – Ben Affleck

=== Best Non-American Film ===
- Amour – Michael Haneke

=== Best Foreign TV Series ===
- Homeland season 2

=== Audience Award ===
- Hvidsten gruppen – as "YouBio Publikumsprisen – Drama"
- Love Is All You Need – as "YouBio Publikumsprisen – Komedie"
- Max Pinlig 3 på Roskilde – as "YouBio Publikumsprisen – Børne- og Ungdomsfilm"
- Forbrydelsen 3 – as "YouBio Publikumsprisen – Tv-serie"

=== The Ib Award ===
- Ronnie Fridthjof

== See also ==
- 2013 Bodil Awards
