= Nagieb Khaja =

Danish journalist

Nagieb Khaja (born 1979 in Copenhagen) is a Danish journalist, documentary filmmaker and writer. A war correspondent, Khaja has reported for the likes of Al Jazeera English, Vice and BBC from Afghanistan, Syria and Palestine. Khaja has been nominated twice for the Cavling Prize, a prestigious Danish journalist award.

== Personal life ==
Khaja is of Afghan descent. He attended the University of Southern Denmark, graduating with a degree in journalism.

== Filmography ==
- 2012: My Afghanistan - Life in the Forbidden Zone (Mit Afghanistan - Livet i den forbudte Zone)
