= 31st Robert Awards =

2014 Danish film awards ceremony

- Date: 26 February 2014
- Organized by: Danish Film Academy

The 31st Robert Awards ceremony was held on 26 February 2014 in Copenhagen, Denmark. Organized by the Danish Film Academy, the awards honoured the best in Danish and foreign film of 2013.

== Honorees ==
=== Best Danish Film ===
- The Hunt

=== Best Children's Film ===
- Antboy – Ask Hasselbalch

=== Best Director ===
- Thomas Vinterberg – The Hunt

=== Best Screenplay ===
- Thomas Vinterberg and Tobias Lindholm – The Hunt

=== Best Actor in a Leading Role ===
- Mads Mikkelsen – The Hunt

=== Best Actress in a Leading Role ===
- Helle Fagralid – Sorrow and Joy

=== Best Actor in a Supporting Role ===
- Nicolas Bro – Sex, Drugs & Taxation

=== Best Actress in a Supporting Role ===
- Susse Wold – The Hunt

=== Best Production Design ===
- Thomas Greve – Sex, Drugs & Taxation

=== Best Cinematography ===
- Larry Smith – Only God Forgives

=== Best Costume Design ===
- Manon Rasmussen – Sex, Drugs & Taxation

=== Best Makeup ===
- Thomas Foldberg, Morten Jacobsen, and Lone Bidstrup Knudsen – Sex, Drugs & Taxation

=== Best Editing ===
- Anne Østerud and Janus Billeskov Jansen - The Hunt

=== Best Sound Design ===
- Kristian Eidnes Andersen – Only God Forgives

=== Best Score ===
- Cliff Martinez – Only God Forgives

=== Best Visual Effects ===
- Hummer Højmark, Rikke Gjerløv Hansen, Thomas Øhlenschlæger, and Jeppe Nygaard Christensen – Antboy

=== Best Short Fiction/Animation ===
- 2 Piger 1 Kage – Jens Dahl

=== Best Long Fiction/Animation ===
- Weekendfar – Johan Stahl Winthereik

=== Best Documentary Short ===
- Tal R: The Virgin – Daniel Dencik

=== Best Documentary Feature ===
- Drømmen om en Familie – Mira Jargil

=== Best Short Television Series ===
- Rytteriet II

=== Best Danish Television Series ===
- Borgen III – Charlotte Sieling

=== Best Actress in a Leading Television Role ===
- Sofia Helin – Broen II

=== Best Actor in a Leading Television Role ===
- Kim Bodnia – Broen II

=== Best Actress in a Supporting Television Role ===
- Camilla Bendix – Broen II

=== Best Actor in a Supporting Television Role ===
- Christian Tafdrup – Borgen III

=== Best American Film ===
- Gravity 3D – Alfonso Cuarón

=== Best Non-American Film ===
- Blue Is the Warmest Colour – Abdellatif Kechiche

=== Audience Award ===
- Alle for to – as "YouSee Publikumsprisen – Komedie"
- The Hunt – as "YouSee Publikumsprisen – Drama"

== See also ==
- 2014 Bodil Awards
