= Daniel (2019 film) =

2019 film

- Directed by: Niels Arden Oplev
- Starring: Esben Smed; Toby Kebbell; Anders W. Berthelsen
- Release date: 29 August 2019
- Running time: 138 minutes
- Country: Denmark
- Language: Danish
- Budget: €5.6 million

Daniel (Danish: Ser du månen, Daniel), also marketed as Held for Ransom, is a 2019 Danish biographical film directed by Niels Arden Oplev, and based on a book by Puk Damsgård. It recalls the experiences of Daniel Rye (played by Esben Smed) who was held hostage by ISIS for 13 months.
