= Baby Fever (TV series) =

Danish television series

- Genre: Comedy drama
- Created by: Amalie Næsby Fick, Nikolaj Feifer
- Country of origin: Denmark
- Original language: Danish
- No. of seasons: 2
- No. of episodes: 12

Original release
- Network: Netflix
- Release: 8 June 2022 – 22 October 2024

Baby Fever (Danish: Skruk) is a Danish television series that premiered on Netflix in June 2022. It stars Josephine Park as Nana, a fertility doctor who drunkenly inseminates herself with her ex-boyfriend's sperm.

The series has had two seasons (2022 and 2024), each with six episodes.

== Plot ==
Nana, a fertility doctor, learns that she has only six months before she will no longer be able to conceive a child. After a drunken night of revelry at her clinic, she steals a sperm sample belonging to her ex-boyfriend, Matthias, who was storing it in the clinic's sperm bank, and uses it to impregnate herself without Matthias' knowledge. Nana learns that she is pregnant. She now has to contend with her professional duties, keep her condition secret and deal with the guilt over her actions and the lies this involves. She sets about trying to win back Matthias, who appears uninterested in her advances.

== Cast and characters ==
- Josephine Park as Nana
- Simon Sears as Mathias
- Olivia Joof Lewerissa as Simone
- Charlotte Munck as Helle
- Mikael Birkkjær as Niels-Anders
- Tammi Øst as Lise Lacour
- Jesper Ole Feit Andersen as Nye Anton
- Oscar Töringe as Hampus (Season 2)

== Reception ==
Danish newspaper Dagbladet Information called season one the best Danish comedy in years, comparing it to Insecure and Fleabag.

The streaming review site Decider gave Baby Fever a "stream it" recommendation, praising Josephine Park's "empathetic and funny performance". FictionHorizon.com gave the first season an 8/10 score.
