= Robert Award for Best Short Television Series =

Danish television award

The Robert Award for Best Short Television Series (Danish: Robert Prisen for årets korte tv-serie) is one of the merit awards presented by the Danish Film Academy at the annual Robert Awards ceremony. The award has been handed out since 2014.

== Honorees ==
=== 2010s ===
- 2014: Rytteriet – Rasmus Botoft, Martin Buch, and Peter Harton
- 2015: Tidsrejsen – Kaspar Munk
- 2016: Ditte & Louise – Ditte Hansen, Louise Mieritz, and Niclas Bendixen
- 2017: Ditte & Louise II – Ditte Hansen, Louise Mieritz, and Niclas Bendixen
- 2018: Tinkas juleeventyr – Flemming Klem and Mogens Hagedorn
- 2019: Doggystyle – Anna Emma Haudal

=== 2020s ===
- 2020: 31 – Jesper Zuschlag and Julie Rudbæk
- 2021: Rytteriet – Natasha Arthy
- 2022: Fredløs – Laurits Flensted-Jensen
- 2023: Orkestret – Mikkel Munch-Fals
- 2024: Killjoy – Jennifer Vedsted Christiansen
- 2025: Orkestret – Mikkel Munch-Fals
- 2026: Klovn – Casper Christensen
