= A Fortunate Man =

2018 film directed by Bille August

- Film poster
- Directed by: Bille August
- Written by: Bille August; Anders August
- Based on: Lucky Per by Henrik Pontoppidan
- Starring: Esben Smed; Katrine Greis-Rosenthal
- Distributed by: Nordisk Film
- Release date: 20 August 2018
- Running time: 162 minutes
- Country: Denmark
- Language: Danish

A Fortunate Man (Danish: Lykke-Per) is a 2018 Danish drama film directed by Bille August. In August 2018, it was one of three films shortlisted to be the Danish entry for the Best Foreign Language Film at the 91st Academy Awards. The film is based on the eight-volume novel (originally translated into English as Lucky Per, but more recently and more precisely as "A Fortunate Man" - the Danish word 'lykke' does not translate simply as "luck") - by Danish Nobel Prize-winning author Henrik Pontoppidan and published between 1898 and 1904. The film's title comes from the 2018 translation by Paul Larkin – A Fortunate Man, published by Museum Tusculanum Press – and the film was released on American Netflix streaming on 19 April 2019.

== Plot ==
The film is set in the late 19th century when the main character Peter Sidenius gets accepted to study engineering at a university. He leaves rural Jutland for Copenhagen and breaks ties with his overbearing, pious father and Christian, more specifically calvinist background. He hates his father and he rejects a gift of his father's pocket watch. The self-confident Peter, free of family and Christian religion, is poor but studies hard. He befriends a waitress who teaches him the ways of the city and introduces him to the world of sex but she is dismissed on his rise up in social status.

Peter meets Ivan Salomon, from a wealthy Jewish banking family. Ivan likes the ambitious, smart engineer and especially likes Peter's revolutionary grand future project to harness water and wind power to develop the country with electricity. Ivan helps Peter adjust to free-thinking intellectuals, new political thought, monied-class businessmen, cultural rules and expectations, and the Salomon family. Their daughter Jakobe was to marry Eybert, a little older, wealthy, and established Jewish man, but instead falls in love with Peter. Peter fails to win ministerial government approval for his plans. Phillip, the senior Salomon, decides to send Peter to Austria to further his engineering studies and get others' review of his plans for canals, windmills, and water energy. Peter and Jakobe are separated by his travels.

Peter hears from his brother Eberhardt that their father is gravely ill; however, because the Sidenius family does not approve of Jakobe because she is Jewish, Peter leaves for Vienna and does not attend his father's funeral. Jakobe violates her own family norms by going to Austria to visit Peter. They exchange words and acts of love, and she becomes pregnant. As Austrian scholars approve of Peter's ideas, Ivan and his father set up financial backing. Jakobe is making wedding plans and a joint trip to England. Unbeknownst to Peter, his destitute widowed mother moves to Copenhagen and begs Peter to return to Christ. She attempts to give Peter his father's pocket watch. Peter becomes angry at a story his mother shares and leaves without the watch.

A project meeting is set and everything is a go except for the local government minister's approval. Peter refuses to apologize for an earlier outburst and his pride and arrogance kill the project. Peter's mother dies and leaves him the watch with a letter of advice. Peter takes her body back to Jutland for burial beside his father and stays for an indeterminate time. During his stay in the countryside, Peter's eye wanders to Inger, the Vicar's daughter. He has restless nights and faces an existential crisis, believing his father has cursed him and that God is judging him and his lifestyle. When Peter returns to Copenhagen, he calls off the engagement with Jakobe. Jakobe is devastated, not telling Peter she is pregnant. Peter is now rejected by Copenhagen society and returns home destitute. Jakobe gets a private abortion.

Peter returns home and marries Inger. They have three children but are not happy. Peter soon isolates himself from his wife and children. Jakobe takes what would have been her inheritance and starts a charity school for the abandoned and orphaned children in Copenhagen. In response to a letter from Peter, Jakobe travels to Jutland to visit Peter one last time. He tells her that he is dying of cancer and bequeaths his meager estate to her school. In the final scene, Peter walks to the shoreline and stands at the same site where he once celebrated his admittance to the university.

== Cast ==
- Esben Smed as Peter Sidenius
- Katrine Greis-Rosenthal as Jakobe Salomon
- Benjamin Kitter as Ivan Salomon
- Julie Christiansen (actor) as Nanny Salomon
- Tommy Kenter as Phillip Salomon
- Sophie-Marie Jeppesen as Lisbeth
- Tammi Øst as Lea Salomon
- Rasmus Bjerg as Eybert
- Sara Viktoria Bjerregaard as Inger
- Elsebeth Steentofts as Fru Sidenius
- Anders Hove as Pastor Sidenius
- Jens Albinus as Eberhardt Sidenius

== Critical response ==
At the 2019 New York Jewish Film Festival, Elisebeth Dyssegaard said about the film:

"A gifted but self-destructive young man leaves his suffocating Lutheran upbringing in the country for the metropolitan Copenhagen of the 1880s. An engineer with progressive ideas, he is welcomed by a wealthy Jewish family and insinuates himself into their opulent milieu, embarking on a journey of personal and professional ambition that teeters on the razor’s edge between triumph and catastrophe. A sprawling story of grand scope and high romance from the Academy Award–winning director of 'Pelle the Conqueror', 'A Fortunate Man' is a rare kind of film—beautifully realized, full of exceptional performances, and with a dramatic sweep on par with the great classics of cinema."
