= Persona Non Grata (2021 film) =

2021 film

- Directed by: Lisa Jespersen
- Starring: Rosalinde Mynster; Bodil Jørgensen
- Release date: 31 January 2021 (GFF)
- Running time: 91 minutes
- Country: Denmark
- Language: Danish

Persona Non Grata (Danish: Hvor kragerne vender) is a 2021 Danish drama film directed by Lisa Jespersen. It won the 2022 Bodil Award for Best Danish Film.

== Cast ==
- Rosalinde Mynster - Laura
- Bodil Jørgensen - Jane
- Anne Sofie Wanstrup - Catrine
- Adam Ild Rohweder - Jannik
- Thomas Hwan - Benjamin
- Jesper Groth - David
- Jens Jørn Spottag - Iver
