= Robert Award for Best Long Fiction/Animation =

Danish film award

The Robert Award for Best Long Fiction/Animation (Danish: Robert Prisen for årets lange fiktion/animation) is one of the merit awards presented by the Danish Film Academy at the annual Robert Awards ceremony. The award has been handed out since 2007.

== Honorees ==
=== 2000s ===
- 2007: Liv – Heidi Maria Faisst
- 2008: Ung mand falder – Martin de Thurah
- 2009: En forelskelse – Christian Tafdrup

=== 2010s ===
- 2010: Bobby – Julie Bille
- 2011: Limboland – Jeremy Weller
- 2012: Min bror Karim – Asger K. Kallesøe
- 2013: Sort kaffe & vinyl – Jesper Bernt
- 2014: Weekendfar – Johan Stahl Winthereik
- 2015: Lulu – Caroline Sascha Cogez
