= Robert Award for Best Danish Television Series =

Danish Film Academy award

The Robert Award for Best Danish Television Series (Danish: Robert Prisen for årets danske tv-serie) is one of the merit awards presented by the Danish Film Academy at the annual Robert Awards ceremony. The award has been handed out since 2013 (for series premiering in 2012), joining the awards presented for films since 1984.

== Winners ==
- 2013: Forbrydelsen 3 (The Killing) – Søren Sveistrup, Torleif Hoppe, Michael W. Horsten, and Mikkel Serup
- 2014: Borgen III – Charlotte Sieling
- 2015: The Legacy – Maya Ilsøe and Pernilla August
- 2016: The Legacy II – Maya Ilsøe and Jesper Christensen
- 2017: Bedrag – Jeppe Gjervig Gram and Per Fly
- 2018: Herrens Veje – Adam Price and Kaspar Munk
- 2019: Herrens Veje II – Adam Price and Kaspar Munk
- 2024: Prisoner (Huset)
