= Robert Award for Best Director =

Danish film award

The Robert Award for Best Director (Danish: Robert Prisen for årets instruktør) is presented at an annual Robert Award show hosted by the Danish Film Academy. The category was introduced in 2001 and all directors of Danish films irrespective of the language of the film are eligible. The winner is selected among five nominees.

== Honorees ==
=== 2000s ===
- 2001: Per Fly for The Bench
  - Natasha Arthy nominated for Mirakel
  - Stefan Fjeldmark and Michael Hegner nominated for Help! I'm a Fish
  - Lone Scherfig nominated for Italian for Beginners
  - Lars von Trier nominated for Dancer in the Dark
- 2002: Ole Christian Madsen for Kira's Reason: A Love Story
  - Gert Fredholm nominated for One-Hand Clapping
  - Hella Joof nominated for Shake It All About
  - Cæcilia Holbek Trier nominated for Send More Candy
  - Kristian Levring nominated for The King Is Alive
- 2003: Nils Malmros for Facing the Truth
  - Susanne Bier nominated for Open Hearts
  - Jesper W. Nielsen nominated for Okay
  - Helle Ryslinge nominated for Halalabad Blues
  - Lone Scherfig nominated for Wilbur Wants to Kill Himself
- 2004: Per Fly for The Inheritance
  - Christoffer Boe nominated for Reconstruction
  - Anders Thomas Jensen nominated for Open Hearts
  - Jannik Johansen nominated for Stealing Rembrandt
  - Lars von Trier nominated for Dancer in the Dark
- 2005: Nikolaj Arcel for King's Game
  - Annette K. Olsen nominated for In Your Hands
  - Nicolas Winding Refn nominated for Pusher II
  - Simon Staho nominated for Day and Night
  - Paprika Steen nominated for Aftermath
- 2006: Per Fly for Manslaughter
  - Christoffer Boe nominated for Allegro
  - Anders Thomas Jensen nominated for Adam's Apples
  - Åke Sandgren nominated for Flies on the Wall
  - Lars von Trier nominated for Manderlay
- 2007: Niels Arden Oplev for We Shall Overcome
  - Christoffer Boe nominated for Offscreen
  - Christian E. Christiansen nominated for Life Hits
  - Pernille Fischer Christensen nominated for A Soap
  - Ole Christian Madsen and Valerie Faris nominated for Prague
  - Anders Morgenthaler nominated for Princess
- 2008: Peter Schønau Fog for The Art of Crying
  - Nikolaj Arcel nominated for Island of Lost Souls
  - Ole Bornedal nominated for Just Another Love Story
  - Anders Morgenthaler nominated for Echo
  - Simon Staho nominated for Daisy Diamond
- 2009: Henrik Ruben Genz for Terribly Happy
  - Kristian Levring nominated for Fear Me Not
  - Ole Christian Madsen nominated for Flame & Citron
  - Annette K. Olesen nominated for Little Soldier
  - Niels Arden Oplev nominated for Worlds Apart

=== 2010s ===
- 2010: Lars von Trier for Antichrist
  - Ole Bornedal nominated for Deliver Us from Evil
  - Hella Joof nominated for Hush Little Baby
  - Rumle Hammerich nominated for Headhunter
  - Nils Malmros nominated for Aching Hearts
- 2011: Tobias Lindholm and Michael Noer for R
  - Nikolaj Arcel nominated for Truth About Men
  - Susanne Bier nominated for In a Better World
  - Nicolo Donato (film director) nominated for Brotherhood
  - Thomas Vinterberg nominated for Submarino
- 2012: Lars von Trier for Melancholia
  - Pernille Fischer Christensen nominated for A Family
  - Ole Christian Madsen nominated for SuperClásico
  - Carlos Augusto de Oliveira nominated for Rosa Morena
  - Martin Zandvliet nominated for A Funny Man
- 2013: Nikolaj Arcel for A Royal Affair
- 2014: Thomas Vinterberg for The Hunt
- 2015: Lars von Trier for Nymphomaniac Director's Cut
- 2016: Martin Zandvliet for Land of Mine
- 2017: Christian Tafdrup for Parents
- 2018: Hlynur Pálmason for Winter Brothers
- 2019: Gustav Möller for The Guilty

=== 2020s ===
- 2020: May el-Toukhy for Dronningen
- 2021: Thomas Vinterberg for Another Round
  - Anders Thomas Jensen nominated for Riders of Justice
  - Christina Rosendahl nominated for The Good Traitor
  - Jeanette Nordahl nominated for Kød & Blod
  - Malou Reymann nominated for A Perfectly Normal Family
