= Josephine Park =

Danish actress (born 1987)

- Born: 10 April 1987 (age 39); Copenhagen, Denmark
- Occupation: Actress
- Years active: 2013–present
- Spouse: Kirstine K. Høgsbro (married 2018-2023)

Josephine Park (born 10 April 1987) is a Danish actress. She is known for her roles in a number of Danish films, including Attachment (Natten har øjne; 2022), as well as television series, including Dicte (2013) and Oxen (2023–).

== Early life and education ==
Josephine Park was born in Copenhagen, Denmark, on 10 April 1987. Her parents divorced when she was two years old.

Park moved to Aarhus to study acting at the acting academy (Skuespilskolen) at Aarhus Theatre, graduating in 2014.

== Career ==
=== Television ===
While still a student, Park appeared in the 2013 TV series Dicte, and was also cast in a supporting role as Isa Varlø in DR's large-scale family drama The Legacy (Arvingerne), initially in season 1 in 2014, and then in season 2 in 2015.

Park played a major role as Jose in the series Doggystyle (2018–2022), and played a recurring role in the 2019-20 series Those Who Kill (Den som dræber – Fanget af mørket). She played the lead role as a fertility doctor in the Netflix comedy series Baby Fever (Danish: Skruk) (2022–24). and appears in season 3 of Forhøret (Face to Face) in 2023.

In 2023, she played the lead role in the Netflix true crime series The Nurse (Sygeplejersken), based on the book of the same name by Kristian Corfixen, about a Danish nurse who was convicted of attempted manslaughter of four patients at Nykøbing Falster Hospital. In the same year, she took the lead role in Suplex, a murder mystery four-part miniseries written by Adam August, Jens Dahl, and Christian Bengtson, produced by Drive Studios for YouSee Originals.

From 2023, Park plays a major role as police investigator Margrethe Franck in the crime drama series Oxen, based on the crime novel series of the same name by Danish crime writer Jens Henrik Jensen.

=== Film ===
Park made her film debut in 2014 in Lev stærkt, as Nete. She also starred as Maja in the 2022 Danish film Attachment (Natten har øjne).

She played one of the lead roles as Andrea in The Venus Effect (Venuseffekten), written and directed by Anna Emma Haudal and released in 2021. Catherine Bray, writing in The Guardian, gave the film 4 out of 5 stars, calling it "a sizzling queer romcom without the cliches".

Other roles in Danish films include:

- Shorta (2020), as Rønning
- Centervagt (2021), as MC
- Miss Viborg (2022), as Michala
- Mango (2025), as Lærke
- Pigedyr (2026), as Monika

== Recognition and awards ==
- 2015: Reumert Prize for Talent of the Year (Reumertprisen Årets Talent)
- 2019: Robert Award for Best Actress in a Supporting Television Role, for Doggystyle
- 2020: Robert Award for Best Actress in a Supporting Television Role, for Doggystyle
- 2022: Robert Award for Best Actress in a Supporting Role, for her role in The Venus Effect (Venuseffekten)
- 2022: Ove Sprogøe Prize, awarded at Nordisk Film's Isbjørnen (Polar Bear Awards)

== Personal ==
In 2015 Park met her future wife playwright and psychologist Kirstine K. Høgsbro. They married in 2018, and have a son together. They separated in 2023.

In early 2024 she met producer Ruth Reid at the Robert Awards, who was working for Netflix, and the couple revealed in November of that year that they were in a relationship. Reid, whose work has been nominated for a BAFTA, was born in Scotland but had started living and working in Sweden for some years prior. Reid continues to live in Stockholm, while Park remains based in Denmark, and as of January 2025 couple had no plans to move in together. In March 2025 it was announced that Reid had been appointed by Danish production company Miso Film to oversee their TV series production in Denmark, Norway, and Sweden, starting on 1 May.
