= 29th Robert Awards =

2012 Danish film awards ceremony

- Date: 5 February 2012
- Organized by: Danish Film Academy

Highlights
- Best Film: Melancholia
- Most awards: Melancholia (10)
- Most nominations: Melancholia (13)

The 29th Robert Awards ceremony was held on 5 February 2012 in Copenhagen, Denmark. Organized by the Danish Film Academy, the awards honoured the best in Danish and foreign film of 2011.

== Honorees ==
=== Best Danish Film ===
- Melancholia

=== Best Children's Film ===
- Rebounce – Heidi Maria Faisst

=== Best Director ===
- Lars von Trier – Melancholia

=== Best Screenplay ===
- Lars von Trier – Melancholia

=== Best Actor in a Leading Role ===
- Nikolaj Lie Kaas – A Funny Man

=== Best Actress in a Leading Role ===
- Kirsten Dunst – Melancholia

=== Best Actor in a Supporting Role ===
- Lars Ranthe – A Funny Man

=== Best Actress in a Supporting Role ===
- Charlotte Gainsbourg – Melancholia

=== Best Production Design ===
- Jette Lehmann – Melancholia

=== Best Cinematography ===
- Manuel Alberto Claro – Melancholia

=== Best Costume Design ===
- Stine Gudmundsen-Holmgreen – A Funny Man

=== Best Makeup ===
- Lis Kasper Bang – A Funny Man

=== Best Editing ===
- Molly Malene Stensgaard – Melancholia

=== Best Sound Design ===
- Kristian Eidnes Andersen – Melancholia

=== Best Score ===
- Sune Martin – A Funny Man

=== Best Special Effects ===
- Hummer Højmark & Peter Hjort – Melancholia

=== Best Song ===
- "Lille frk. Himmelblå" – A Funny Man

=== Best Short Fiction/Animation ===
- Girl in the Water – Jeppe Rønde & Woo Ming Jin

=== Best Long Fiction/Animation ===
- Min bror Karim – Asger K. Kallesøe

=== Documentary Short ===
- Den tid vi har – Mira Jargil

=== Best Documentary Feature ===
- The Ambassador – Mads Brügger

=== Best American Film ===
- Drive – Nicolas Winding Refn

=== Best Non-American Film ===
- The King's Speech – Tom Hooper

=== Audience Award ===
- All for One – as "Yousee Publikumsprisen"

== See also ==
- 2012 Bodil Awards
