= Prisoner (Danish TV series) =

2023 Danish prison drama series

Prisoner (Danish: Huset; lit. "The House") is a 2023 Danish prison drama television series starring Sofie Gråbøl and David Dencik. Comprising six episodes, the series was created by Danish author and playwright Kim Fupz Aakeson, inspired by his 2021 novel Fangeleg.

== Synopsis ==
The series follows four prison officers who follow different approaches in their work and towards prisoners in the prison they work in, and shows the effect on the prisoners. Miriam does things as rules dictate, but also shows some compassion towards the prisoners. Sammi is a new recruit, with an idealistic view of how things should be, who is shown around the prison by Henrik, an experienced and veteran officer, who prefers the quiet life and is not averse to bending the rules to this end. Gert, the prison governor, admires Sammi's idealism, but is rather cynical about what can be achieved.

The prison is scheduled for closure, and it is in the interests of the prison officers to try to improve things to impress the prison inspectors, so that it would stay open.

== Cast ==
- Sofie Gråbøl as Miriam
- David Dencik as Henrik
- Youssef Wayne Hvidtfeld as Sammi (Samir)
- Charlotte Fich as Gert, prison governor
- Gustav Dyekjær Giese, an inmate and former childhood friend of Sammi

== Production ==
Huset is the original Danish name of this prison drama series, which means "the house". It was created and written by Danish author and playwright Kim Fupz Aakeson, inspired by his 2021 novel Fangeleg. Co-creators Frederik Louis Hviid and Michael Noer are credited as co-creators as well as series directors. The directors did a lot of research and most of the incidents are based on real-life incidents that had occurred in Danish prisons.

The series was filmed at Vridsløselille Prison, an old prison outside Copenhagen. Several of the supporting cast had spent time prison. It was produced by the Danish public broadcaster's drama unit, DR Drama, and distributed by DR Sales.

Youssef Wayne Hvidtfeld, who plays Sammi, has a Moroccan father, and is multilingual. He appears in series 4 of Borgen, Borgen – Power and Glory, which debuted on Netflix after a hiatus of 10 years

== Broadcast ==
Prisoner / Huset had its world premiere in competition at the 2023 Canneseries annual television festival in April 2023 in Cannes, France. The series aired in Denmark from 1 September 2023 on DR TV and from 3 September on DR1.

Prisoner was released by public broadcaster SBS Television on its free-to-air streaming service SBS On Demand in Australia in December 2023. In the UK, it was broadcast on BBC Four from 24 February 2024, with two episodes screening each Saturday night for three weeks. It was also made available on BBC iPlayer at the same time. In the United States, Prisoner was released on MHz Choice in March 2024.

== Reception ==
Debi Enker gave the series 4 out of 5 stars in The Sydney Morning Herald , saying "The series fairly thrums with tension. It’s as hard to look away from the unfolding action as it is to watch it, as gripping as it is gruelling".

Rebecca Nicholson, for The Guardian, gave the series 4 out of 5 stars, writing: "This is grey, grainy and rainy drama, highly strung, impossibly taut, and compelling to the end". Benji Wilson, for The Telegraph, gave the series 4 out of 5 stars, writing "Superbly shot and with sensational performances throughout, Prisoner is gut-punch drama". Along with several other articles, Wilson compares it with the 2021 BBC/Britbox prison drama series Time.

The American website Foreign Crime Drama gave the film 85% in its review.
