= Robert Award for Best Actor in a Supporting Television Role =

Danish Film Academy award

The Robert Award for Best Actor in a Supporting Television Role (Danish: Robert Prisen for årets mandlige birolle – tv-serie) is one of the merit awards presented by the Danish Film Academy at the annual Robert Awards ceremony. The award has been handed out since 2013.

== Honorees ==
=== 2010s ===
- 2013: Olaf Johannessen – Forbrydelsen 3
- 2014: Christian Tafdrup – Borgen III
- 2015: Mikkel Boe Følsgaard – The Legacy
- 2016: Jesper Christensen – The Legacy
- 2017: Esben Smed – Follow the Money
- 2018: Mikkel Boe Følsgaard – The Legacy
- 2019: Lars Ranthe – Warrior

=== 2020s ===
- 2020: Jacob Lohmann – Bedrag
- 2021: Peter Plaugborg – Ulven kommer
- 2022: David Dencik – The Chestnut Man
- 2023: Nicolai Jørgensen – Carmen Curlers
- 2024: David Dencik – Prisoner
- 2025: Clint Ruben – Bullshit
- 2026: Jan Linnebjerg – Generationer
