= Mikkel Boe Følsgaard =

Danish actor (born 1984)

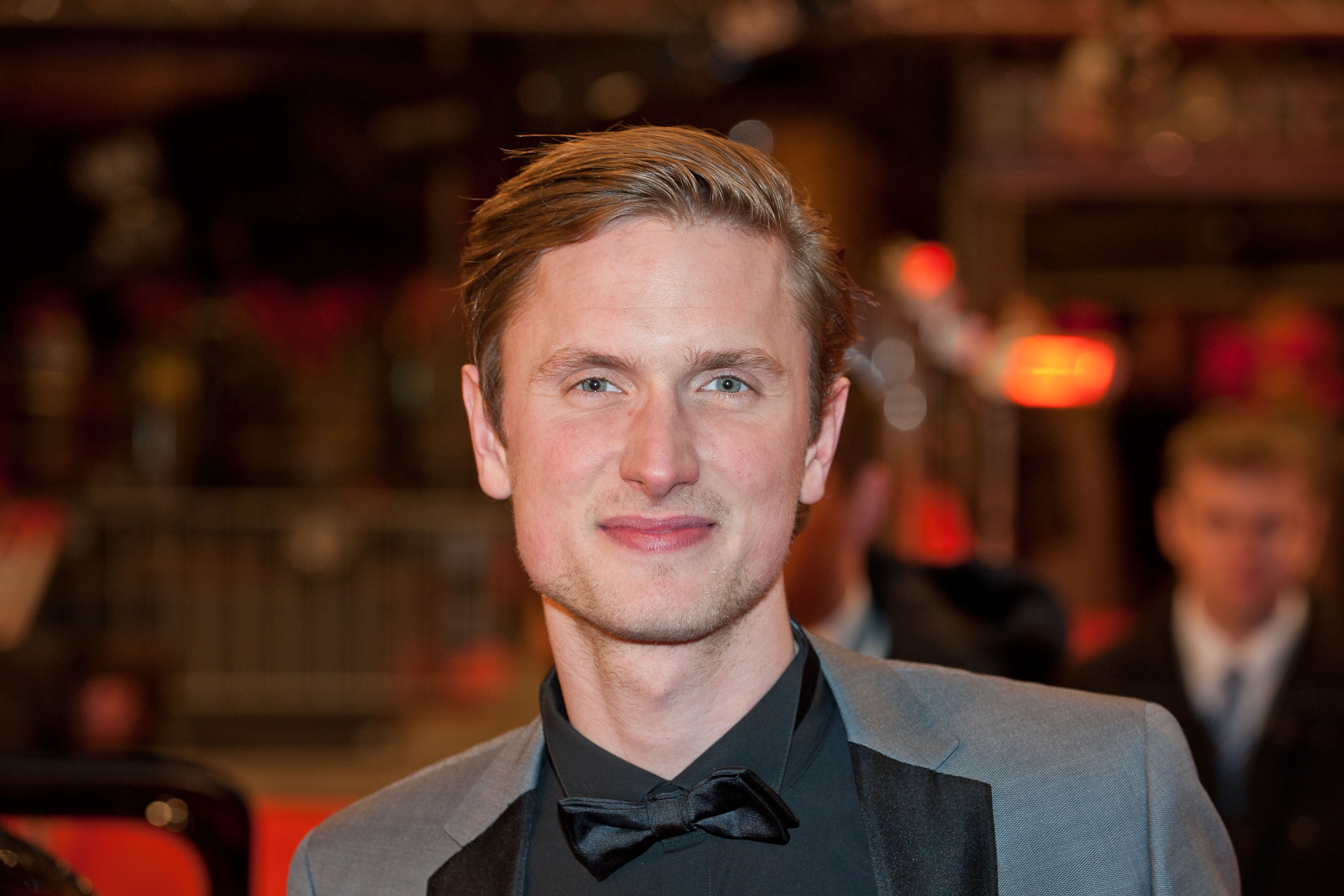
- Følsgaard in 2013
- Born: 1 May 1984 (age 42); Rønne, Denmark
- Education: Danish National School of Performing Arts
- Occupation: Actor
- Years active: 2012–present
- Spouse: Freja Friis (2016–present)
- Children: 2

Mikkel Boe Følsgaard (Danish: [ˈme̝kl̩ ˈpoˀ ˈfølsˌkɒˀ]; born 1 May 1984) is a Danish actor. He graduated from the Danish National School of Performing Arts and has appeared in films and television series such as A Royal Affair (2012), The Legacy (2014–2017), Summer of '92 (2015), Land of Mine (2015), Walk with Me (2016), A Perfectly Normal Family (2020), The Chestnut Man (2021–2026), and Borgen (2022). He played Gérard de Villefort in the English-language series The Count of Monte Cristo (2024). He has received several awards for his performances, including the Bodil and Robert awards, and became the first Danish actor to win the Silver Bear for Best Actor at the Berlin International Film Festival.

== Early life and education ==
Følsgaard was born on 1 May 1984 in Rønne, Denmark. He has an older brother, and his family moved to Gilleleje when he was six. While in high school, he developed an interest in acting, participating in school productions and founding a theatre company with friends.

After graduating from high school, Følsgaard applied to drama school but was rejected. His next two attempts were also unsuccessful. In 2008, on his fourth attempt, he was accepted to the Danish National School of Performing Arts. He described this period of rejection as "many years of hard work and struggle that fortunately ended well."

== Career ==
=== 2012–2017 ===
Følsgaard got his first taste of acting at the age of 10 when he appeared in an episode of TV 2's historical drama Bryggeren (1997). After seeing a casting advertisement in a newspaper, his grandfather took him and his brother to Nordisk Film's studio in Valby, where they both auditioned and Følsgaard was cast. He did not act again until high school.

During his third year at drama school, he auditioned for the role of King Christian VII in Nikolaj Arcel's period drama A Royal Affair (2012). Arcel described casting the then-unknown acting student as "the coolest bet I've ever made." Følsgaard received widespread acclaim for his performance and became the first Danish actor to win the Silver Bear for Best Actor at the Berlin International Film Festival. He also won the Bodil Award and Robert Award for Best Actor and Best Supporting Actor, respectively. The film was nominated for Best Foreign Language Film at both the Golden Globe and Academy Awards. In 2013, Følsgaard was one of the ten recipients of the Shooting Stars Award presented by European Film Promotion at the Berlinale. The international jury noted, "Seeing him in A Royal Affair, one instantly knows that he can play any part. For his first role, he is simply breathtaking, taking care of every detail, showing incredible physical adeptness. We never see him creating emotions, they are just there. Like a miracle."

From 2014 to 2017, Følsgaard played Emil Grønnegaard in the drama series The Legacy. Over its three seasons run, the series enjoyed immense popularity in Denmark and was sold to over 40 countries. For this role, Følsgaard won the Robert Award for Best Actor in a Supporting Television Role in 2015 and 2018.

In 2015, he played the lead role in Frederikke Aspöck's romantic drama Rosita, which was well received by critics. That same year, he also appeared in Kasper Barfoed's biographical sports comedy Summer of '92 and Martin Zandvliet's war drama Land of Mine, which was nominated for Best Foreign Language Film at the Academy Awards. For his performances in these films, Følsgaard received two nominations for Best Supporting Actor at the Robert Awards.

In 2016, he starred in Lisa Ohlin's film Walk with Me, which earned him the Best Actor nomination at both the Bodil and Robert awards. He then appeared in the Swedish film A Serious Game (2016), directed by Pernilla August. In 2017, he played former professional boxer Jørgen Hansen in Mikkel Serup's biographical drama Pound for Pound. Despite some criticism that he was too young for the part, the film received generally positive reviews and he was nominated for a Bodil Award for Best Actor.

=== 2018–present ===
From 2018 to 2020, Følsgaard starred in the post-apocalyptic Netflix series The Rain. (Note: Følsgaard also voiced his characters in the English dubs of The Rain and The Chestnut Man.) While the first season was well-received, the following two were criticised for their weak storylines.

In 2020, he starred in Malou Reymann's directorial debut, A Perfectly Normal Family, based on her family's experience with her father's transition to a woman. For this role, he was nominated for Best Actor at the Bodil and Robert awards. Also that year, he played the Danish diplomat Povl Bang-Jensen in Christina Rosendahl's biographical drama The Good Traitor.

In 2021, Følsgaard starred in the Netflix crime series The Chestnut Man, which brought him a nomination for Best Actor in a Leading Television Role at the Robert Awards. He also appeared in the first ever Danish-Japanese co-production, the drama film Miss Osaka. In 2022, he joined the cast of the hit Danish series Borgen, which returned for a fourth season after a nine-year break. The fourth season received critical acclaim, and Følsgaard was nominated for Best Actor in a Leading Television Role at the Robert Awards.

In 2023, he reunited with his Borgen co-star, Sidse Babett Knudsen, in Bille August's historical comedy Ehrengard: The Art of Seduction, based on a short story by Karen Blixen. Queen Margrethe II designed the costumes for the film. In 2024, he collaborated with August again, playing Gérard de Villefort in the English-language series The Count of Monte Cristo. Also that year, he appeared in his seventh film directed by a woman, the biographical drama The Swedish Torpedo. The film premiered at the Toronto International Film Festival to positive reviews.

== Personal life ==
In 2016, Følsgaard married Freja Friis, with whom he has a son and a daughter.

== Acting credits ==
=== Film ===
Year	Title	Role	Notes	Ref.
2009	Bastian at Roskilde – For the First Time	Bastian Larsen	Short film; mockumentary	
2012	A Royal Affair	Christian VII		
2013	The Keeper of Lost Causes	Uffe Lynggaard		
2015	Rosita	Johannes		
2015	Summer of '92	Kim Vilfort		
2015	Land of Mine	Lt. Ebbe Jensen		
2016	A Serious Game	Carl Lidner		
2016	Walk with Me	Thomas Ingerslev		
2016	Across the Waters	Jørgen		
2017	You Disappear	Prosecutor		
2017	Pound for Pound	Jørgen Hansen		
2017	Kein Problem	Nicolaj	Short film	
2020	A Perfectly Normal Family	Thomas / Agnete		
2020	The Good Traitor	Povl Bang-Jensen		
2021	Miss Osaka	Lucas		
2023	Superposition	Teit		
2023	Ehrengard: The Art of Seduction	Cazotte		
2023	Stockholm Bloodbath	Didrik Slagheck		
2024	The Swedish Torpedo	Henry		
2025	Man Up!	Rasmus		

=== Television ===
Year	Title	Role	Notes	Ref.
1997	Bryggeren	Carl Jacobsen	Episode: "1849–1854"	
2011	Those Who Kill	Oleg	Only his photo; Episode: "An eye for an eye, part 1"	
2013	Dicte	Cato Vinding	Episode: "Violence and power, part 2"	
2014–2017	The Legacy	Emil Grønnegaard	Main cast	
2018–2020	The Rain	Martin	Main cast	
2021–2026	The Chestnut Man	Mark Hess	Main cast	
2022	Borgen	Asger Holm Kirkegaard	Main cast (season 4)	
2024	The Count of Monte Cristo	Gérard de Villefort	Main cast	
TBA	The Best of Families		Main cast	

=== Podcasts ===
Year	Title	Role	Notes	Ref.
2012	Superman		DR P1 radio drama	
2012	Congo	Robert	DR P1 radio drama	
2013	Mother's Darling	Thomas	DR P1 radio drama	
2018	Back to Mars	Zan	DR P1 radio drama	

== Awards and nominations ==
Award	Year	Category	Nominee / Work	Result	Ref.
Berlin International Film Festival	2012	Best Actor	A Royal Affair	Won	
Berlin International Film Festival	2013	Shooting Stars Award	Mikkel Boe Følsgaard	Won	
Bodil Awards	2013	Best Actor in a Leading Role	A Royal Affair	Won	
Bodil Awards	2017	Best Actor in a Leading Role	Walk with Me	Nominated	
Bodil Awards	2018	Best Actor in a Leading Role	Pound for Pound	Nominated	
Bodil Awards	2021	Best Actor in a Leading Role	A Perfectly Normal Family	Nominated	
Ekko Shortlist Awards	2017	Best Actor	Kein Problem	Nominated	
Lauritzen Award	2012	Believe-in-You Award	Mikkel Boe Følsgaard	Won	
Lauritzen Award	2021	Lauritzen Award	Mikkel Boe Følsgaard	Won	
Robert Awards	2013	Best Actor in a Supporting Role	A Royal Affair	Won	
Robert Awards	2015	Best Actor in a Supporting Television Role	The Legacy	Won	
Robert Awards	2016	Best Actor in a Supporting Role	Land of Mine	Nominated	
Robert Awards	2016	Best Actor in a Supporting Role	Summer of '92	Nominated	
Robert Awards	2017	Best Actor in a Leading Role	Walk with Me	Nominated	
Robert Awards	2018	Best Actor in a Supporting Television Role	The Legacy	Won	
Robert Awards	2021	Best Actor in a Leading Role	A Perfectly Normal Family	Nominated	
Robert Awards	2022	Best Actor in a Leading Television Role	The Chestnut Man	Nominated	
Robert Awards	2023	Best Actor in a Leading Television Role	Borgen	Nominated	
