= Ditlevsen =

Ditlevsen is a surname. It is the surname of:

- Knud Ditlevsen (1925–2006), Danish sprint canoer
- Sara Hjort Ditlevsen (born 1988), Danish actress
- Susanne Ditlevsen, Danish mathematician and statistician
- Tove Ditlevsen (1917–1976), Danish poet and author
