= Search: The Naina Murder Case =

- Genre: Crime; Drama
- Based on: The Killing by Søren Sveistrup
- Written by: Radhika Anand; Shreya Karunakaram
- Directed by: Rohan Sippy
- Starring: Konkona Sen Sharma; Shraddha Das; Shiv Panditt; Surya Sharma
- Composer: Pranaay
- Country of origin: India
- Original language: Hindi
- No. of seasons: 1
- No. of episodes: 6

Production
- Executive producers: Rahul Prakash; Prasoon Grag; Rajesh Sethi; Søren Sveistrup; Piv Bernth; Ingolf Gabold
- Producers: Sameer Nair; Deepak Segal; Maansi S Darrbaar; Amrita Sen
- Cinematography: Murzy Pagdiwala
- Editor: Abhishek Seth
- Production companies: Applause Entertainment; Highgate Entertainment

Original release
- Network: JioHotstar
- Release: 10 October 2025

Search: The Naina Murder Case is a 2025 Indian Hindi-language crime thriller web series streaming on JioHotstar. It is directed by Rohan Sippy and produced by Applause Entertainment and Highgate Entertainment .

It stars Konkona Sen Sharma, Shraddha Das, Shiv Panditt and Surya Sharma and was released on 10 October 2025. It's based on the Danish TV Series The Killing.

== Synopsis ==
The story revolves around the murder of college student Naina Marathe (Chandsi Kataria), who is believed to have been raped before her body is discovered in the trunk of a car submerged in a lake. On her final day at work, ACP Sanyukta Das (Konkona)—preparing to relocate to Ahmedabad with her husband and teenage daughter to focus on family over her demanding career—is unexpectedly assigned the case. Tensions rise within the police force when it emerges that the car containing Naina’s body belongs to a politician (Shiv Panditt), ironically engaged in developing a women’s safety app. Das is joined in her pursuit of the killer by her successor, ACP Kanwal—an impulsive, overbearing officer eager to wrap up the case quickly. Their clashing temperaments spark friction, even as Das struggles with the collapse of her marriage and the emotional turmoil of a teenage daughter who seeks refuge online. The investigation grows increasingly complicated when the evidence against their initial suspects, Naina’s college peers, begins to unravel.

== Cast ==
- Konkona Sen Sharma as ACP Sanyukta Das
- Surya Sharma as ACP Jai Kanwal
- Shraddha Das as Raksha Patil
- Shiv Panditt as Tushar Surve
- Iravati Harshe as Payal Marathe
- Govind Namdeo as Pradeep Bhosle
- Varun Thakur as Randhir Jha
- Dhruv Sehgal as Sahil Shrivastav
- Pari Tonk as Mahi Das
- Chandsi Kataria as Naina Marathe
- Naved Aslam as DCP Deepak Rathi
- Mukul Chadda as Bheesham Das
- Kabir Kachroo as Ojas Adhikari
- Anmol Rawat as Aarav Tripathi
- Atiya Tara Nayak as Lavanya Sawant
- Madhurima Ghosh as Supriya
- Sagar Deshmukh as Uddhav Marathe
- Abhishek Bhalerao as Constable Sunil Singh

== Release ==
It was released on 10 October 2025. The official trailer was unveiled on 25 September 2025.

== Reception ==
Shubhra Gupta of The Indian Express gave 2.5 stars out of 5 and said that "Konkona Sen Sharma fronts classic conflict of a whodunit with domestic and professional pushes and pulls in play, even as murky details which shaped the crime begin emerging." Anurag Singh Bohra of India Today gave it 3 stars out of 5 and stated that "'Search: The Naina Murder Case' is a must-watch for cinephiles who like to study not just cinema, but also the versatility of actors like Konkona. It is also meant for those craving the human element and complex characters in crime-thrillers." Abhimanyu Mathur of Hindustan Times rated it 3/5 stars and said that "Konkona Sen Sharma's acting is one of the highlights of this gripping but uneven show."

Archika Khurana of The Times of India rated it 3/5 stars and observed that "A well-acted, atmospheric whodunit that grips in parts but leaves you wanting more." Nandini Ramnath of Scroll.in observed that "Search frustratingly turns off the tap just when the flow is the strongest, ending on a cliffhanger after six episodes. This ploy to keep viewers hooked interrupts the momentum that has been steadily building up. Fortunately, Search has enough reserve fuel to resume the journey." Rahul Desai of The Hollywood Reporter India commented that "The six-episode police procedural suffers from all the symptoms of the Indian Remake Syndrome."

Arkadev Ghoshal of Deccan Herald rated it 2/5 stars and siad that "The series is a lukewarm execution. It manages to deliver a balanced narrative, with the execution partly rising beyond the average police procedural." Divya Nair of Rediff.com gave 3.5 stars out of 5 and stated that "In just five tightly packed episodes, Search: The Naina Murder Case takes you through a whirlwind of theories, emotions and shocking revelations, making it a compelling Indian crime drama." Yatamanyu Narain of News 18 rated it 3/5 stars and said that "Search: The Naina Murder Case is gripping and intriguing in parts, enriched by strong performances and an intelligent premise, but it never quite achieves the narrative cohesion it strives for." Lachmi Deb Roy of Firstpost gave 3.5 stars out of 5 and writes in her review that "Search: The Naina Murder Case is immersive and engaging. Most importantly even though it is a series with all its twists and turns, it is crisp." Aishwarya Vasudevan of OTT Play rated it 3/5 stars and said that "This Indian adaptation of Nordic noir The Killing is a mixed bag. Konkona Sen Sharma is brilliant as the lead detective, but the plot is overstuffed with suspects and remains frustratingly unresolved." Subhash K Jha of News 24 4 stars out of 5 and writes that "The narration is pacy but never out of breath. What really elevates the show are the performances.

Kavitha Shanmugam of The Federal praised Konkona's performance in the series and commented "Konkona Sen Sharma shines in watchable desi noir".

== Episodes ==
=== Series overview ===
Season	Episodes	Originally released	
Season	Episodes	First released	Network
1	6	October 10, 2025	JioHotstar

=== Season 1 (2025) ===
No. in season	Title	Directed by	Written by	Original release date
1	"Skeletons in the Closet"	Rohan Sippy	Anuya Jakatdar, Girish Joshi	October 10, 2025
2	"Writing on the Wall"	Rohan Sippy	Anuya Jakatdar, Girish Joshi	October 10, 2025
3	"Et Tu, Brute?"	Rohan Sippy	Anuya Jakatdar, Girish Joshi	October 10, 2025
4	"End of the Rope"	Rohan Sippy	Anuya Jakatdar, Girish Joshi	October 10, 2025
5	"Devil in the Details"	Rohan Sippy	Anuya Jakatdar, Girish Joshi	October 10, 2025
6	"Cat and Mouse"	Rohan Sippy	Anuya Jakatdar, Girish Joshi	October 10, 2025
