= Sofie Gråbøl =

Danish actress (born 1968)

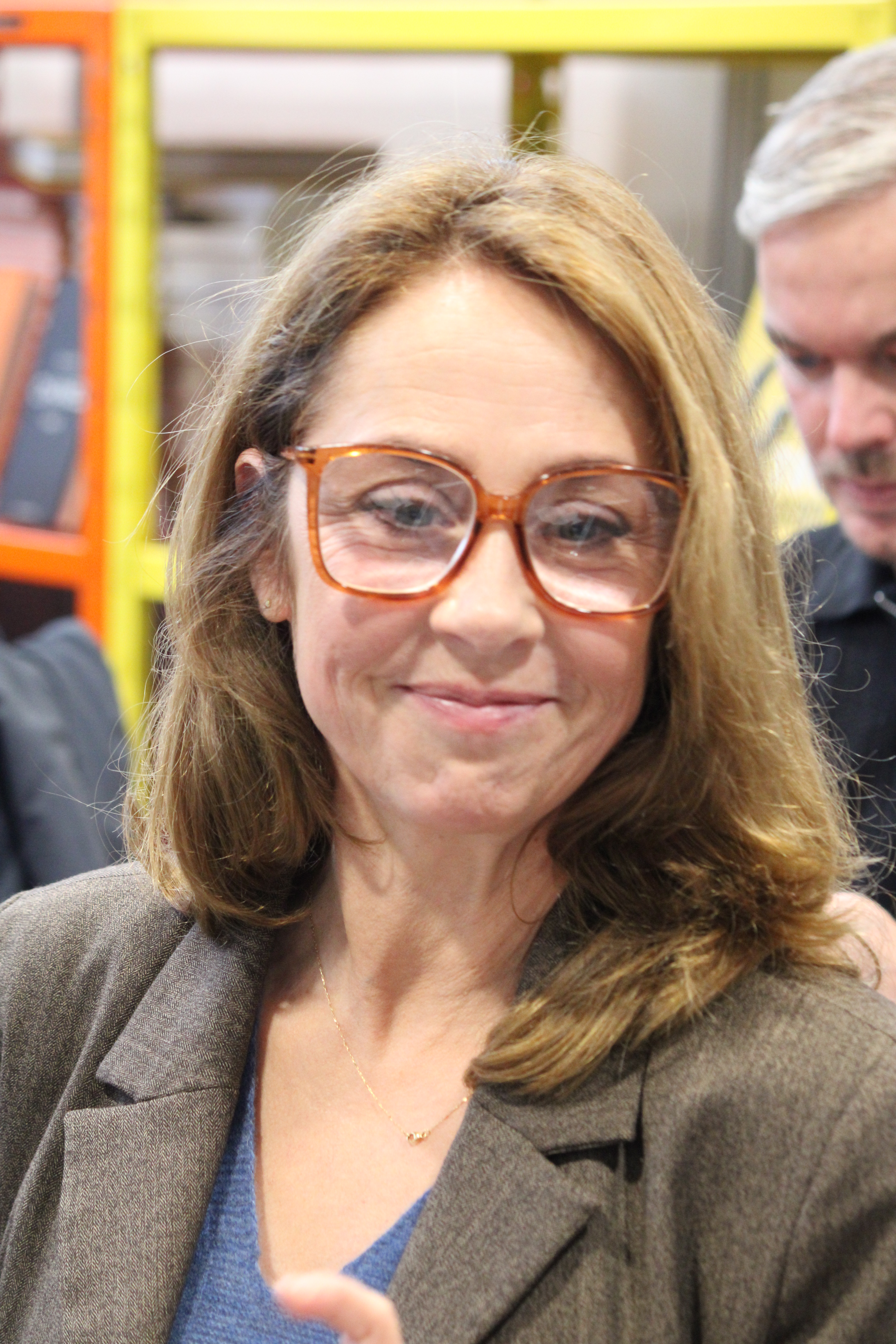
- Gråbøl in 2025
- Born: 30 July 1968 (age 58); Frederiksberg, Denmark
- Occupation: Actor
- Years active: 1986–present
- Known for: Detective Sarah Lund in Forbrydelsen
- Spouse: Jacob Thuesen (div. 2006)
- Children: 2
- Awards: 5 Robert Awards; 2 Bodil Awards; BAFTA Award; Nominated for International Emmy Award (2008); Nordic Language Prize (2018)

Sofie Gråbøl (Danish pronunciation: [sofiˀə ˈkʁʌpøl]; born 30 July 1968) is a Danish actress. She had her breakthrough role in the 1986 Danish film Early Spring, directed by Astrid Henning-Jensen, playing the lead role in the film version of Tove Ditlevsen's novel Barndommens gade when she was 17 years old. On television she has starred in Taxa and Nikolaj og Julie.

Gråbøl has become known in Denmark for playing emotional roles, but she achieved international fame as a detective—the cool and distant lead character Inspector Sarah Lund in all three series of The Killing (Danish: Forbrydelsen). In the UK it was broadcast on BBC4 with great success, winning a BAFTA award, and bringing Gråbøl celebrity status.

== Early life and education ==
Sofie Gråbøl was born on 30 July 1968 in Frederiksberg, Denmark. Both her parents, father Kaj Fladhede Gråbøl and mother Mette Koustrup, were architects. She has an older brother, Niels Gråbøl, who is a director and the ex-husband of actress Ditte Gråbøl. Gråbøl's father left her mother when her mother was pregnant with Gråbøl. She was brought up by her mother. Her mother remarried to a Maoist architect and for a time they lived in a commune.

== Career ==
=== Early career ===
In the early years of her career, Gråbøl studied theology and worked in a bookstore. Responding to a newspaper advertisement at the age of 17, she was given the role of an artist's nude model in Oviri, a 1986 film about Paul Gauguin with Donald Sutherland. Despite having had no formal training, and entering acting only on the encouragement of her mother, she has worked continuously since then.

Her breakthrough role was in the 1986 Danish film directed by Astrid Henning-Jensen, Early Spring.

=== The Killing (2007–2012) ===
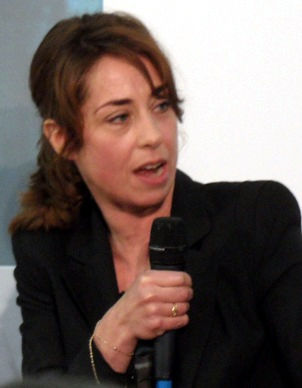
Gråbøl in 2011

In 2007, Gråbøl portrayed the role of police Detective Sarah Lund, obsessed with solving the sadistic killing of a schoolgirl in the Danish television series The Killing (Danish: Forbrydelsen, literally "The Crime"). Producers of the show envisioned breaking the clichés of female characters usually portrayed on television and film. Lund was to be a driven and relentless detective without her primary concern being for her physical appearance or sexuality.

Gråbøl was involved early on in the development process of the series and had numerous discussions with writer and series creator Søren Sveistrup. Her input was integral to the creation of the character, from keeping the character's past a mystery to the choice of clothing, and especially that the character was to be emotionally isolated. At one point, the writers were considering having Lund have an affair with one of the suspects. She fought this plot line, explaining that Lund was a female Clint Eastwood, and it was removed. It was originally intended that Sarah Lund should die, but this was changed halfway through the series. Gråbøl had become known in Denmark for playing emotional characters, and the role of the cool and distant Lund was a stark departure.

The series was a huge success in Denmark, with over half the population watching. Although already well known in Denmark, Gråbøl now found herself stopped on the street as fans of the show wanted to know the secret of the killer. The series was then played throughout Europe. With the show's success, it played in back-to-back weekend installments in the UK on BBC4. With no promotion, the show became a word-of-mouth success and even topped Mad Men in the ratings.

Gråbøl had been a famous actress in Denmark for 25 years when she suddenly, to her surprise, achieved cult status in Britain. Even the shape-concealing jumper (sweater) she wore in the show became iconic. She received requests for interviews and offers to work in Britain, most of which she had to decline due to her busy work schedule. However, she had a cameo in the BBC comedy Absolutely Fabulous playing her character Detective Lund. In the UK, Gråbøl was named Best Actress at the Crime Thriller Awards, and the show won the 2011 BAFTA for Best International TV Show. The BAFTA was awarded to Gråbøl, creator and writer Søren Sveistrup, producer Piv Bernth and director Birger Larsen.

In Britain, the series had subtitles, but for the American audience it was remade. Commenting on the first series of The Killing remake, while saying she thought the American version was good, Gråbøl said it was unfortunate that American audiences would not accept shows with subtitles because with the success of the show in Britain, "there's a strong sense of a cultural exchange going on. By watching each other's stories, you exchange something very valuable. It's about language and culture and the ways of looking at life." In series two of the American version, Gråbøl has a small part as a Seattle district attorney. In July 2012, the US remake was cancelled by the network.

Forbrydelsen II was released in 2009, and Forbrydelsen III was released in 2012.

=== 2012–present ===
Gråbøl was diagnosed with breast cancer in December 2012, for which she underwent surgery and chemotherapy. She temporarily retired from acting in 2013, but returned to work the next year, appearing as Hildur Odegard, a Norwegian mayor, in two series of the British TV series Fortitude.

In August 2014, she made her English-language début on stage in Edinburgh, appearing as Margaret of Denmark in James III: The True Mirror, the third of Rona Munro's historical trilogy The James Plays.

In 2015, she appeared along with Swedish actress Frida Farrell in the music video for the song "Under the Make-up" by the Norwegian band A-ha. It was released on 24 August 2015.

In 2018, she was awarded the Nordic Language Prize in Oslo, Norway for her contribution to positive attitudes between neighboring Nordic languages.

In 2019, she played Queen Marie of Denmark in the British period drama series Gentleman Jack, and in 2020 as prosecution lawyer Catherine Stamper in HBO's The Undoing, alongside Nicole Kidman and Hugh Grant.

Gråbøl starred as prison guard Miriam in the six-part 2023 Danish crime drama series Prisoner (Danish title: Huset). The series was created by Kim Fupz Aakeson, and directed and co-created by Michael Noer and Frederik Louis Hviid. The series has been acquired by the BBC. It was released on public television streaming service SBS On Demand in December 2023.

== Personal life ==
As of 2012, Gråbøl had lived in Copenhagen all her life.

Gråbøl divorced her husband, the film director Jacob Thuesen, in 2006. They have two children, a son and a daughter.

In 2012, she was diagnosed with cancer, had surgery and chemotherapy, and was in remission in 2014.

== Theatre ==
Year	Title	Role	Company	Director	Notes
2014	James III: The True Mirror	Margaret of Denmark	National Theatre of Scotland	Laurie Sansom	Edinburgh International Festival production of the play by Rona Munro

== Filmography ==
=== Film ===
Key
†	Denotes productions that have not yet been released

Year	Title	Role	Notes
1986	The Wolf at the Door	Judith Molard	Original title: Oviri
1986	Early Spring	Ester	Original title: Barndommens gade
1987	Sorgagre	Ungfruen	TV film
1987	Pelle the Conqueror	Jomfru Sine	
1987	Vi svarer ikke for bølgerne	Pedestrian	TV film
1988	Rami og Julie	Julie	
1988	Jorden er giftig	Signe	Short
1991	Høfeber	Bankass	
1992	The Silent Touch	Annette Berg	Original title: Dotkniecie reki
1993	De skrigende halse	Anita Schulz	TV film
1993	Black Harvest	Clara Uldahl-Ege	Original title: Sort høst
1993	Tvangsritualer	Sofie Gråbøl	Short
1994	Nightwatch	Kalinka	Original title: Nattevagten
1995	Carmen & Babyface	Carmen	
1995	Pan	Edvarda Mack	Alternative title: Two Green Feathers
1996	Groovy days	Anne	Original title: Fede tider
1996	Den store Kul-Tur	Maibrit	TV film
1997	Sinan's Wedding	Cherie	Original title: Sinans bryllup
1997	Credo	Mona	Original title: "Sekten"
1997	Isle of Darkness	Julie	Original title: Mørkets øy
1998	H.C. Andersen's The Long Shadow	Louise	Voice role, Original title: H.C. Andersen og den skæve skygge
1999	Mifunes sidste sang	Claire	
1999	The One and Only	Mulle	Original title: Den eneste ene
1999	En sjælden fugl	Astrid	Short
2000	Flickering Lights	Hanne	Original title: Blinkende Lygter
2000	Gengangere	Regine	TV film
2001	Grev Axel	Leonora Amalie	
2002	The Life Insurance	Judith	Short, Original title: Livsforsikringen
2004	Aftermath	Britt Lehmann	Original title: Lad de små børn
2005	Accused	Nina	Original title: Anklaget
2005	True Spirit	Lærke	Original title: Den rette ånd
2006	The Boss of It All	Kisser	Original title: Direktøren for det hele
2007	The Substitute	Carls Mor	Original title: Vikaren
2007	Daisy Diamond	Sofie Gråbøl	
2013	The Hour of the Lynx	Helen	Original title: I lossens time
2013	IRL: In Real Life	Mille	Original title: Det andet liv
2016	The Day Will Come	Lærer Lilian	Original title: Der kommer en dag
2018	The House That Jack Built	Lady 3	
2018	That Time of Year	Barbara	Original title: Den tid på året
2018	X & Y	Sofie	
2019	Resin	Maria Haarder	Original title: Harpiks
2021	Wild Men	Anne	Original title: Vildmænd
2021	The Venus Effect	Gitte	Original title: Venuseffekten
2022	Attachment	Chana	
2022	Rose	Inger	
2025	The Last Viking	Margrethe	Original title: Den sidste viking
2026	What Lies Between Us	Sarah	

=== Television ===
Year	Title	Role	Notes
1990	Kära farmor	Younger Dagmar	Miniseries
1999	Taxa	Anna Sander	7 episodes
2002–2003	Nikolaj og Julie	Julie Krogh Andersen	Series regular
2007–2012	The Killing	Sarah Lund	Series regular, Original title: "Forbrydelsen"
2011	Absolutely Fabulous	Sarah Lund	Episode: "Identity"
2012	The Killing	District Attorney Christina Nielsen	Episode: "My Lucky Day"
2015–2018	Fortitude	Governor Hildur Odegard	Series regular
2016	The Other World	Dronningen	Series regular, Original title: "Den anden verden"
2018	Liberty	Kirsten	Miniseries
2018	The Restaurant	Henriette Winter	4 episodes, Original title: "Vår tid är nu"
2019	Gentleman Jack	Queen Marie	Episode: "Are You Still Talking"
2020	Us	Freja	Miniseries
2020	The Undoing	Catherine Stamper	Miniseries
2022	The Shift	Ella	Series regular, Original title: "Dag & nat"
2023	Prisoner	Miriam	Series regular; original title: Huset
2026	The Chestnut Man	Marie Holst	Main cast

== Awards and nominations ==
Year	Award	Category	Work	Result
1987	Robert Awards	Best Actress in a Supporting Role	The Wolf at the Door	Won
1987	Bodil Awards	Best Actress in a Supporting Role	The Wolf at the Door	Won
1994	Robert Awards	Best Actress in a Leading Role	Black Harvest	Won
1994	Bodil Awards	Best Actress in a Leading Role	Black Harvest	Won
1999	Fantaspoa International Fantastic Film Festival	Best Actress	Credo	Won
2000	Robert Awards	Best Actress in a Supporting Role	The One and Only	Won
2000	Bodil Awards	Best Actress in a Supporting Role	The One and Only	Nominated
2002	Robert Awards	Best Actress in a Leading Role	Grev Axel	Nominated
2003	Copenhagen TV Festival	Best Actress	Nikolaj og Julie	Won
2005	Robert Awards	Best Actress in a Leading Role	Aftermath	Won
2005	Bodil Awards	Best Actress in a Leading Role	Aftermath	Nominated
2006	Robert Awards	Best Actress in a Leading Role	Accused	Won
2006	Bodil Awards	Best Actress in a Leading Role	Accused	Nominated
2008	International Emmy Awards	Best Actress	The Killing	Nominated
2010	Golden Nymph Awards	Outstanding Actress in a Drama Series	The Killing	Won
2011	Crime Thriller Awards	Best Leading Actress	The Killing	Won
2011	BAFTA Television Awards	Best International Programme (with Søren Sveistrup, Piv Bernth & Birger Larsen)	The Killing	Won
2012	Crime Thriller Awards	Best Leading Actress	The Killing	Nominated
2012	BAFTA Television Awards	Best International Programme (with Søren Sveistrup, Piv Bernth & Kristoffer Nyholm)	The Killing	Nominated
2013	Crime Thriller Awards	Best Leading Actress	The Killing	Nominated
2013	Robert Awards	Best Actress in a Leading Television Role	The Killing	Won
2013	Golden Nymph Awards	Outstanding Actress in a Drama Series	The Killing	Won
2014	Robert Awards	Best Actress in a Leading Role	The Hour of the Lynx	Nominated
2014	Bodil Awards	Best Actress in a Leading Role	The Hour of the Lynx	Nominated
2017	Robert Awards	Best Actress in a Supporting Role	The Day Will Come	Won
2017	Robert Awards	Best Actress in a Supporting Television Role	The Other World	Nominated
2017	Bodil Awards	Best Actress in a Supporting Role	The Day Will Come	Nominated
2019	Robert Awards	Best Actress in a Supporting Role	That Time of Year	Nominated
2019	Robert Awards	Best Actress in a Supporting Television Role	Liberty	Nominated
2019	Bodil Awards	Best Actress in a Supporting Role	That Time of Year	Nominated
2022	Bodil Awards	Best Actress in a Supporting Role	The Venus Effect	Nominated
2023	Bodil Awards	Best Actress in a Leading Role	Rose	Won
2023	Robert Awards	Best Actress in a Leading Role	Rose	Nominated
2024	Robert Awards	Best Actress in a Leading Television Role	Prisoner	Won
