= The Good Traitor =

- Film poster
- Danish: Vores mand i Amerika
- Directed by: Christina Rosendahl
- Written by: Kristian Bang Foss; Dunja Gry Jensen; Christina Rosendahl
- Starring: Ulrich Thomsen
- Release date: 13 August 2020
- Running time: 115 minutes
- Country: Denmark
- Languages: Danish; English
- Box office: $11,274

The Good Traitor (Danish: Vores mand i Amerika, "Our Man in America") is a 2020 Danish drama film about Henrik Kauffmann and the signing of the Greenland treaty with the United States after the Nazi occupation of Denmark during World War II.

== Cast ==
- Ulrich Thomsen as Henrik Kauffmann
- Denise Gough as Charlotte Kauffmann
- Mikkel Boe Følsgaard as Povl Bang-Jensen
- Zoë Tapper as Zilla Sears
- Burn Gorman as Berle
- Henry Goodman as Franklin D. Roosevelt
- Esben Dalgaard Andersen as Einar Blechingberg
- Ross McCall as Mason Sears
- Pixie Davies as Poppin Sears
- Amber Fernée as Tilda Kauffmann
- Rosemary Aburrow as Lisa Kauffmann
- Søren Sætter-Lassen as Nils Svenningsen
- Nicholas Blane as Winston Churchill
- Miri-Ann Beuschel as Lauring
- Henrik Noël Olesen as Arno
- Hans Henrik Clemensen as Statsminister Buhl
- Scott Alexander Young as General Hobbs
- Robert Jackson as Real Estate Agent

== Reception ==
On review aggregator website Rotten Tomatoes, The Good Traitor holds an approval rating of 44% based on 16 reviews. The New York Times complimented, The Good Traitor "shows how the energies of public and private worlds course back and forth". Variety was less complimentary, "Fascinating backroom politics circa WWII are undermined by banal marital melodrama in Danish director Christina Rosendahl's The Good Traitor, resulting in a so-so period drama that raises more questions than it answers."
