= Cyron Melville =

Danish actor and musician (born 1984)

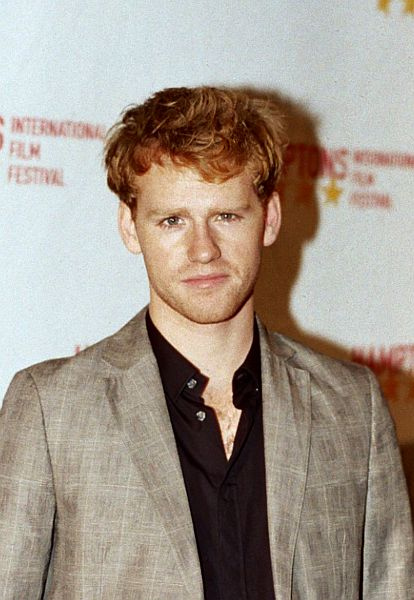
- Born: 1 July 1984 (age 40); Djursland, Denmark
- Other names: Cyron Bjørn Melville
- Occupation(s): Actor, musician
- Years active: 1995–present
- Height: 1.81 m (5 ft 11 1/2 in)

Cyron Bjørn Melville (born 1 July 1984) is a Danish actor and musician.

== Early life ==
Melville was born in Djursland, Denmark, to Scottish comedian Johnny Melville and Dane Elizabeth Bjørn Nielsen.

== Career ==
At the age of ten, Melville gained his first lead role as Frederik in The Beast Within, a feature drama written and directed by Carsten Rudolf. As child actor he has since appeared in several local movies and TV series such as Hallo det er jul, Kik'n Rush and Jul i Valhal.

In Denmark, his fame was cemented after playing Oliver Schandorff in the Emmy-nominated local series The Killing. For his supporting role in Natasha Arthy's Fighter, Melville was nominated at the Bodil Awards 2008 and as Idol of the Year at the Boogie Awards. A year after he won the Shooting Stars Award at the Berlin International Film Festival.

In 2009, Melville received an award as Best Actor at the Marrakech International Film Festival and at the Montreal World Film Festival for his performance in Danish movie Love and Rage produced by Zentropa. The same role of Daniel earned him multiple nominations at Bodil Awards 2010, at the Robert Awards and at the Zulu Awards.

In 2012 Melville is Enevold Brandt in the historical drama A Royal Affair. In the same year he starred in music videos In Love with the World by Aura Dione and Tomgang by Shaka Loveless.

Recently he joined the cast of Showtime period drama The Borgias, created by Neil Jordan and renewed for a third season in 2013.

In addition to his career as actor, Melville is a musician. From 2002 to 2006 was a drummer in Danish reggae band Bliglad.

== Personal life ==
Melville speaks Danish, English, Swedish and German.

== Filmography ==
Television
Year	Title	Role	Notes
1995	Hallo det er jul	Mads Jokumsen	
2005	Jul i Valhal	Balder	
2007	The Killing	Oliver Schandorff	
2008	Sommer	Eik	
2013	The Borgias	Cardinal Farnese	
2024	Those Who Kill	Jacob Østergaard	
Film
Year	Title	Role	Notes
1995	The Beast Within	Frederik Steppe Andersen	
2003	Kik'n Rush	Bo	
2006	Råzone	Nikolaj	
2006	Supervoksen (Triple Dare)	Adam	
2008	Fighter	Emil Andersen	Nominated—Bodil Award 2008 as Best Supporting Role
2009	Curse of the Seeress	King Valdemar	
2009	Love and Rage	Daniel	Won—Montreal World Film Festival Award as Best Actor; Won—Marrakech International Film Festival Award as Best Actor; Nominated—Bodil Award 2010 as Best Actor; Nominated—Robert Award as Best Actor; Nominated—Boogie Award as Best Actor
2012	A Royal Affair	Enevold Brandt	
2012	You & Me Forever	Mads	
2013	Nymphomaniac	A	
2014	Lev stærkt	Nikolaj	
2015	Sommeren '92	Brian Laudrup	
2018	Hypnose	Arto Halonen	
