= Walk with Me (2016 film) =

2016 film

- Danish theatrical poster
- Danish: De standhaftige
- Directed by: Lisa Ohlin
- Written by: Karina Dam
- Produced by: Per Holst
- Starring: Mikkel Boe Følsgaard; Cecilie Lassen
- Cinematography: Lars Skree
- Edited by: Anders Nylander
- Music by: Sebastian Öberg; Magnus Jarlbo; Louise Alenius
- Distributed by: SF Film A/S; TrustNordisk
- Release date: 7 April 2016
- Running time: 105 minutes
- Country: Denmark
- Language: Danish
- Box office: $246,799

Walk with Me (Danish: De standhaftige) is a 2016 Danish drama film directed by Lisa Ohlin. It was named as one of three films that could be chosen as the Danish submission for the Best Foreign Language Film at the 89th Academy Awards, but it was not selected.

== Cast ==
- Mikkel Boe Følsgaard as Thomas
- Cecilie Lassen as Sofie
- Karen-Lise Mynster as Ruth
- Silja Eriksen Jensen as Nina
- Morten Holst as Jimmy
- Dar Salim as Doctor
- Alban Lendorf as David
