= Johnny Melville =

Scottish actor, clown and mime (born 1948)

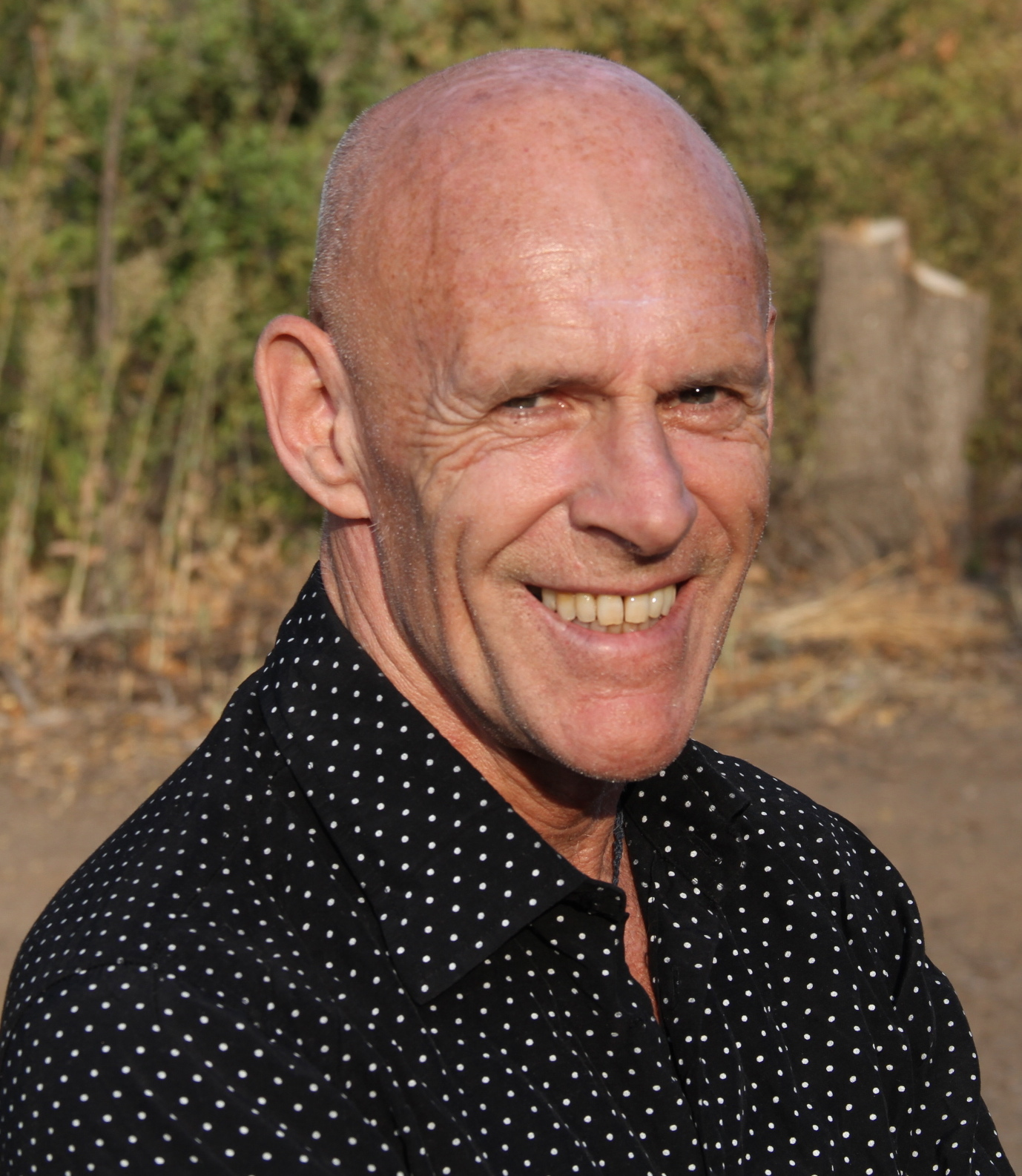
- The actor and clown Johnny Melville
- Born: John Melville; 27 February 1948 (age 77); Leith, Scotland, U.K.
- Occupation(s): Clown, actor, mime
- Years active: 1972 – present
- Children: Cyron Melville
- Website: johnnymelville.com

Johnny Melville (born 27 January 1948 in Leith, Scotland) is a clown, actor and mime who is part of the group of artists who in the 1970s revolutionized the world of the clown in Europe, alongside names including Jango Edwards and Nola Rae in the historic Friends Roadshow in Amsterdam. In recent years, he has combined his work as a clown, mime and trainer with that of actor in alternative filmmaking.

== Career ==
He began his professional career in 1972, working alongside names typical of the British theatre scene including David Aukin or John Bolton. Until 1977, he was an actor in and the director of the alternative-theater company Salakta Balloon Band, and later and until 1979 by the London theater company Kaboodle Theater.

However, it was in 1978 that he began his career as a soloist at the Festival of Fools, a career that screened him for all kinds of European festivals in Germany, the Netherlands, Austria, Denmark, France, Sweden, Italy, Japan, Russia, Canada (he performed twice at Montreal's Just for Laughs festival) and the United States, working both in performing and conducting shows. His popularity as a mime and clown was so great that in 1987 they spent a ten-day Johnny Melville Festival in Denmark, where Melville offered his last five shows.

Melville has also alternated his talent as a clown and mime with performances in short films, feature films, television series and television movies of all kinds and in multiple countries (mostly on the alternative-film circuit), but also in television advertising and even alongside trendy music groups, highlighting the collaboration he made with the Swiss electronic music band Yello in 1988.

As an actor he has worked under names including Vanna Paoli, Dieter Meier, Ricard Reguant, Antonio Chafrawias, Mario Orfini, Michael Knighton. In 2001, he won the Best Actor Award at the Brooklyn Film Festival in New York City for the film No Man's Land, directed by Nina Rosenmeier.

In recent years, he has combined his formative performances and workshops of mime, gesture and clown with the cinema, direction and writing of scripts, in addition to having made a leap to Latin American clown programs and festivals, visiting with some frequency Colombia, Brazil, Mexico or Chile.
