= The Chestnut Man =

Danish thriller television series

- Release poster
- Danish: Kastanjemanden
- Genre: Police procedural; Drama
- Created by: Dorte Warnøe Hagh; David Sandreuter; Mikkel Serup
- Based on: The Chestnut Man (Kastanjemanden) by Søren Sveistrup
- Developed by: Nina Quist; Marie Louise Siim
- Directed by: Kasper Barfoed; Mikkel Serup
- Starring: Danica Curcic; Mikkel Boe Følsgaard; David Dencik; Esben Dalsgaard Andersen; Iben Dorner; Lars Ranthe; Liva Forsberg; Louis Næss-Schmidt; Ali Kazim
- Composer: Kristian Eidnes Andersen
- Country of origin: Denmark
- Original language: Danish
- No. of seasons: 2
- No. of episodes: 12

Production
- Executive producers: Søren Sveistrup; Meta Louise Foldager Sørensen; Mikkel Serup
- Producers: Morten Kjems Hytten Juhl; Stine Meldgaard Madsen
- Production locations: Copenhagen, Denmark
- Cinematography: Sine Vadstrup Brooker; Louise McLaughlin
- Editors: Cathrine Ambus; Anja Farsig; Martin Schade; Lars Therkelsen
- Running time: 43–59 minutes
- Production company: SAM Productions

Original release
- Network: Netflix
- Release: 29 September 2021 – present

The Chestnut Man (Danish: Kastanjemanden) is a Danish crime series released on Netflix on 29 September 2021. The series was created by Dorte Warnøe Hagh, David Sandreuter, and Mikkel Serup, is directed by Kasper Barfoed and Mikkel Serup and is based on the book of the same name by Søren Sveistrup. The series stars Danica Curcic and Mikkel Boe Følsgaard as Naia Thulin and Mark Hess, who investigate the dismemberment and murders of several mothers in Copenhagen by a serial killer who leaves figurines made of chestnuts at the crime scenes. The series was renewed for a second season in 2024, adding Sofie Gråbøl and Katinka Lærke Petersen to the cast. It premiered on 7 May 2026, under the title The Chestnut Man: Hide and Seek.

== Synopsis ==
The Chestnut Man opens with the discovery of the murder of an entire family on an isolated farm in 1987. More than thirty years later, in present-day Copenhagen, a young woman is found murdered in a playground, her left eye cut out and one of her hands missing. Detective Naia Thulin is assigned to the case. With her reluctant new partner, Mark Hess, they notice a tiny figurine made of chestnuts lying next to the body. A mysterious piece of evidence is soon discovered on the chestnut man—the fingerprint of a missing girl, the daughter of politician Rosa Hartung.

== Cast and characters ==
- Danica Curcic as Naia Thulin, an investigator with the Copenhagen police
- Mikkel Boe Følsgaard as Mark Hess, an investigator from Europol who temporarily returns to Copenhagen
- David Dencik as Simon Genz, a forensics worker with the Copenhagen police and close friend of Thulin and Hess
- Lars Ranthe as Nylander, Thulin's boss
- Iben Dorner as Rosa Hartung, the Danish Minister of Social Affairs, whose daughter Kristine has disappeared
- Esben Dalgaard Anderssen as Steen Hartung, Rosa's husband
- Liva Forsberg as Le Thulin
- Louis Næss-Schmidt as Gustav Hartung
- Ali Kazim as Nehru
- Anders Hove as Aksel
- Elliott Crosset Hove as Linus Bekker
- Sofie Gråbøl as Marie Holst (season 2)
- Katinka Lærke Petersen as Sandra Lindstrøm (season 2)

== Episodes ==
Season	Title	Episodes	Originally released	Network
1	The Chestnut Man	6	29 September 2021	Netflix
2	Hide and Seek	6	7 May 2026	Netflix

=== Season 1 (2021) ===
No. overall	No. in season	Title	Directed by	Written by	Original release date
1	1	"Episode 1"	Mikkel Serup	Dorte Warnøe Høgh, David Sanderuter, Søren Sveistrup, Christoffer Örnfelt, Elsebeth Nielsen	29 September 2021
In 1987, police officer Marius Larsen searches the Ørum family residence, where he discovers almost all members dead. He only finds the youngest son and the daughter alive in a room filled with chestnut men, but is killed by an unknown assailant. In present-day Copenhagen, investigator Naia Thulin and Europol investigator Mark Hess investigate the murder of dentist Laura Kjær, which involves a small chestnut figurine left at the scene. The victim's young son, Magnus, at home when his mother was killed, survives. Minister of Social Affairs Rosa Hartung returns to work after being on leave following the disappearance of her daughter, Kristine. Thulin's boss, Nylander, wants them to find evidence against Kjær's fiancé, Hans Henrik Hauge, for the murder, and they discover Kristine's fingerprints on the chestnut man. Thulin and Hess learn that Kristine sold chestnut figurines on the street.
2	2	"Episode 2"	Mikkel Serup	Dorte Warnøe Høgh, David Sanderuter, Søren Sveistrup, Christoffer Örnfelt	29 September 2021
Hess decides to reopen the Kristine Hartung case himself. He eventually gets Thulin and Genz on board with him. Rosa Hartung talks to opposition member Gert Bukke about cooperation regarding policies for children's care. She also conducts an interview to present the new policies, eventually convincing Bukke. Thulin questions Kristine's alleged killer, Linus Bekker, who successfully recollects the murder but is unable to remember where the body is hidden. The police arrest Erik Sejer-Lassen after an anonymous message sent to Laura Kjær's phone comes back to him. His wife, Anne, is attacked by the killer and chased into the woods just before the police arrive. She is found dead, with both hands severed. Hartung faces a new threat when her ministerial car is spray-painted, and eventually agrees to have bodyguards. A reluctant Nylander informs the Hartungs about Kristine's fingerprints but discloses there is no evidence to suggest she is alive. Hess and Thulin revisit the Kjær house, and Hess discovers mysterious drawings left by Magnus. He further ventures to the basement of an adjacent building, where he is attacked by an unknown assailant and locked in. The assailant is revealed to be Hans Henrik Hauge, whom Thulin attempts to arrest, and has him release Hess. However, Hauge manages to get away.
3	3	"Episode 3"	Mikkel Serup	Dorte Warnøe Høgh, David Sanderuter, Søren Sveistrup, Christoffer Örnfelt	29 September 2021
Thulin and Hess recover from Hauge's attack and the police look into his computer, where they discover footage of him exploiting Magnus. Steen Hartung decides to look into Kristine's case again despite heavy protests from Rosa. He goes as far as doing an interview on live television, expressing hope that Kristine could still be alive. Thulin and Hess confront Erik Sejer-Lassen with evidence of abuse of his daughters. Thulin and Hess learn that both Kjær and Sejer-Larsen were reported by an anonymous person to be bad parents and conclude that whoever received such a report could be the next victim. They suspect a woman named Kvium will be the next victim and commence an operation to catch the killer in the act. They capture Nikolaj Møller instead, a parent from Kvium's daughter's school, with whom she is having an affair. Møller reveals he was blackmailed with footage about the affair, presumably sent by the killer. While Kvium is in protective custody at a safe house, a car alarm distracts the last guard and she is locked outside after checking on him. By the time Thulin, Hess, Nylander, and the remaining units arrive at the safe house, Kvium is already dead, hanging from a tree, with both hands and one foot missing.
4	4	"Episode 4"	Kasper Barfoed	Dorte Warnøe Høgh, David Sanderuter, Søren Sveistrup, Christoffer Örnfelt	29 September 2021
Hess looks through old archive footage from Kristine Hartung's murder scene, where he discovers another chestnut man. Rosa Hartung changes her stance on Steen and decides to support him. Thulin and Hess question Linus Bekker again after footage from the murder scene shows him being present when he claimed he was dumping Kristine's body. Fractures start to show in Bekker's alibi, and he reveals he knows who the killer is but refuses to tell them. Nylander allows them to question Rosa Hartung, and they ask to look into old relocation cases of children she dealt with during her tenure. Too late, they discover that Hartung's driver, Jacob Rasouli, and his girlfriend, Benedikte Skans, have kidnapped Gustav Hartung. Both of them had been relocated to foster homes and acted in revenge against Hartung. Their van is eventually found, but both are already dead, while Gustav is alive. Hess suspects that Skans didn't kill herself and Rasouli in a murder-suicide. Thulin discovers severed body parts in a freezer belonging to Rasouli and Skans, whereupon Nylander closes the case.
5	5	"Episode 5"	Kasper Barfoed	Dorte Warnøe Høgh, David Sanderuter, Søren Sveistrup, Christoffer Örnfelt	29 September 2021
In 1985, a young Rosa is told by her foster parents that they plan on adopting Toke and Astrid Bering, twins she has been playing with. In the present day, both Thulin and Hess prepare to move to their respective new jobs. Hess is sent crime scene photos from the Ørum residence as his flight to Bucharest is delayed. He then travels to Møn to speak to the lead investigator on the case, John Brink. He shows him archive footage from the crime scene and reveals that the Bering twins lived there up until the murders, that the Ørum family regularly abused them, and one of the few ways they could prevent this was to make chestnut men. Hess discovers that they were moved to Møn after previously living with the Petersen family, with their daughter Rosa. Hartung is put on a three-month leave by the Prime Minister and later discovers a group of chestnut men in her home. She receives a message from the killer, ordering her to meet in order to learn where her daughter is. Thulin and Genz investigate the different kinds of chestnuts that were placed at the previous crime scenes, deducing that two were different from the first. Hess and Brink visit Brink's sister, where Hess discovers some old photos from a class reunion, with the Bering twins in them. To his surprise, he deduces from a photo that Toke Bering is now Genz.
6	6	"Episode 6"	Kasper Barfoed	Dorte Warnøe Høgh, David Sanderuter, Søren Sveistrup, Christoffer Örnfelt	29 September 2021
Thulin and Genz arrive at an abandoned farm, where Thulin uncovers incriminating evidence on the killer. Genz reveals to her that he is in fact the killer and quickly subdues her before she can arrest him. Hess has Nylander order a search on Genz's properties, and they find a chestnut man in his lab. Hartung arrives later that night, and Genz invites her in to make chestnut men with a tied-up Thulin. Despite her efforts to demand to see Kristine, Genz refuses and stabs her in the hand before subduing her as well. Hess deduces Genz's location via the chestnut tree along the main road. Genz ties Hartung up and cuts one of her hands, intending to do more, but is interrupted when Hess arrives. Hess is subsequently also subdued by Genz, who then douses the house with gasoline, before setting it alight. Thulin escapes but is quickly recaptured by Genz. Hess frees Hartung and secures her hand with tape before they escape out the basement window. Thulin forces Genz's car to a stop as Hess arrives at the main road. When Genz attempts to run Hess over, Thulin swerves the car into a tree, throwing Genz out the driver's seat and impaling him on a nearby branch, leaving him dead in a similar manner to his victims. The police track down Genz's twin sister, Astrid, who resides in Germany. Together with German police, they arrest Astrid as an accomplice and find Kristine alive and well.

=== Season 2 ===
No. overall	No. in season	Title	Directed by	Written by	Original release date
7	1	"Episode 1"	Milad Alami	Dorte Warnøe Høgh, Emilie Lebech Kaae, Christian Bengtson, Søren Sveistrup	7 May 2026
8	2	"Episode 2"	Milad Alami	Dorte Warnøe Høgh, Emilie Lebech Kaae, Christian Bengtson, Søren Sveistrup	7 May 2026
9	3	"Episode 3"	Milad Alami	Dorte Warnøe Høgh, Emilie Lebech Kaae, Christian Bengtson, Søren Sveistrup	7 May 2026
10	4	"Episode 4"	Roni Ezra	Dorte Warnøe Høgh, Emilie Lebech Kaae, Christian Bengtson, Søren Sveistrup	7 May 2026
11	5	"Episode 5"	Roni Ezra	Dorte Warnøe Høgh, Emilie Lebech Kaae, Christian Bengtson, Søren Sveistrup	7 May 2026
12	6	"Episode 6"	Roni Ezra	Dorte Warnøe Høgh, Emilie Lebech Kaae, Christian Bengtson, Søren Sveistrup	7 May 2026

== Development ==
On 19 August 2019, Netflix announced its second Danish series at the Copenhagen TV Festival. The Chestnut Man is based on the debut novel by award-winning writer Søren Sveistrup (The Killing) and the series debuted on Netflix worldwide.

== Reception ==
The first season of The Chestnut Man received generally favourable views from critics and holds a 100% rating on Rotten Tomatoes, based on nine critic reviews, with an average rating of 9.0/10. Critics have described the show as "gripping" and "gruesome", while others, like Verdens Gang, described it as a "perfected cliche", while also giving it a four out of six on a dice roll.
