= Summer of '92 =

- Film poster
- Directed by: Kasper Barfoed
- Written by: Kasper Barfoed; Anders Frithiof August
- Starring: Ulrich Thomsen; Henning Jensen; Mikkel Boe Følsgaard; Cyron Melville; Esben Smed Jensen
- Music by: Lorne Balfe; Jeppe Kaas
- Distributed by: SF Film
- Release date: 27 August 2015
- Running time: 93 minutes
- Country: Denmark
- Language: Danish

Summer of '92 (Danish: Sommeren '92) is a Danish sports comedy directed by Kasper Barfoed. The film is based on the 1992 UEFA European Football Championship, Denmark's greatest ever football triumph.

The team had qualified only after Yugoslavia was disqualified as a result of the breakup and warfare in that country. The film explores the often difficult relationship between coach Richard Møller Nielsen, the Danish Football Association and the team's leading players, which nevertheless led to triumph in 1992.

== Cast ==
- Ulrich Thomsen as Richard Møller Nielsen
- Henning Jensen as Kaj Johansen
- Mikkel Boe Følsgaard as Kim Vilfort
- Cyron Melville as Brian Laudrup
- Esben Smed Jensen as John 'Faxe' Jensen
- Gustav Dyekjær Giese as Peter Schmeichel
- Jon Lange as Kim Christofte
- Allan Hyde as Flemming Povlsen
- Lars Brygmann as Frits Ahlstrøm
- Birgitte Hjort Sørensen as Minna Vilfort
- Mads Moritzen Bak as Henrik Larsen
