= Love and Rage (2009 film) =

- Directed by: Morten Giese
- Starring: Cyron Melville; Sara Hjort Ditlevsen
- Release date: 31 July 2009
- Running time: 1h 34min
- Country: Denmark
- Language: Danish

Love and Rage (Danish: Vanvittig forelsket) is a 2009 Danish thriller film directed by Morten Giese.
