= The Kindness of Strangers (film) =

- Theatrical release poster
- Directed by: Lone Scherfig
- Written by: Lone Scherfig
- Produced by: Marlene Blenkov; Sandra Cunningham
- Starring: Zoe Kazan; Tahar Rahim; Esben Smed; Andrea Riseborough; Caleb Landry Jones
- Cinematography: Sebastian Blenkov
- Edited by: Cam McLauchlin
- Music by: Andrew Lockington
- Production companies: HanWay Films; Ingenious Media; Apollo Media; Creative Alliance; Strada Films; WDR
- Distributed by: Entertainment One (Canada); KinoVista (France); Alamode Film (Germany); SF Studios (Sweden); Blue Finch Film Releasing (United Kingdom); Vertical Entertainment (United States)
- Release dates: February 7, 2019 (Berlin); December 6, 2019 (Canada); February 14, 2020 (United States)
- Running time: 117 minutes
- Countries: Canada; France; Germany; Sweden; United Kingdom; United States
- Language: English
- Box office: $129,603

The Kindness of Strangers is a 2019 drama film written and directed by Lone Scherfig. The film stars Zoe Kazan, Tahar Rahim, Esben Smed, Andrea Riseborough, and Caleb Landry Jones.

The Kindness of Strangers had its world premiere at the Berlin International Film Festival on February 7, 2019, and was released in the United States on February 14, 2020, by Vertical Entertainment.

== Plot ==
Clara Scott lives in Buffalo, New York with her two sons, Anthony and Jude. Having endured an abusive marriage to her husband Richard, a police officer, Clara flees to New York City, taking Anthony and Jude with her under the guise of a "vacation".

In New York, Clara and the boys struggle with homelessness, often driving around in their car or relying on shoplifting to survive on the streets. They are eventually taken in by a nurse, Alice, who runs a local church and support group. Alice is a vocal supporter of homeless people, having befriended a boy named Jeff who had been fired from various employments before being evicted from his apartment.

During the night, a disoriented Jude collapses in the middle of a snowstorm, forcing him to be hospitalized. Clara is later taken in by ex-convict Marc, whom Anthony is hostile towards but eventually warms up to him. As it turns out, Anthony had uncovered a series of explicit crimes against women committed by Richard on his computer. With Marc's help, Clara hires a lawyer and Marc's friend John Peter to incriminate Richard. Meanwhile, Richard beats his father with a phone when he refuses to help him. Richard is later found guilty and sentenced to life imprisonment.

Despite having finally returned home, Jude's relationship with his mother is strained due to their time on the streets but eventually forgives her. As the film ends, Jeff is able to secure a job at a restaurant run by Marc's employer Timofrey.

== Cast ==
- Zoe Kazan as Clara Scott
- Tahar Rahim as Marc
- Esben Smed as Richard Scott
- Andrea Riseborough as Alice
- Caleb Landry Jones as Jeff
- Bill Nighy as Timofey
- Jay Baruchel as John Peter
- Jack Fulton as Anthony Scott
- Finlay Wojtak-Hissong as Jude Scott
- Nicolaj Kopernikus as Sergei
- Rodrigo Fernandez-Stoll as Laundry Worker #1

== Production ==
In February 2017, it was announced Lone Scherfig would direct the film, from a screenplay she wrote, with HanWay Films, Ingenious Media, Apollo Media, Creative Alliance, Strada Films, Telefilm Canada, Danish Film Institute, Nadcon, D'Artaganan, and Entertainment One serving as producers. In February 2018, Andrea Riseborough, Tahar Rahim, and Zoe Kazan joined the cast of the film. In March 2018, Bill Nighy, Caleb Landry Jones, and Jay Baruchel joined the cast of the film. In September 2018, it was announced the title was The Kindness of Strangers.

=== Filming ===
Principal photography began in March 2018, and took place in Toronto, Ontario, Canada, New York City, and Copenhagen, Denmark.

== Release ==
It had its world premiere at the Berlin International Film Festival on February 7, 2019. It was released in the United States on February 14, 2020, by Vertical Entertainment.

== Reception ==
According to the review aggregator website Rotten Tomatoes, 31% of critics have given the film a positive review based on 36 reviews, with an average rating of 4.3/10. The site's critical consensus reads, "A talented onscreen ensemble is done no favors by The Kindness of Strangers, which searches for meaning and comes up empty." Metacritic reports a score of 32 out of 100 based on 11 critics, indicating "generally unfavorable reviews".
