= The Wolf at the Door =

1986 Danish-French biographical drama film

- Directed by: Henning Carlsen
- Written by: Christopher Hampton
- Produced by: Henning Carlsen
- Starring: Donald Sutherland; Jean Yanne; Sofie Gråbøl; Ghita Nørby; Merete Voldstedlund; Fanny Bastien; Jørgen Reenberg; Henrik Larsen; Luis Rego; Max Von Sydow
- Cinematography: Mikael Salomon
- Edited by: Janus Billeskov Jansen
- Music by: Roger Bourland; Ole Schmidt
- Release date: 1986
- Running time: 100 minutes
- Languages: French; English
- Box office: $583,800

The Wolf at the Door (Danish: Oviri, French: Gauguin, le loup dans le soleil) is a 1986 Danish-French biographical drama film directed by Henning Carlsen. It is based on real life events of French artist Paul Gauguin, who was married to a Danish woman and lived in Copenhagen in the 1880s.

It was entered into the main competition at the 43rd Venice International Film Festival.

== Cast ==
- Donald Sutherland as Paul Gauguin
- Max von Sydow as August Strindberg
- Sofie Gråbøl as Judith Molard
- Jean Yanne as William Molard
- Valeri Glandut as Annah
- Ghita Nørby as Ida Molard
- Merete Voldstedlund as Mette Gad
- Fanny Bastien as Juliette Huet
- Jørgen Reenberg as Eduard Brandes
- Henrik Larsen as Julien Leclercq
- Yves Barsacq as Edgar Degas
