= Fightgirl Ayse =

Ayşe
- Directed by: Natasha Arthy
- Written by: Nikolaj Arcel; Natasha Arthy; Rasmus Heisterberg
- Produced by: Johnny Andersen
- Starring: Semra Turan
- Cinematography: Sebastian Winterø
- Edited by: Kasper Leick
- Music by: Frithiof Toksvig
- Distributed by: Sandrew Metronome
- Release date: 14 December 2007 (Denmark)
- Running time: 97 minutes
- Country: Denmark
- Languages: Danish; Turkish; German

Fighter Ayşe (also known as Fightgirl or Fighter) is a 2007 Danish drama action film directed by Natasha Arthy.

== Plot ==
Ayşe is a young woman in Copenhagen whose parents want her to attend medical school because they wish for her a future with proper health insurance and entitlement to a pension. They also like to make sure she finds an appropriate husband.

She on the other hand considers her parents somewhat square and has her own plans. She is dedicated to Kung Fu. As a martial arts adept she receives recognition for doing something she enjoys.

Her family and her would-be in-laws resent her commitment for an exotic contact sport which regularly includes combat with men. All of them are worried about her neglecting school and getting a shady reputation.

When she falls in love with a young fighter named Emil the chances for her marriage with the man of her family's choice start to fade away.

Still her kin hasn't given in. There is Omar, a friend of the family, who is even more traditional than all the others, joins her club. He challenges her, intending to prove that her training is a waste of time. Ayşe has to stand up against him.

== Cast ==
- Semra Turan as Ayşe Ahman
- Nima Nabipour as Ali Ahman
- Cyron Melville as Emil Andersen
- Molly Blixt Egelind as Sofie
- Sadi Tekelioglu as Ayşe's father
- Behruz Banissi as Omar Yüksel
- Xian Gao as Sifu
- Denize Karabuda as Ayşe's mother
- Ertugrul Yilan as Mehmet
- Özlem Saglanmak as Yasemin

== Reception ==
The film received positive reviews. It was especially appreciated for its handling of questions about cultural and personal identity Semra Turan's performance was praised.

== Accolades ==
Semra Turan was awarded as best actress at the 2008 Sitges Film Festival.

== See also ==
Yasemin
