= The Shift (TV series) =

Danish TV drama series

- Also known as: Dag & nat, Dag og natt
- Genre: Medical drama
- Created by: Lone Scherfig
- Written by: Lone Scherfig
- Directed by: Lone Scherfig, Søren Balle, Ole Christian Madsen
- Starring: Sofie Gråbøl; Pål Sverre Hagen; Marijana Jankovic; Sara Hjort Ditlevsen; Afshin Firouzi; Mattias Nordkvist
- Country of origin: Denmark
- Original language: Danish
- No. of seasons: 2
- No. of episodes: 16

Production
- Producer: Malene Blenkov
- Running time: 40–44 min
- Production company: Creative Alliance

Original release
- Network: TV 2
- Release: 29 May – 17 July 2022

The Shift or Dag & nat (literally Day & night) is a Danish television drama series, which was broadcast on TV 2 from 29 May 2022. It was created by Lone Scherfig, who also directed two episodes, while Søren Balle and Ole Christian Madsen directed three episodes, each. The first season of eight episodes is set in a short-staffed maternity ward of a hospital facing cutbacks. It stars Sofie Gråbøl as head midwife Ella, who is supported by obstetrician Jerry (Pål Sverre Hagen), midwife Louise (Marijana Jankovic), intern Tine (Sara Hjort Ditlevsen) and gynaecologist Milad (Afshin Firouzi). A second season, without Gråbøl, but with two new lead actors Anders W. Berthelsen as Lasse and Ann Eleonora Jørgensen as Linda, was filmed from November 2023. The action is set two years later in the same hospital's children's ward with broadcast due in 2024 or 2025.

== Premise ==
Ella is the dedicated head midwife on a respected maternity ward of a Danish hospital. Her team includes obstetrician Jerry, midwife Louise, intern Tine and gynaecologist Milad. Hospital administrator Michael declines Ella's requests for addtitional staff and orders cutbacks instead. This results in overworked staff, falling standards and problematic patient care.

== Cast and characters ==
- Sofie Gråbøl as Ella: head midwife
- Pål Sverre Hagen as Gjermund "Jerry": Norwegian-born obstetrics-surgeon, separated from wife
- Marijana Jankovic as Louise: midwife
- Sara Hjort Ditlevsen as Tine: intern midwife
- Afshin Firouzi as Milad: gynaecologist
- Mattias Nordkvist as Jacob: anaesthesiologist
- Mette Agnete Horn as Trille: healthcare worker
- Nicolai Jørgensen as Frederik Faaborg: intern anaesthesiologist
- Adam Brix as Michael: hospital administrator
- Birthe Neumann as Vivi
- Charlotte Munck as Marianne: midwife
- Patrick A. Hansen as Vilhelm: intern midwife
- Ole Opsal Stavrum as Torbjørn: Jerry's son
- Laura Ljungdahl as Benedikte: midwife
- Zelma Feldman Lewerissa as Tara
- Signe Thielsen as Aamina
- Marie-Lydie Melono Nokouda as Lily

== Production ==
Dag & nat was created, co-written and co-directed by Lone Scherfig for Danish television channel TV 2. Filming began in June 2021 with Sofie Gråbøl assigned the lead role of head midwife, Ella. Aside from Scherfig episodes are directed by Søren Balle or Ole Christian Madsen. It's produced by Malene Blenkov of Creative Alliance, which is co-owned by Madsen, Scherfig and Blenkov. Scenes were "was shot in a purpose-built set, and all artificial daylight... as naturalistic as possible". The first two episodes were previewed at Berlin Film Festival's Berlinale Series in February 2022. TV 2 broadcast all eight episodes from 29 May of that year.

For the second season, Gråbøl is replaced by two new lead actors Anders W. Berthelsen as Lasse and Ann Eleonora Jørgensen as Linda, which began filming in November 2023. The action is set two years later in the children's ward of the same hospital. It is expected to be broadcast in 2024 or 2025. According to TV 2's press release Lone Scherfig is joined by Nicholai Scherfig as the main writers. Lone and Madsen are joined by Henrik Ruben Genz as directors, while Blenkov returns as producer.

== Episode guide ==
=== Season one ===
.

No. in season	Title	Directed by	Written by	Original release date
1	"August" (August)	Søren Balle	Kim Fupz Aakeson, Lone Scherfig	29 May 2022
Ella collects her uniform, enters lift. She had scheduled meeting with Michael, who has now rescheduled as she approaches. They publicly argue about his cutbacks. He's dismissive of her staff's hard work, caring attitude. Ella, on ward, directs new patient to Trille: get registered. Ella sees Tine help patient, Laura through labour. Laura's experiencing pain, but wants natural childbirth. Ella holds morning briefing to inform staff of further cutbacks. She learns staff members are near breaking point. After Tine leaves, Ella attends Laura, providing pain relief; later delivers Laura's baby. Ella checks woman, Ayala, carrying twins; one twin requires rotating. Ella request Milad's advice regarding Caesarean. Another woman gives birth, but there are problems: Louise alerts Jerry. Trille suspects possibile fetal alcohol effects, advises the mother about raising her child. Jerry videophones Torbjørn. Ayala requires Caesarean, so Jerry operates. Ayala's twins are delivered safely. Laura's husband, Benjamin complains to Ella: Tine pressured Laura into natural childbirth. Ella decides to supervise Tine's shifts. Ella, Jerry have sex; Ella does not want deeper relationship. Tine meets Trille's patient, who asks Tine to thank Trille. Jerry apologises to Torbjørn for delay: he delivered twins. Ella's pregnant herself, checks fetal heartbeat.
2	"September" (September)	Søren Balle	Kim Fupz Aakeson, Lone Scherfig	5 June 2022
School bus accident: five injured children arrive at hospital; Jacob triages victims for emergency staff. Jerry treats injured child. Ella attends injured, pregnant teacher sends her to maternity. Teacher births her son; husband arrives. Ella to Milad: organise anonymous abortion. Ella receives official complaint. Ella admits doctor, Pernille, who carries stillborn fetus. Louise refuses to mentor Vilhelm. Teenage Bettina's pregnant with her second baby. Pernille request autopsy on fetus. Jacob, Frederick administer Bettina's epidural. Ella's mother enters ward, wants Ella to wear back brace. Ella alerts Jerry to stillborn: he's needed for autopsy. Trille measures Bettina's baby, which is being adopted. Ella delivers Pernille's stillborn, hands corpse to Jerry. Trille gives Bettina's baby to adoptive parents. Vilhelm recommends Pernille view her son, which she does. Later, Ella cries over stillborn, Jerry comforts her. Bettina sees adoptive parents leaving with child. Milad book abortion for Ella. Ella delivers complaint to Michael. Ella orders resistant Tine to go home, rest. She informs Tine of complaint against her.
3	"October" (Oktober)	Søren Balle	Lars K. Andersen, Lone Scherfig	12 June 2022
4	"November" (November)	Ole Christian Madsen	Lone Scherfig, Mette Sø	19 June 2022
5	"December" (December)	Ole Christian Madsen	Lone Scherfig, Mette Sø	26 June 2022
6	"January" (Januari)	Ole Christian Madsen	Lasse Kyed Rasmussen, Lone Scherfig	3 July 2022
7	"Day" (Dag)	Lone Scherfig	Lasse Kyed Rasmussen, Lone Scherfig	10 July 2022
8	"Night" (Nacht)	Lone Scherfig	Lone Scherfig, Jonas Wagner	17 July 2022
