= Esben Smed =

Danish actor (born 1984)

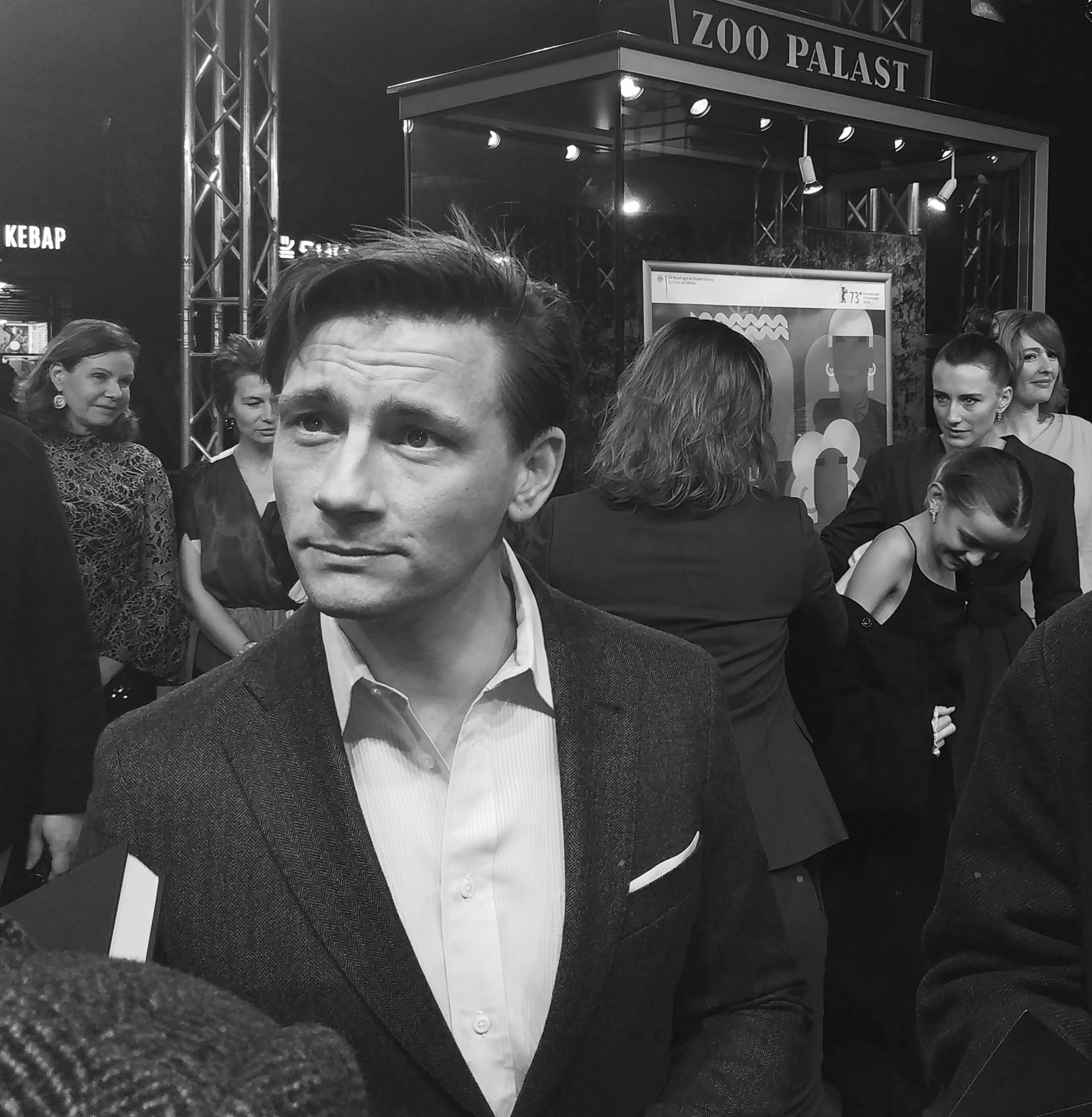
- premiere of the television series Agent at the Berlinale 2023
- Born: 13 July 1984 (age 41); Odder, Jutland, Denmark
- Occupation: Actor

Esben Smed (born 13 July 1984) is a Danish actor. He is best known for his roles in the films Sommeren '92 (2015), A Fortunate Man (2018), and Daniel (2019), as well as the television series Follow the Money (2016–2019).

== Filmography ==
=== Television ===
Year	Title	Role	Notes
2016–2019	Follow the Money	Nicky Rasmussen	
2024	Families like Ours	Nikolaj	

=== Film ===
Year	Title	Role	Notes
2003	Kick'n Rush	Mikkel	
2009	Aching Hearts	Leif	
2013	Sorrow and Joy	Klipperen	
2015	Jeanne d'Arc	Werner	short
2015	Sommeren '92	John "Faxe" Jensen	
2017	Letters for Amina	Janus	
2018	A Fortunate Man	Peter Andreas Sidenius	
2018	Ditte & Louise	Esben	
2019	Daniel	Daniel Rye	
2019	The Kindness of Strangers	Richard	
2022	The Kiss	Anton	

== Awards and nominations ==
Year	Award	Category	Nominated work	Result
2016	Bodil Awards	Best Actor in a Supporting Role	Sommeren '92	Nominated
2017	Berlin International Film Festival	Shooting Stars Award		Won
2017	Robert Awards	Best Actor in a Leading Television Role	Follow the Money	Won
2019	Robert Awards	Best Actor in a Leading Role	A Fortunate Man	Nominated
2020	Zulu Awards	Best Actor	A Fortunate Man, Daniel	Nominated
2020	Bodil Awards	Best Actor in a Leading Role	A Fortunate Man, Daniel	Nominated
2020	Robert Awards	Best Actor in a Leading Role	Daniel	Won
2020	Robert Awards	Best Actor in a Leading Television Role	Follow the Money, A Fortunate Man	Nominated
