= The Killing (Danish TV series) =

Danish police procedural TV series

- Series 1 Danish poster
- Danish: Forbrydelsen
- Literally: The Crime
- Genre: Crime drama; Psychological thriller; Mystery; Scandinavian noir
- Created by: Søren Sveistrup
- Starring: Sofie Gråbøl; Søren Malling; Mikael Birkkjær; Nikolaj Lie Kaas; Morten Suurballe
- Composer: Frans Bak
- Country of origin: Denmark
- Original language: Danish
- No. of series: 3
- No. of episodes: 40

Production
- Producers: Sandra Foss; Piv Bernth
- Running time: 50 minutes
- Production company: DR

Original release
- Network: DR1
- Release: 7 January 2007 – 25 November 2012

Related
- The Killing (American remake)

The Killing (Danish: Forbrydelsen, lit. 'The Crime') is a Danish police procedural drama television series created by Søren Sveistrup and produced by DR in co-production with ZDF Enterprises. It premiered on the Danish national television channel DR1 on 7 January 2007 and has since been broadcast in several other countries.

The series is set in Copenhagen and revolves around Detective Inspector Sarah Lund (Sofie Gråbøl). Each series follows a murder case. Each fifty-minute episode covers twenty-four hours of the investigation. The series is noted for its plot twists, season-long storylines and dark tone, and for giving equal emphasis to the stories of the murdered victim's family and the effect in political circles alongside the police investigation. It has also been singled out for the photography of its Danish setting and for the acting ability of its cast.

The Killing has proved to be an international success, particularly in the United Kingdom, Germany and the Netherlands, receiving numerous awards and nominations including a BAFTA Award and an International Emmy. It has become something of a cult show. Novelisations of each series have been published by Macmillan.

== Production ==
=== Development ===
Søren Sveistrup, series creator and head writer, worked closely with lead actress Sofie Gråbøl throughout the writing process to develop the character of Detective Inspector Sarah Lund. Gråbøl, in particular, became eager to defend her character. Gråbøl had a history of playing emotionally demonstrative characters on Danish television—she had worked with Sveistrup before on the TV-series Nikolaj og Julie. He approached her to play the part of Lund before work on the script began.

Torleif Hoppe was co-creator and a scriptwriter on more than 20 episodes. He later created the 2019 crime drama series DNA.

=== Filming ===
Despite her insistence that she play an "isolated person [who is] unable to communicate," Gråbøl initially found it difficult to strike the right balance for the emotionally-distant Lund. She came to realise that the only people she knew like that were men. As a result, she began "acting like a man" until the character took shape.

During filming of the first series, Sveistrup would not reveal major plot points or the identity of the murderer to members of the cast, including Gråbøl. The actors would receive the scripts on an episode-by-episode basis moments before shooting was scheduled to begin. Only Gråbøl was told that she was not the killer.

== Cast ==
Law enforcement personnel

- Sofie Gråbøl as Inspector Sarah Lund
- Morten Suurballe as Chief Inspector Lennart Brix
- Troels II Munk as Chief Inspector Erik Buchard
- Søren Malling as Inspector Jan Meyer
- Mikael Birkkjær as Inspector Ulrik Strange
- Lotte Andersen as VPD Ruth Hedeby
- Sigurd Holmen le Dous as Inspector Asbjørn Juncker

Series 1

- Lars Mikkelsen as Troels Hartmann
- Bent Mejding as Mayor Poul Bremer
- Marie Askehave as Rie Skovgaard
- Bjarne Henriksen as Theis Birk Larsen
- Ann Eleonora Jørgensen as Pernille Birk Larsen
- Nicolaj Kopernikus as Vagn Skærbæk
- Farshad Kholghi as Rama
- Michael Moritzen as Morten Weber
- Julie Ølgaard as Nanna Birk Larsen
- Cyron Melville as Oliver Schandorff

Series 2

- Nicolas Bro as Justice Minister Thomas Buch
- Kurt Ravn as Prime Minister Gert Grue Eriksen
- Flemming Enevold as Colonel Torsten Jarnvig
- Carsten Bjørnlund as Major Christian Søgaard
- Ken Vedsegaard as Sergeant Jens Peter Raben
- Stine Prætorius as Louise Raben
- Preben Kristensen as Carsten Plough
- Charlotte Guldberg as Karina Munk Jørgensen
- Jens Jacob Tychsen as Erling Krabbe
- Igor Radoslavjevic as Captain Said Bilal

Series 3

- Nikolaj Lie Kaas as Mathias Borch
- Anders W. Berthelsen as Robert Zeuthen
- Helle Fagralid as Maja Zeuthen
- Stig Hoffmeyer as Niels Reinhardt
- Olaf Johannessen as Prime Minister Kristian Kamper
- Jonatan Spang as Kristoffer "Stoffer" Kamper
- Trine Pallesen as Karen Nebel
- Tammi Øst as Birgit Eggert
- Peter Mygind as Deputy Public Prosecutor Tage Steiner
- Sara-Marie Maltha as Rosa Lebech

== Series 1 ==
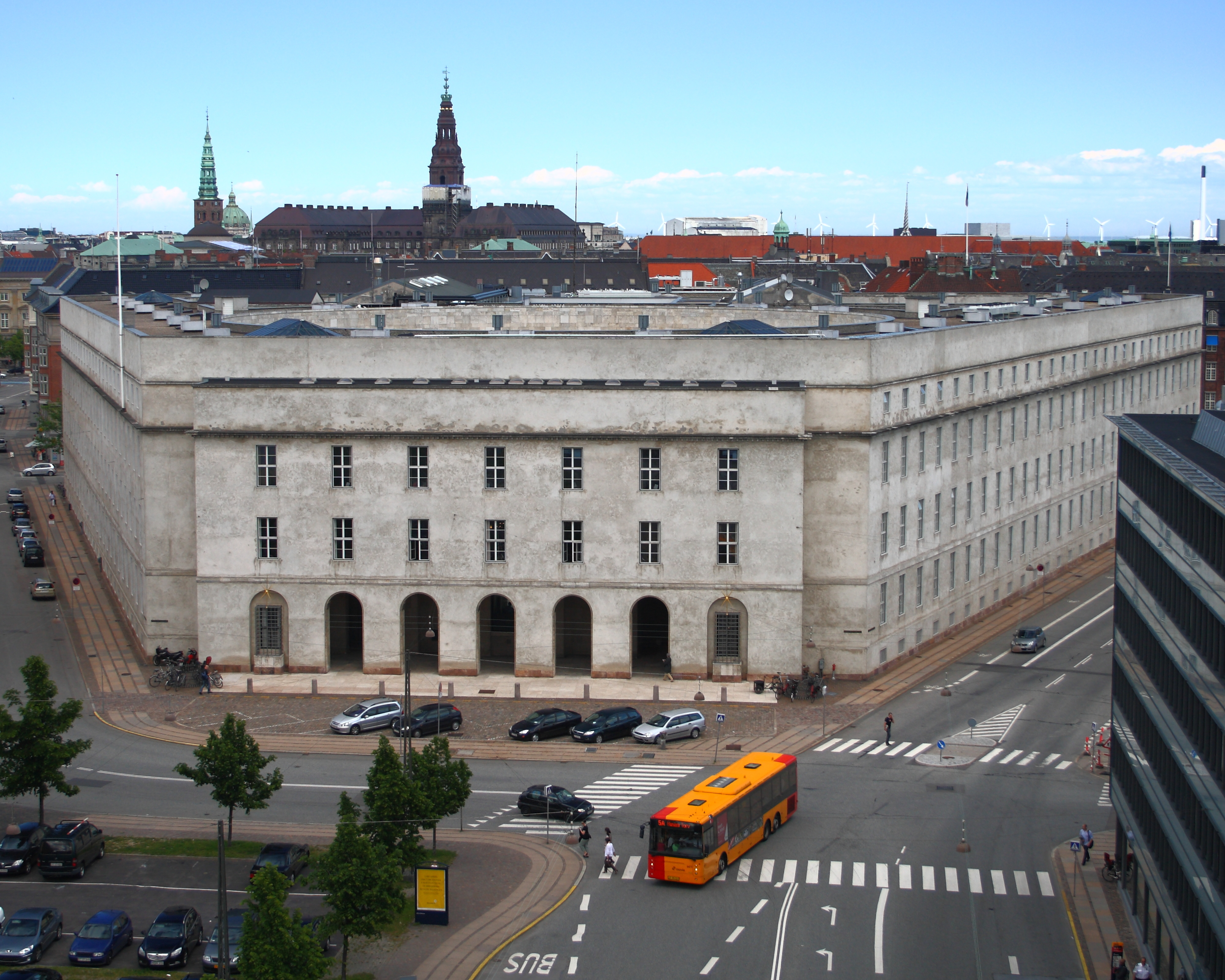
Politigården police headquarters

The first series consists of twenty fifty-minute episodes, which follow the police investigation into the murder of a young woman from its commencement on 3 November to its conclusion on 22 November.

The first ten episodes were shown on DR1 each Sunday from early January to the middle of March 2007 and the intention was to show the remaining ten episodes in January–March 2008; it was so popular in Denmark that in early March it was announced that the final ten episodes would be brought forward to the autumn of 2007; they were shown from late September to late November 2007.

=== Synopsis ===
Deputy Inspector Sarah Lund is looking forward to her last day at the Copenhagen Police. She is about to move to Sweden with her fiancé and be transferred to the Swedish police, but everything changes when a 19-year-old woman, Nanna Birk Larsen, goes missing. She is found raped and brutally murdered. Together with her colleague, Detective Inspector Jan Meyer, Sarah is forced to lead the investigation as it quickly becomes clear that she and Meyer are hunting a highly intelligent and dangerous killer.

Local politician Troels Hartmann is in the middle of a tough election campaign to become the new mayor of Copenhagen when evidence links him to the murder, adding a political thread and further intrigue to the story. At the same time, the girl's family and friends struggle to cope with their loss.

=== Episodes and ratings ===
No.	Title	Danish ratings (DR1)	UK ratings (BBC Four)	Danish air date (DR1 and DR HD)	UK air date (BBC Four)
1	"Episode 1"	1,550,000	472,000	7 January 2007	22 January 2011
A woman is chased by an unknown person in the woods. Inspector Sarah Lund's Danish colleagues throw her a surprise farewell party as she is emigrating to Sweden along with her son, to live with her boyfriend. At an isolated site, police find blood, a woman's clothes, and a video card in Theis Birk Larsen's name. Sarah and new DCI Inspector Jan Meyer are called to the scene. Theis runs a transport company and lives with his wife Pernille, daughter Nanna and two sons. Troels Hartmann, a government education minister, is standing to be Mayor of Copenhagen; the incumbent, Poul Bremer, offers him a deal to back out but he refuses. Sarah and Jan question Pernille and ask her to call her daughter Nanna, who supposedly spent the night at a girlfriend's; Nanna is unreachable. The police gather Nanna's class for questioning, cancelling the mayoral debate at the school. Meanwhile, Lisa, Nanna's best friend, leaves and searches for Nanna, presuming her to be with Oliver, her ex-boyfriend. Theis goes to Oliver's house, but Nanna is not there. Sarah leads a search party into the woods, missing her farewell reception and flight. They find Nanna's body in the boot of a car submerged in a nearby waterway. The car belongs to Troels's campaign office.
2	"Episode 2"	1,707,000	421,000	14 January 2007	22 January 2011
Sarah and Jan question Theis and Pernille. The detectives meet with Troels and his advisor, Rie. While asking Hartmann's campaign about the car, the vehicle's most recent driver, John Lynge, manages to escape. Sarah's chief asks her to stay until the conclusion of the case. Sarah questions Lisa, and the police place the car at Nanna's school during a Halloween party, after which Nanna went missing. Troels wants to release a press statement regarding the campaign's association with Lynge, but Sarah asks him to wait; the press gets hold of the information anyway. Sarah and Jan question Lynge's sister, leading them to a flat; Lynge breaks into the neighbouring flat, taking a blind woman as hostage.
3	"Episode 3"	1,622,000	424,000	21 January 2007	29 January 2011
Sarah and Jan break into the flat. Sarah finds Lynge, who tells her he was at the hospital and someone has stolen the car. Jan shows up at the scene, forcing Lynge to flee. He falls from the building, injuring himself. While Lynge is moved to the hospital, journalists mob Troels’s office. The police find Nanna's costume in the bicycle cellar at her school, but her cycle is still missing. Sarah and Jan question Oliver, but are interrupted by Oliver's father. Troels finds out that his campaign secretary, Morten, leaked the information to the press. Sarah questions Lynge at the hospital; he tells her about a boiler room near the cellar. Jan discovers the boiler room, finding signs of blood, drugs and struggle.
4	"Episode 4"	1,213,000	388,000	28 January 2007	29 January 2011
The police examine the blood and drugs found in the boiler room. Lund questions Jeppe, Oliver's friend and the head of the student council, who had access to the cellar. Troels calls Sarah for a meeting at a cafe. Sara's Swedish boyfriend, Bengt, returns home. Sarah finds expensive boots while searching Nanna's room. Sarah questions Theis and Pernille about the boots. Pernille visits Lisa at the school. Rie confronts Morten about the leak and shows the email in his inbox, but he denies writing it. The forensic team finds bed sores on Nanna's body, indicating she was drugged and raped multiple times, and then cleaned afterwards. The police suspect the work of a serial offender. Jan recovers a mobile video from Jeppe showing Oliver having sex with a girl similar to Nanna in the boiler room.
5	"Episode 5"	1,532,000	524,000	4 February 2007	5 February 2011
Sarah searches the boiler room again, recovering a broken earring. Jan shows the video to Oliver, but he says the girl in the video isn't Nanna. Lisa confesses to Sarah that it was her in the boiler room with Oliver. Sarah and Jan interview the school's teachers; Rama, one of the teachers, tells them that Nanna wrote an erotic story recently about a secret affair between a married man and a young girl. Nanna's paper is missing; the principal suggests that Henning, a linguistics teacher who has access to the papers, could have taken it. Sarah and Jan meet Henning at his house and recover the paper; on noticing porn magazines, Jan questions him. Henning reveals that Rama was once accused of sexual assault at the school, but the girl retracted her statement. Morten asks Troels not to trust the civil servants, suspecting they might secretly be working for Mayor Bremer. Rama visits Pernille at her house with flowers from the school. Realising the police are questioning the teachers, Theis asks his employee, Vagn, to gather information about the case from a source in the school.
6	"Episode 6"	1,600,000	443,000	11 February 2007	5 February 2011
Sarah reads Nanna's story. Jan informs Sarah they received files on all teachers from Troels's office except Rama. The police look into the background of Rama, a Syrian immigrant. Sarah and Jan visit Rama's house, but only his wife, another teacher at the school, is there. Rama's wife says that they spent the weekend at their allotment. Noticing a plastic strip in the house, Sarah searches it, finding more strips and a bottle of ether. The principal informs Troels about the police's suspicion of Rama, who is also part of Troels's immigrant role model campaign. Troels visits Sarah at her house, and Sarah questions him about Rama's missing file. Sarah and Jan learn that Rama drove away at night after coming to the allotment with his wife. Nanna's funeral is held. The police looks into Theis's past, and they learn he apparently beat up a drug dealer 20 years ago. At the funeral, Vagn informs Theis that Rama is the prime suspect. Sarah boards the plane for Sweden while Theis offers to drive Rama home.
7	"Episode 7"	1,512,000	524,000	18 February 2007	12 February 2011
Sarah gets off her flight to Sweden because she fears for Rama's safety. The police search for Rama, who hasn't returned home. Jan is surprised to see Sarah. Theis drives Rama to a harbour, but leaves him unharmed. Sarah and Jan question Rama, who confesses that on the night of the party, Nanna briefly visited him in his flat at Ryparken to return some books, and she left her bicycle in front of his house. Troels decides not to suspend Rama. The police search Rama's flat and question him. Sarah suspects Rama of lying. Sarah questions Rama's neighbour, who reveals that Rama took a girl from his flat to a car waiting outside with an Arab person in it. Sarah's boyfriend, Bengt, visits her, asking her to come to Sweden, but she refuses until she has solved the case. She gives Nanna's file to Bengt, who is a criminal psychologist, to help her profile the killer. The police listen to a threatening call Rama made in Arabic to a friend; Jan tries to track down the friend.
8	"Episode 8"	1,712,000	466,000	25 February 2007	12 February 2011
Jan and Sarah visit Rama's father, an imam at the mosque, while they search for Rama's friend, Mustafa Akkad. Rama's father tells them that Mustafa rents garages. The police find Mustafa's garage, where in a hidden cell they find a mattress and a girl's clothes. Pernille recognises a sweatshirt similar to one owned by Nanna. Bengt, who has been studying Nanna's file, has an accident and is admitted to hospital; Bengt tells Sarah that the killer has a modus operandi, and so must be a serial offender. The police arrest Rama, but release him due to lack of evidence. He goes back to work, but the students don’t want to attend his class. Troels is informed that as a role model, Rama had access to the same car used by the killer. Police arrest and question Mustafa, who reveals that Rama helped a girl fleeing an arranged marriage and allowed her stay at the garage. Theis kidnaps Rama.
9	"Episode 9"	1,634,000	536,000	4 March 2007	19 February 2011
The police search for Theis, who has taken Rama to an old warehouse. Theis savagely beats Rama, but the police arrive and Theis is arrested. Sarah visits Bengt in hospital to discuss the case. He asks her to look into the car again, calling it the best lead. Sarah examines its mileage log and suspects that the car was refuelled before the murder by the killer. She gets the name of the petrol station used to fuel the campaign cars and recovers its surveillance tapes. Sarah recognises the man refuelling the car as the employee who handles car keys at the office; he tells Sarah that he found the car at the school and returned it to the Town Hall car park, putting the keys in the office. The surveillance tape is missing. Sarah asks Jan to look for cold cases related to missing girls over the past ten years.
10	"Episode 10"	1,678,000	480,000	11 March 2007	19 February 2011
Sarah and Jan review the surveillance tape, and it shows a man taking the car while a party was being held at Troels’s office. Bengt leaves for Sweden without Sarah. Jan finds a number missing in the report of Nanna's phone details, and he suspects that Chief Inspector Buchard is covering for a politician. Sarah and Jan question a taxi driver who drove Nanna from Ryparken to Gronningen on the night of the party; he reveals that Nanna made him stop at the Town Hall and went inside for a few minutes. Pernille learns that Nanna had opened saving accounts in her brothers' names and deposited 11,000 kroner. Sarah recovers a video of Troels's party at the Town Hall that shows Holck, leader of the Moderate Party, leaving early. Sarah questions Troels regarding Holck; Buchard discharges her from duty. Pernille learns that her sister, Charlotte, got Nanna a temporary job at the bar where she works, and Nanna started seeing a man there. Charlotte reveals that she and Theis found Nanna drunk in a hotel room one night. Sarah tries the key found with Nanna in the buildings near Gronningen; she discovers the keys belong to a flat where she finds posters from Troels's campaign and signs of blood and struggle.
11	"Episode 11"	1,371,000	509,000	23 September 2007	26 February 2011
The police search the flat, which belongs to Troels's Liberal Party, finding Nanna's blood and fingerprints. Sarah and Jan question Troels but are interrupted by Deputy Chief Lennart Brix, who lets Troels go. Theis is released from custody. Charlotte reveals to Sarah and Jan that Nanna was having an affair with a married man whom she called Faust, and they met in hotels and a flat. Sarah makes a fake dating profile and finds another profile named Faust. The police find that Faust contacted Nanna on the dating site, which is supported by the bar in which Charlotte and Nanna worked. Log files reveal that Faust logged on from the flat and used the Town Hall WiFi. Buckard is discharged from duty and Brix takes charge. Sarah questions Troels’s employees, including Olav Christensen. Sarah and Jan question a married woman, Nethe, who dated Faust through the site, but initially she denies knowing anything. Nethe visits the police and reveals Faust's identity. Sarah and Jan arrest Troels.
12	"Episode 12"	1,480,000	474,000	30 September 2007	26 February 2011
Hartmann admits he had used the username Faust on the dating site, but claims he had stopped using the site months before the messages were exchanged with Nanna. He provides Lund with a list of people who might know his password. Meyer checks Hartmann's alibi and finds that no one at the conference saw him until Sunday afternoon. Rie admits she never saw Hartmann on the Friday night that Nanna was kidnapped. Nethe, the woman who Hartmann had previously met on the dating site, says she phoned Hartmann that night and attempted to visit the party's flat, but she believes the person she had seen through the window was not Hartmann. Pernille and Theis attend grief counselling, and Pernille agrees to be interviewed by a journalist.
13	"Episode 13"	1,481,000	563,000	7 October 2007	5 March 2011
Hartmann is questioned by police about his false alibi but refuses to divulge where he had really been. Sarah asks Olav about extra money in his payslip, suspecting that it came from the killer. Olav approaches Bremer in the mistaken belief that Bremer has been sending him money in exchange for favours, but Bremer does not recognise him. Before the police can find and question him, Olav is struck by a car and dies. Theis empties Nanna's bedroom of her belongings, believing this will encourage Pernille to begin moving on from Nanna's death. Instead, a devastated Pernille demands that Theis leave their house.
14	"Episode 14"	1,385,000	511,000	14 October 2007	5 March 2011
Philip Dessau, Bremer's press advisor, tells the police that the consulting money in Olav's pay was routed through Hartmann's office. The police investigate Hartmann's summer home and find that the windows and doors have been covered up with mattresses and towels. Hartmann admits that he tried to kill himself there on the Friday night of Nanna's death. The city councillors bring Hartmann before a tribunal and vote to exclude him from the mayoral election. In light of Hartmann's new alibi, Sarah suspects that Dessau had been the driver of the white car that struck Olav, and she questions Jens Holck about his behaviour during a trip to Latvia in August. While interviewing Holck, Sarah finds the car hidden in his garage. Theis is attacked and robbed while drunk outside of a bar, and he misses Nanna's urn burial.
15	"Episode 15"	1,581,000	597,000	21 October 2007	12 March 2011
Jens reveals he had used Hartmann's computer to meet Nanna, had paid Olav to use the Liberal party's flat, and had doctored documents to implicate Hartmann. He attacks Sarah, but Meyer arrives and kills him. Although the case is considered solved, Sarah still has doubts. She visits the father of Mette, one of the missing girls from the cold case files, and finds a photograph of her wearing a black heart necklace similar to the one found with Nanna's body. The city council's decision to exclude Hartmann from the election is revoked.
16	"Episode 16"	1,624,000	535,000	28 October 2007	12 March 2011
Lund receives a mysterious video cassette showing Nanna talking with Jens Holck before travelling. Theis Birk Larsen receives a video from Amir, his landlord's son, with a message from Nanna saying that she and Amir are eloping. Lund and Meyer follow up leads relating to Mette. Circumstantial evidence shows that it may have been a removal worker in both cases.
17	"Episode 17"	1,767,000	613,000	8 November 2007	19 March 2011
Lund and Meyer continue to try to work out who the removal worker was whom Amir saw, and who was involved with Mette's murder. It appears to be either Vagn or Vagn's similar-looking friend Leon. Leon points out to the Larsens that Vagn lied about a certain removal job that he claimed to have done, causing the Larsens to become suspicious of Vagn. A body is found in the same swamp where Nanna was found, with evidence linking it to the previous removal company that had been active when Mette was killed. Mayor Bremer covers up evidence of his having covered up Jens Holck's involvement with Nanna.
18	"Episode 18"	1,767,000	551,000	15 November 2007	19 March 2011
Leon Frevert, Vagn's friend who worked at the removal company related to murder victim Nanna and the previous victim Mette, evades police pursuit while Lund's lack of sleep causes her judgement to decline. She begs Meyer to follow her into a storage unit where clues relating to Mette's murder might be found. They are separated. An unknown assailant, who is seen by Meyer, shoots him several times. In the hospital, the doctor promises that Meyer will recover, but Meyer dies unexpectedly. Police officials try again to take Lund off the case. Anton Birk Larsen, Theis Larsen's son, finds Nanna's passport in the basement of their new house, still under construction. He hides it. The Larsens begin to try to reconcile with Vagn.
19	"Episode 19"	1,827,000	603,000	22 November 2007	26 March 2011
The prosecutor accuses Sarah Lund of shooting Jan Meyer due to her anxiety and paranoia. Bengt helps get her a temporary release with a fake psychological report. Mayor Bremer suffers a non-lethal stroke. Troels Hartmann accuses Rie Skorsgard of being part of the conspiracy and asks her to leave. Someone has taken Nanna's passport from the hiding place that Anton had found; Theis scolds him for lying. Troels Hartmann becomes more paranoid about involvement in the murder due to Bremer's accusations. The police try to recapture Sarah Lund due to the fake release papers, reporting that the passport was found at Leon Frevert's residence. Sarah finds out that Mette Hauge's boyfriend gave her a black heart necklace. Pernille Birk Larsen asks Anton who he thinks took the passport; he is implied to suggest Vagn, and Pernille begins attempting to follow up on that by double-checking about a removal appointment that Vagn had cancelled. Sarah meets Vagn and sees him wearing a shirt with the a logo that matches Jan Meyer's last words.
20	"Episode 20"	2,107,000	599,000	29 November 2007	26 March 2011
Lund and another rogue police officer search the house that Theis and Vagn were building, looking for more evidence against Vagn. Troels Hartmann is drinking more heavily and expressing paranoia towards other staff. He fires Rie Skorsgard, suspecting her of being the unknown person who had access to town hall keys and video. The prosecutor and police captain re-arrest Lund, but the captain grants her wish of a forensic technician at Theis's new house. When Vagn hears of this at Anton's birthday party, he asks Theis to join him in collecting a birthday surprise. The forensic team finds evidence that Nanna Birk Larsen was abused beneath the floor of the basement that Vagn had built. Mayor Bremer sends Hartmann a photo of Hartmann congratulating Nanna Birk Larsen for a school sports event. This prompts Morten to reveal that he tampered with evidence linking Nanna to the town hall, to protect Hartmann. Vagn drives Theis out to a forest, chased by Lund. Vagn confesses to Theis that he did not approve of Nanna's relationship with Amir, and had kidnapped Nanna, abused her in the new house, and then killed her. Vagn asks Theis to kill him using a shotgun he brought. Lund and Pernille arrive and ask him not to. Theis kills Vagn. The police chief offers Sarah a job elsewhere in exchange for ending investigation into Morten's deeds. Lund refuses. Hartmann drinks all night, but Morten has hired a new assistant for him, who gives him instructions. Lund wanders off down the street.

== Series 2 ==
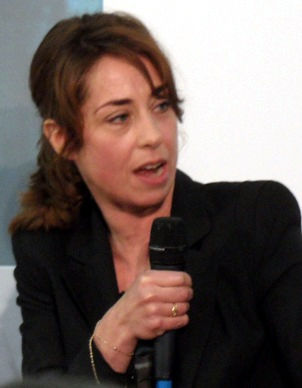
Sofie Gråbøl (2011)

Forbrydelsen II is set two years later and consists of ten episodes. It aired in Denmark between 27 September and 29 November 2009. Episodes were screened eleven days later on Thursdays on Norwegian NRK1. It was shown on German TV channel ZDF and on Swedish SVT in the autumn of 2010. In the United Kingdom, it was shown on BBC Four, starting from 19 November 2011, following the success of the first series, on the Belgian channel, Canvas, starting on 25 November 2011, and in Australia on SBS Two, starting from 21 March 2012. The Region 2 DVD with English subtitles was released on 19 December 2011.

=== Plot ===
Inspector Ulrik Strange arrives at a port where Lund is working as a border guard, on the orders of her former boss, Brix, to ask her to return to help investigate the murder of Anne Dragsholm, a military adviser found murdered in Ryvangen Memorial Park. Lund suspects that the murder is not as straightforward as it seems, despite the forced confession of Dragsholm's husband. Meanwhile, Thomas Buch, the newly appointed Minister of Justice, suspects that his predecessor was involved in the cover-up of a massacre of Afghan civilians by Danish soldiers and that this incident is connected with the murder. Lund is about to be discharged from the case when a second killing, that of a Danish military veteran, leads to fears that Islamic extremists are involved. Jens Peter Raben, a sectioned war veteran, knew both victims and tells his story of the execution of an Afghan family by a special forces officer named "Perk". Raben escapes, and two other members of the unit are murdered. Suspicion falls on senior military officers, including Raben's father-in-law, Colonel Jarnvig.

Buch and his secretarial team uncover further evidence of the cover-up, but the cabinet pressures him to continue pinning the murders on Muslims in order to assure the passage of an anti-terrorism bill. Raben takes refuge in a church presided over by a former army chaplain, who tries to convince him to give himself up and stop investigating the killings. Lund discovers the chaplain's body and pursues the perpetrator. She arranges for the exhumation of Perk's body. When Lund and Strange catch up with Raben, he calls out Perk's name before Strange shoots him. An injured Raben persists in accusing Perk of being the officer responsible for the massacre, yet it is later officially confirmed that he had left Afghanistan before the killings. Lund is uneasy about Strange's alibis for the murders, but takes him with her to Afghanistan to investigate a new suspect. Lund's persistence results in the discovery of the bones of the Afghan civilians.

Upon returning to Denmark, Lund meets her mother, who has had a premonition of Lund lying dead. Following a further search of a military barracks, suspicion falls on Captain Bilal, an anti-Taliban Muslim who kidnaps Raben's wife Louise. Raben and Jarnvig lead Lund and Strange to Bilal, who is killed by an explosion before they are able to question him. Strange volunteers to return Raben to the mental hospital, but Lund insists on driving them. On the way, they make a stop at the scene of Dragsholm's murder, where Lund points out to Strange the reasons why Bilal is unlikely to have been involved. Strange reveals a detail that only the murderer could know, and confesses to the murders before shooting Lund with her own gun, which he then plants on Raben. He phones the police and is about to shoot Raben when Lund hits him over the head. When Strange tries to retrieve his gun, Lund shoots him dead. As the police arrive at the scene, Lund walks away, removing her bullet-proof vest.

=== Episodes and ratings ===
No.	Title	Official TNS Gallup ratings	Official BARB ratings	Danish air date (DR1)	UK air date (BBC Four)
1	"Episode 21"	1,702,000	1,248,000	27 September 2009	19 November 2011
2	"Episode 22"	1,696,000	909,000	4 October 2009	19 November 2011
3	"Episode 23"	1,479,000	1,080,000	11 October 2009	26 November 2011
4	"Episode 24"	1,677,000	863,000	18 October 2009	26 November 2011
5	"Episode 25"	1,658,000	1,090,000	25 October 2009	3 December 2011
6	"Episode 26"	1,505,000	859,000	1 November 2009	3 December 2011
7	"Episode 27"	1,575,000	1,044,000	8 November 2009	10 December 2011
8	"Episode 28"	1,609,000	902,000	15 November 2009	10 December 2011
9	"Episode 29"	1,561,000	1,085,000	22 November 2009	17 December 2011
10	"Episode 30"	1,735,000	928,000	29 November 2009	17 December 2011

== Series 3 ==
Forbrydelsen III, premiered on Danish television on 23 September 2012. It commenced on NRK1 in Norway on Monday 8 October 2012, with an audience of 436,000. Series 3 on BBC Four in the UK began on 17 November 2012 with 1.04 million viewers.

=== Synopsis ===
This final ten-part series begins with the murder of a sailor. Sarah Lund's investigation turns to the financial and governmental communities during the 2008 financial crisis.

=== Episodes and ratings ===
No.	Title	Official TNS Gallup ratings	Official BARB ratings	Danish air date (DR1)	UK air date (BBC Four)
1	"Episode 31"	1,678,000	1,264,000	23 September 2012	17 November 2012
2	"Episode 32"	1,746,000	1,111,000	30 September 2012	17 November 2012
3	"Episode 33"	1,516,000	1,090,000	7 October 2012	24 November 2012
4	"Episode 34"	1,463,000	999,000	14 October 2012	24 November 2012
5	"Episode 35"	1,644,000	1,000,000	21 October 2012	1 December 2012
6	"Episode 36"	1,703,000	1,023,000	28 October 2012	1 December 2012
7	"Episode 37"	1,706,000	1,099,000	4 November 2012	8 December 2012
8	"Episode 38"	1,708,000	1,036,000	11 November 2012	8 December 2012
9	"Episode 39"	1,773,000	1,083,000 + 200,000 BBC HD	18 November 2012	15 December 2012
10	"Episode 40"	1,981,000	1,027,000 + 194,000 BBC HD	25 November 2012	15 December 2012

Note: Figures listed above for the UK broadcast of episodes 1 – 8 do not include the ratings for BBC HD.

== Overseas success ==
In the wake of the successful Wallander series, The Killing became another Scandinavian crime hit with British viewers when it was shown on BBC Four in the spring of 2011. Although subtitled, it attracted more viewers than Mad Men, scored audience appreciation figures of 94%, and was described as "the best series currently on TV". The success created an interest in all things Danish, and the female detective's Faroese jumper was the subject of newspaper articles as well as becoming a sought after online item.

As well as the UK, DR also sold the series to a number of other broadcasters worldwide, and The Killing was eventually shown in Australia, Austria, Belgium, Brazil, Canada, Germany, Japan, Russia, Spain and the US with varying degrees of success. Producer Piv Bernth described the broad appeal of the show as "groundbreaking", and explained what she believed to be the root of its popularity:

"It's the first time you have a detective drama over 20 episodes – other series had one killing per episode. And we also have this three-plot structure – what does it [a murder] mean for a police investigator, what does it mean for the parents, what does it mean for the politicians. It's not just about finding the murderer. That's important, but it's not all."

Over 120 countries have purchased the first two seasons of The Killing. The first series has also been shown in other countries, as follows:

- 2007: Norway on NRK1 (as Forbrytelsen)
- 2007: Finland on Yle Fem (as Brottet) and AVA (as Rikos)
- 2007: Faroe Islands on SvF (as Brotsgerðin)
- 2008: Sweden on SVT1 (as Brottet)
- 2008: Iceland on RÚV
- 2008: Germany on ZDF (as Kommissarin Lund: Das Verbrechen)
- 2009: Austria on ORF
- 2010: Belgium, France, Germany on ARTE (as The Killing)
- 2010: Australia on SBS One
- 2010: Belgium on Canvas
- 2011: United Kingdom on BBC Four (as The Killing)
- 2011: Russia on Channel One (as Убийство)
- 2011: Spain on AXN (as The Killing: Crónica de un asesinato)
- 2011: Portugal on AXN Black (as The Killing: Crónica de um assassinato)
- 2011: Poland on Ale Kino+ (as The Killing)
- 2012: Japan on Super! drama TV (as The Killing)
- 2012: Brazil on Globosat HD (as The Killing: História de Um Assassinato)
- 2012: Netherlands on Nederland 2 by the KRO (as The Killing)
- 2012: Hungary
- 2012: New Zealand on SoHo TV (as Forbrydelsen)
- 2012: Belgium, France, Germany on ARTE (as The Killing)
- 2012: Italy on RAI4 (as Killing)
- 2012: Croatia on HRT3 (as Ubojstvo)
- 2013: Estonia on ETV (as Kuritegu)
- 2013: Czech Republic on ČT2 (as Zločin)
- 2013: Greece on Mega Channel (as The Killing)
- 2013: Turkey on Dizimax (as Forbrydelsen)
- 2013: Serbia on RTS 1 (as Ubistvo)
- 2013: Taiwan on PTS (as The Killing)
- 2013: Latin America on AXN Central & South America (as The Killing: Crónica de un asesinato)
- 2013: Republic of Ireland on TG4 (as The Killing)
- 2014: Iran, Afghanistan, Tajikistan on BBC Persian (as Ghatl dar Kopenhag [Murder in Copenhagen])
- 2015: Slovenia on TV3 Medias (as Investigation)
- 2020: Canada on Knowledge Network (as The Killing)
- 2021: Israel on Kan 11 (as The Murder)
- 2021: The USA on Amazon Prime (as The Killing)

== Awards and nominations ==
The Killing has been awarded a number of awards and recognitions from various festivals and organisations from around the globe since it began in 2007. Because of the time-lapse in airdates between countries, honours awarded to the first two series are spread out over an unusual number of years.

In the UK, the first series won the 2011 BAFTA award in the "Best International" category. It was also nominated for the Audience Award but lost to reality show The Only Way is Essex. The second series was again nominated for "Best International" in 2012, but lost out to fellow Danish programme Borgen.

Year	Award	Category	Nominee(s)	Result
2008	International Emmys	Best Drama Series	The Killing	Nominated
2008	International Emmys	Best Performance by an Actress	Sofie Gråbøl	Nominated
2010	Monte-Carlo Television Festival	Outstanding International Producer for a Drama Series	Piv Bernth	Nominated
2010	Monte-Carlo Television Festival	Outstanding European Producer for a Drama Series	Piv Bernth	Won
2010	Monte-Carlo Television Festival	Outstanding Actor in a Drama Series	Nicolas Bro	Nominated
2010	Monte-Carlo Television Festival	Outstanding Actress in a Drama Series	Sofie Gråbøl	Nominated
2010	International Emmys	Best Drama Series	The Killing II	Nominated
2011	BAFTA Television Awards	Best International TV Series	The Killing	Won
2011	BAFTA Television Awards	Audience Award	The Killing	Nominated
2011	Crime Thriller Awards UK	Best International TV Series	The Killing	Won
2011	Crime Thriller Awards UK	Best Actor	Lars Mikkelsen	Nominated
2011	Crime Thriller Awards UK	Best Actress	Sofie Gråbøl	Won
2011	Crime Thriller Awards UK	Best Supporting Actor	Bjarne Henriksen	Nominated
2011	Crime Thriller Awards UK	Best Supporting Actor	Soren Malling	Nominated
2011	Crime Thriller Awards UK	Best Supporting Actress	Ann Eleonora Jørgensen	Won
2012	Royal Television Society Programme Awards	International Award	The Killing	Nominated
2012	BAFTA Television Awards	Best International	The Killing II	Nominated
2012	Crime Thriller Awards UK	Best International TV Series	The Killing II	Nominated
2012	Crime Thriller Awards UK	Best Actress	Sofie Gråbøl	Nominated
2013	Monte-Carlo Television Festival	Outstanding European TV Drama Series	The Killing III	Nominated
2013	Monte-Carlo Television Festival	Outstanding Actress in a TV Drama Series	Sofie Gråbøl	Won
2013	Crime Thriller Awards UK	Best International TV Series	The Killing III	Won
2013	Crime Thriller Awards UK	Best Actress	Sofie Gråbøl	Nominated

== Subtitled programmes in the UK ==
Following both its critical and ratings success in the United Kingdom, the BBC began importing and broadcasting more subtitled programmes from a number of different countries. In 2012 the popular Danish drama Borgen and the more popular joint Swedish-Danish venture The Bridge both aired on BBC Four with similarly high viewing figures, while in the same year ITV3 also acquired the original TV2 series Those Who Kill. In late 2011 digital channel Sky Arts also broadcast the Italian series Romanzo Criminale, while FX bought the rights to popular French cop show Braquo.

Although BBC Four had shown subtitled dramas before, notably the Swedish version of Wallander and French police procedural Spiral, controller of the channel Richard Klein described The Killing as "a game-changer". Vicky Frost of The Guardian noted how it was The Killing which "paved the way for a wave of subtitled European crime dramas" appearing on UK television, while head of programming at FX Toby Etheridge also confirmed his belief that "The Killing proved it was possible [to successfully show subtitled drama]".

== Remakes ==
The original series was not broadcast in the US. In 2011 a remake was produced by Fox Television Studios for the American cable network AMC. It premiered on 3 April 2011 and ran for two seasons before being cancelled on 27 July 2012. However, on 8 November 2012, it was confirmed that Fox Television Studios were in final negotiations with Netflix in order to continue the series for a third season. AMC, who had originally cancelled the show, was also included in part of the deal. The deal in question gives the network the privilege of airing the new episodes before they are hosted by Netflix in return for sharing any associated production costs with Netflix. The original US production team are expected to return. A fourth season, consisting of six episodes, was produced by and is available on Netflix.

On 8 April 2011, Sofie Gråbøl, the star of the Danish series, was interviewed on the BBC Radio 4 programme Woman's Hour when she explained the American remake was necessary because Americans "for some reason cannot read subtitles, or they don't want to". Gråbøl herself has made a guest appearance in one episode of the American show playing a minor role.

A Turkish remake, Cinayet, was produced by Adam Film for Kanal D, premiering 7 January 2014. Despite being ordered for 13 episodes, it was cancelled after 5 due to low ratings.

An Egyptian remake, Mounatef Khater was produced, the rights were previously acquired by MBC and Charisma Group.

An Indian remake Search: The Naina Murder Case was released on 10 October 2025 on JioHotstar.

== Novelisations ==
A novelisation based on the first series and titled The Killing: Book One was published by Macmillan in 2012. The book was written by British author David Hewson. This was followed by The Killing: Book Two in January 2013, and The Killing: Book Three in February 2014.

== See also ==
- Danish television drama
- Scandinavian noir
