= Natasha Arthy =

Danish screenwriter, director and producer

Natasha Arty
- Born: 23 May 1969 (age 57); Gentofte, Denmark
- Occupations: Director, Writer, Producer
- Years active: 1993–Present

Natasha Arthy (born 23 May 1969 in Gentofte, Denmark) is a Danish screenwriter, film director and producer, best known for her 2003 Dogme film Se til venstre, der er en Svensker (USA Title: Old, New, Borrowed and Blue), which received the Grand Jury Prize at the Los Angeles Film Festival.

== Filmography ==
=== Director ===
- HONEY (2024)
- Fightgirl Ayse (2007)
- Se til venstre, der er en Svensker (2003) ... a.k.a. Dogme # 32 ... a.k.a. Old, New, Borrowed and Blue (USA)
- Mirakel (2000) ... a.k.a. Miracle (International: English title)
- Barbie (1997)
- Drengen de kaldte Kylling (1997) TV mini-series
- Fanny Farveløs (1997) ... a.k.a. Penny Plain
- Y's fantom farmor (1996) TV mini-series
- Container Conrad (1995) TV mini-series
- Forunderlige Frede (1995) TV mini-series
- Fortælle frikadelle (1993) TV mini-series

=== Producer ===
- Anton — min hemmelige ven II (2002) TV series (producer) (episodes 1.1-1.4, 1.6, 1.8)
- Drengen de kaldte Kylling (1997) TV mini-series (producer)
- Y's fantom farmor (1996) TV mini-series (producer)
- Container Conrad (1995) TV mini-series (producer)
- Forunderlige Frede (1995) TV mini-series (producer)

=== Writer ===
- Fightgirl Ayse (2007)
- Y's fantom farmor (1996) TV mini-series
- Container Conrad (1995) TV mini-series
