= Susanne Ditlevsen =

Danish mathematician and statistician (born 1965)

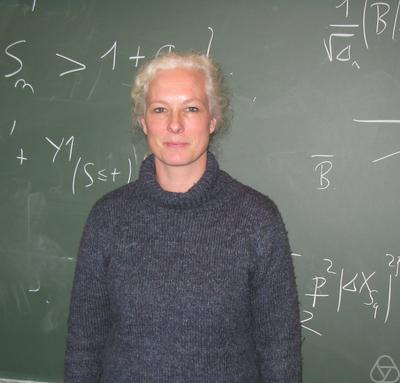
- Ditlevsen at the MFO seminar Statistics for Stochastic Differential Equations in 2011
- Born: 1965 (age 60–61); Denmark
- Education: National University of Distance Education; University of Copenhagen
- Occupations: Mathematician; statistician
- Relatives: Sara Hjort Ditlevsen (niece)

Susanne Ditlevsen (born 1965) is a Danish mathematician and statistician, interested in mathematical biology, perception, dynamical systems, and statistical modeling of biological systems. She is a professor in the Department of Mathematical Sciences of the University of Copenhagen, where she heads the section of statistics and probability theory.

== Early life ==
Ditlevsen was born in Denmark. She graduated from Det frie Gymnasium in 1983. She was an actress before she became a researcher.

== Career ==
Ditlevsen earned a master's degree in mathematics from the National University of Distance Education in Spain in 1999. The following year, she earned a master's degree in statistics from the University of Copenhagen. In 2004, she received a Ph.D. from the University of Copenhagen with the dissertation Modeling of physiological processes by stochastic differential equations.

After receiving her Ph.D., Ditlevsen became a professor in the Department of Mathematical Sciences at the University of Copenhagen in 2011. In 2012, she became an elected member of the International Statistical Institute, and in 2016, she was elected to the Royal Danish Academy of Sciences and Letters.

In 2023, she and her brother Peter, a climate scientist, published an article predicting that the Atlantic Meridional Overturning Circulation has a chance of collapsing between 2025 and 2095 (95% confidence interval), with the statistical average of the predictions being 2057 (updated in August 2025 to between 2037 and 2109, with average of 2065). When this tipping point is reached, it will have severe consequences to the world's climate, especially of northern Europe (see Effects of AMOC slowdown).

== Personal life ==
Her niece is actress Sara Hjort Ditlevsen.
