= Lisa Ohlin =

Swedish screenwriter and director (born 1960)

- Born: Lisa Karolina Ohlin; New York City
- Website: www.lisaohlin.com

Lisa Karolina Ohlin (born 20 February 1960 in New York City) is a Swedish screenwriter and director.

== Biography ==
Ohlin pursued film studies at the New York University Graduate Film School. During the studies, she worked in various functions in Swedish films. Between 2006 and 2009, she worked as a feature film consultant at the Swedish Film Institute.

She is the daughter of economist Göran Ohlin and Ruth Ohlin, stepdaughter to Anita Lagercrantz-Ohlin and granddaughter of Holger Ohlin.

== Filmography ==
Year	Title	Functioned as	
Year	Title	Director	Writer
1994	Ingen som Du	Yes	Yes
1995	Happy Days	Yes	Yes
1995	Nattens barn	Yes	No
1998	Waiting for the Tenor	Yes	Yes
2002	Familjen	Yes	No
2003	Seeking Temporary Wife	Yes	No
2005	Kvalster (TV series)	Yes	No
2005	Sex, Hope and Love	Yes	Yes
2011	Simon and the Oaks	Yes	No
2013	Wallander – Sorgfågeln	Yes	No
2016	Walk with Me	Yes	No
