= Søren Sveistrup =

Danish author and screenwriter

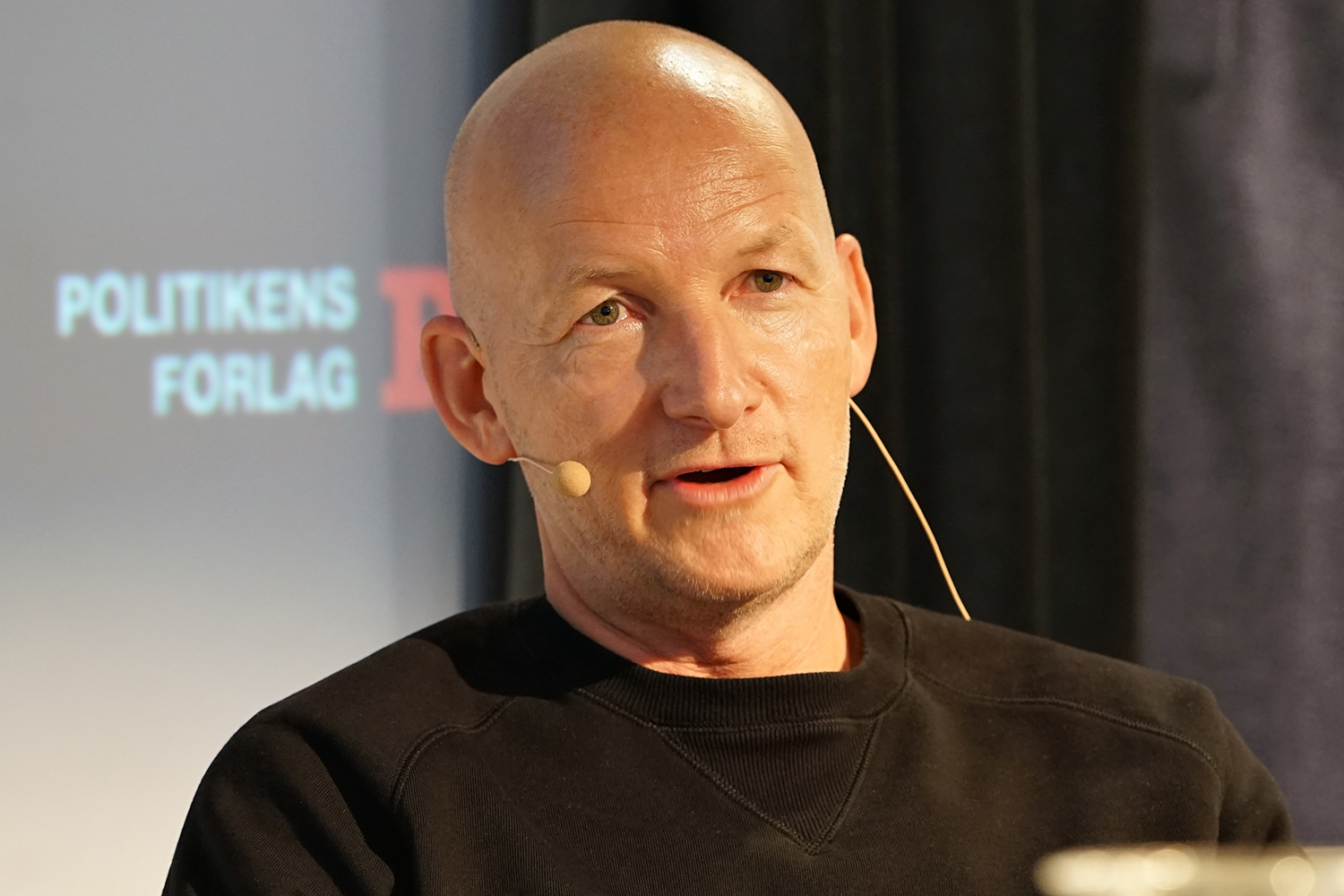

Søren Sveistrup (born 7 January, 1968) is a Danish screenwriter and author.

== Life and education ==
Søren Sveistrup studied history and literature at the University of Copenhagen, then received a degree in screenwriting at the National Film School of Denmark in 1997.

Sveistrup is married and has two sons.

== Career ==
He made his debut as a screenwriter in 1997 with Deadline, a television film, and as an author with a published short story in 1995. His TV credits include Nikolaj og Julie and The Killing.

His first novel, Kastanjemanden (The Chestnut Man), a crime novel, was published in 2018 and adapted into a Netflix television series,The Chestnut Man, in 2021, for which he was head writer and executive producer. His second novel, Tælle til en, tælle til to (Hide and Seek), was published in 2024, and was adapted into the second season of The Chestnut Man, released on May 7th, 2026.

Søren Sveistrup has received numerous Danish and international awards for his work, including an International Emmy Award for Best Drama Series (as head writer of Nikolaj og Julie), a BAFTA Award for Best International TV Series (as head writer of The Killing), and a Barry Award for Best First Novel (for The Chestnut Man).

== Awards ==
Year	Nominated work	Award	Category	Result	Ref.
2003	Nikolaj og Julie	International Emmy Awards	Best Drama Series	Won	
2008	The Killing	International Emmy Awards	Best Drama Series	Nominated	
2010	The Killing	International Emmy Awards	Best Drama Series	Nominated	
2011	The Killing	British Academy Film Awards	Audience Award	Nominated	
2011	The Killing	British Academy Film Awards	Best International TV Series	Won	
2012	The Killing	British Academy Film Awards	Best International TV Series	Nominated	
2013	The Killing	Crown Prince Couple's Awards	Culture Prize	Won	
2013	The Killing	Robert Awards	Best Danish Television Series	Won	
2017	The Day Will Come	Robert Awards	Best Screenplay	Won	
2020	The Chestnut Man	Audie Awards	Mystery	Won	
2020	The Chestnut Man	Barry Award	Best First Mystery	Won	
