= Sara Hjort Ditlevsen =

Danish actress (born 1988)

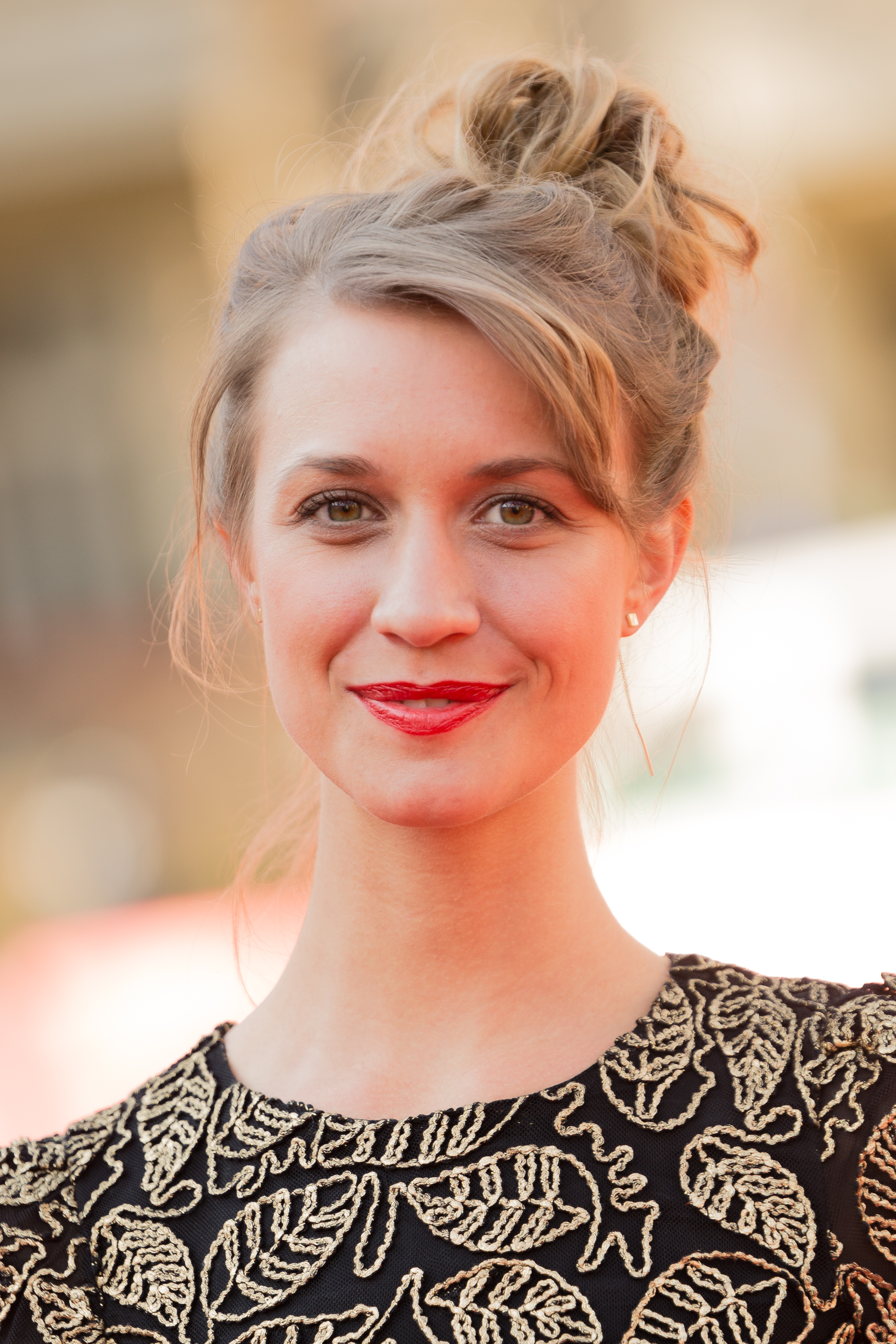
- Hjort Ditlevsen at the 2017 Berlin International Film Festival
- Born: 23 May 1988 (age 38); Hørsholm, Denmark
- Education: Danish National School of Performing Arts
- Occupations: Actress; director; screenwriter
- Years active: 2007–present
- Spouse: Jacob Lawaetz (m. 2019)
- Children: 2
- Relatives: Susanne Ditlevsen (aunt)

Sara Hjort Ditlevsen (born 23 May 1988) is a Danish actress, director, and screenwriter. For her role as Helene in the film Excuse Me (2012), she won the Bodil Award for Best Actress in a Leading Role at the 66th Bodil Awards.

== Early life ==
Hjort Ditlevsen was born in Hørsholm and raised in a housing collective in Birkerød. Her half-sister is director Lea Hjort Mathiesen and her aunt is mathematician Susanne Ditlevsen. She attended Aurehøj Gymnasium in Gentofte.

== Career ==
=== Acting ===
Hjort Ditlevsen began acting in theater productions at the age of 10. While a high school student, she made her screen debut as Katrin in the DR1 television series Performances in 2007. After high school, she briefly moved to Berlin and studied philosophy at the University of Copenhagen. She later made her feature film debut as Sofie in Love and Rage (2009).

After several years of acting professionally, she was accepted into the Danish National School of Performing Arts (DASPA) in 2012. While a student, she starred in the plays Heidi at Teater Grob and Miss Julie at the Aarhus Theatre. She also starred in the films Excuse Me (2012) and Borgman (2013), the former of which earned her the Bodil Award for Best Actress in a Leading Role at the 66th Bodil Awards. She graduated from DASPA in 2016.

=== Directing ===
After graduating from DASPA, she directed the short films Bror (2020) and Hungud (2021), the latter of which was nominated for the Robert Award for Best Short Fiction/Animation at the 40th Robert Awards in 2023.

== Personal life ==
Hjort Ditlevsen married Jacob Lawaetz at Odden Kirke in Odsherred in 2019. They have two children, Selma and Axel.

== Acting credits ==
=== Film ===
| Year | Title | Role | Notes | Ref. |
|---|---|---|---|---|
| 2009 | Love and Rage | Sofie | | |
| 2012 | Mellem træerne | Anna | Short film | |
| 2012 | Excuse Me | Helene | | |
| 2013 | 2 Girls 1 Cake | Julie | Short film | |
| 2013 | Borgman | Stine | | |
| 2015 | The Disappearing Illusionist | Maria | | |
| 2015 | Heaven | Victoria | Short film | |
| 2015 | Al Medina | Sarah | | |
| 2018 | Comic Sans | Sofie | | |
| 2019 | Daniel | Signe | | |
| 2020 | Breeder | Mia | | |

=== Television ===
| Year | Title | Role | Notes | Ref. |
|---|---|---|---|---|
| 2007 | Performances | Katrin | 6 episodes | |
| 2012–2020 | Rita | Molly Madsen | 14 episodes | |
| 2017 | Below the Surface | Louise Falck | 8 episodes | |
| 2017–2019 | Perfect Places | Rose | 20 episodes | |
| 2018–2020 | The Lawyer | Therese Waldman | 16 episodes | |
| 2022 | The Shift | Tine | 8 episodes | |
| 2025 | Giften i sandet | Marie Hansen | 4 episodes | |
| 2026 | Stein Bagger og grådighedens ansigter | Anette Uttenthal | Miniseries | |

=== Theater ===
| Year | Title | Role | Venue | Ref. |
|---|---|---|---|---|
| 2014 | Heidi | Heidi | Teater Grob | |
| 2015 | Miss Julie | Julie | Aarhus Theatre | |
| 2017 | Tvang | Claire | Teater Katapult | |
| 2021 | Miss Julie | Katrin | Bellevue Teatret | |

=== Music videos ===
| Year | Title | Artist | Role | Ref. |
|---|---|---|---|---|
| 2021 | "Gourmet" | Nikoline | Aphrodite | |

== Other credits ==
| Year | Title | Director | Writer | Notes | Ref. |
|---|---|---|---|---|---|
| 2018 | Europa | No | Yes | Short film | |
| 2019 | Bror | Yes | Yes | Short film | |
| 2021 | Hungud | Yes | Yes | Short film | |

== Awards and nominations ==
| Award | Year | Category | Nominated work | Result | Ref. |
|---|---|---|---|---|---|
| Bodil Awards | 2010 | Best Actress in a Supporting Role | Love and Rage | Nominated | |
| Bodil Awards | 2013 | Best Actress in a Leading Role | Excuse Me | Won | |
| Kraków Film Festival | 2019 | Short Film Competition | Bror | Special Mention | |
| Robert Awards | 2013 | Best Actress in a Leading Role | Excuse Me | Nominated | |
| Robert Awards | 2013 | Best Actress in a Supporting Television Role | Rita | Nominated | |
| Robert Awards | 2023 | Best Short Fiction/Animation | Hungud | Nominated | |
