= Nikolaj og Julie =

- Created by: Adam Price
- Country of origin: Denmark
- Original language: Danish
- No. of seasons: 3
- No. of episodes: 22

Production
- Running time: 43 minutes

Original release
- Network: DR1
- Release: 9 September 2002 – 2 November 2003

Nikolaj og Julie is a 2002 Danish drama television series created by Adam Price and produced by DR1, and starred Peter Mygind and Sofie Gråbøl.

== Plot ==
Nikolaj and Julie, form a young couple who reunite in Copenhagen, marrying soon after having their first daughter. Everything seems to go well until the pressures of work, the creation of children and friendships make the relationship into crisis.

== Cast ==
- Peter Mygind ... Nikolaj Bergstrøm
- Sofie Gråbøl ... Julie Krogh Andersen
- Dejan Čukić ... Philip Krøyer
- Sofie Stougaard ... Karina Kristensen
- Jesper Asholt ... Frank Kristensen
- Therese Glahn ... Søs Krogh Andersen
- Jonatan Tulested ... Jonatan Kristensen
- Mattias Tulested ... Mattias Kristensen
- Helle Fagralid ... Iben Vangsø
- Samir Di Johansson ...Advokat
- Nanna Jønsson-Moll ...Emma Bergstrøm Andersen
- Henning Jensen ...Hoffmann
- Peter Gantzler ... Lars Eriksen
- Lars Mikkelsen ... Per Køller

== Awards ==
Year	Award	Category	Result
2003	31st International Emmy Awards	Best Drama Series	Won
