= Povl Bang-Jensen =

Danish diplomat

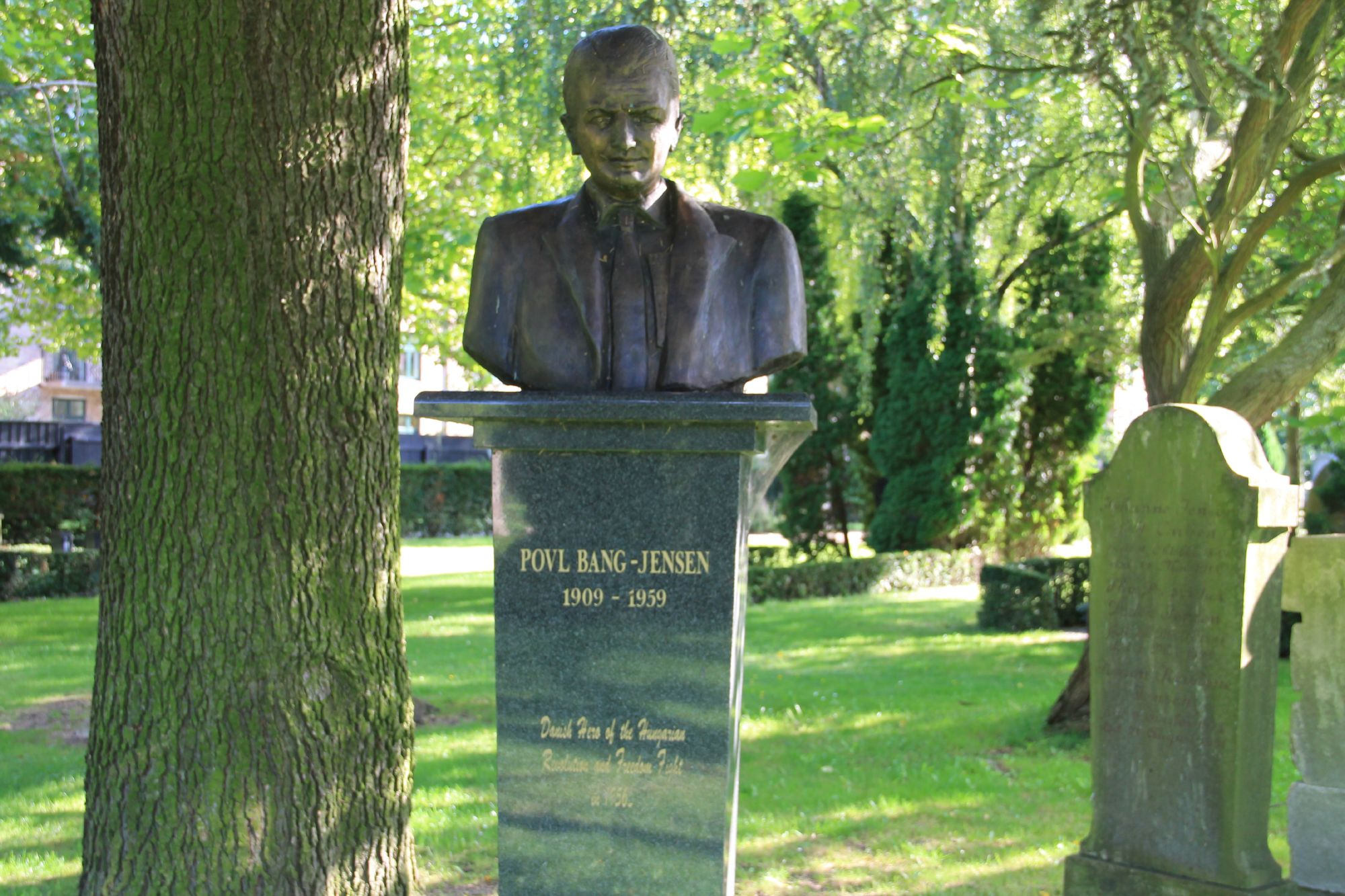
Bang-Jensen's tomb at Solbjerg Park Cemetery in Frederiksberg, Copenhagen.

Povl Bang-Jensen (6 April 1909 – 25 November 1959) was a Danish diplomat who refused to hand over a list of eighty-one witnesses to the Hungarian Revolution of 1956 to his UN superiors. It is thought that he considered their identities sensitive information, and if they were turned over to the UN Secretariat, they could be leaked to the Soviet Union, and reprisals could possibly be taken against their relatives in Hungary.

Investigators claim he was found dead of a gunshot wound with the gun in his hand and suicide note in his pocket in a park in Queens, New York City, on 26 November 1959 (Thanksgiving Day). Some analysts exclude suicide in spite of the results of the FBI report; for example, the fatal gunshot wound was located on his right temple, but Bang-Jensen was left-handed. Also, cited in W. Cleon Skousen's The Naked Communist, a letter to his wife prior to the incident included the statement, "Under no circumstances whatsoever would I ever commit suicide. This would be contrary to my whole nature and to my religious convictions. If any note was found to the opposite effect in my handwriting, it would be a fake." Also, Bang-Jensen had left his home 72 hours earlier to catch a bus. The coroner found he had been dead only a few hours, which indicated possible abduction.

His body was incinerated and buried in Denmark. A tombstone was placed in Budapest in Plot #301 of the New Cemetery of Rákoskeresztúr, among those for whom he fought.

His story is presented in a book by DeWitt Copp and Marshall Peck, Betrayal at the UN, the story of Povl Bang-Jensen, and in a Hungarian documentary, The Bang-Jensen affair (A Bang-Jensen ügy, 2008), directed by András Surányi.
