= Manslaughter (2005 film) =

- Theatrical release poster
- Directed by: Per Fly
- Written by: Per Fly; Mogens Rukov; Kim Leona
- Produced by: Ib Tardini
- Starring: Beate Bille; Jesper Christensen; Pernilla August; Charlotte Fich
- Cinematography: Harald Paalgard
- Edited by: Morten Giese
- Music by: Halfdan E
- Distributed by: Nordisk Film
- Release date: August 26, 2005
- Running time: 100 min
- Country: Denmark
- Language: Danish

Manslaughter (Danish: Drabet) is a 2005 Danish drama film written and directed by Per Fly. The film stars Jesper Christensen, Beate Bille and Pernilla August as well as Fly's wife Charlotte Fich.

Manslaughter won the Nordic Council Film Prize in 2005, multiple awards at the 2006 Bodil Awards — including Best Actor, Best Film and Best Supporting actress — as well as being nominated for several other major film awards. Beate Bille also received a Shooting Star Award at the 2006 Berlin International Film Festival for her role in the film.

The film is part of a trilogy by Fly about the Danish society. Bænken is about the underclass, Arven about the upper class and Manslaughter about the middle class.

== Cast ==
- Jesper Christensen
- Pernilla August
- Beate Bille
- Charlotte Fich
- Michael Moritzen
- Henrik Larsen
- Bodil Sangill
- Kurt Dreyer
- Mads Keiser
- Birgitte Prins
- John Martinus
