= Beate Bille (actress) =

Danish actress (born 1976)

- Born: Beate Karoline Bille; 17 November 1976 (age 49)
- Occupation: Actress
- Spouse: Magnus Nordenhof Jønck (m. 2013)
- Children: 2
- Parents: Joen Bille (father); Bente Scavenius (mother)

Beate Karoline Bille (born 17 November 1976) is a Danish actress and member of the Bille noble family.

== About ==
She has received a Shooting Star Award at the 2006 Berlin International Film Festival. She has had roles in several Danish films and television series, including the leading role in Per Fly's 2005 film Manslaughter, for which she received the Shooting Star Award. The film also received the Nordic Council Film Prize and multiple awards at the 2006 Bodil Awards. In Manslaughter, she portrays a young left-wing activist involved in an affair with her former teacher, portrayed by Jesper Christensen. In A Quiet Love (2005), she plays opposite Hanna Schygulla. She has appeared in Emmy winning Danish TV series such as Unit One, Taxa, Ørnen, and Nikolaj og Julie.

She attended the Danish National School of Theatre from 2000 to 2004.

She is the daughter of actor Joen Bille and art historian Bente Scavenius, and is a member of the ancient noble Bille family. Her grandmother is novelist Irene Ibsen Bille, a daughter of the Norwegian Prime Minister Sigurd Ibsen and granddaughter of Henrik Ibsen and Bjørnstjerne Bjørnson. She is also a descendant of Tycho Brahe, whose mother was also named Beate Bille.

== Filmography ==
- Nattens engel (1998)
- Dybt vand (1999)
- Taxa (TV) (1999)
- Nikolaj og Julie (TV) (2003)
- A Quiet Love (2005)
- Manslaughter (2005)
- Ørnen (TV) (2005)
- Fidibus (2006)
- Island of Lost Souls (2007)
- Anna Pihl (2008)
- Deroute (TV) (2008)
- Blå mænd (2008)
- Harmsaga (short film) (2008)
- Der Kommissar und das Meer (TV) (2008)
- Wallander (TV) (2009)
- Lærkevej (TV) (2009)
- Mørk & Jul (TV) (2009)
- Großstadtrevier (TV) (2012)
- Black Widows (TV) (2016–2017)

== Awards ==
- Shooting Star Award, 2006
