= Bente Scavenius =

Danish art historian, art critic and author

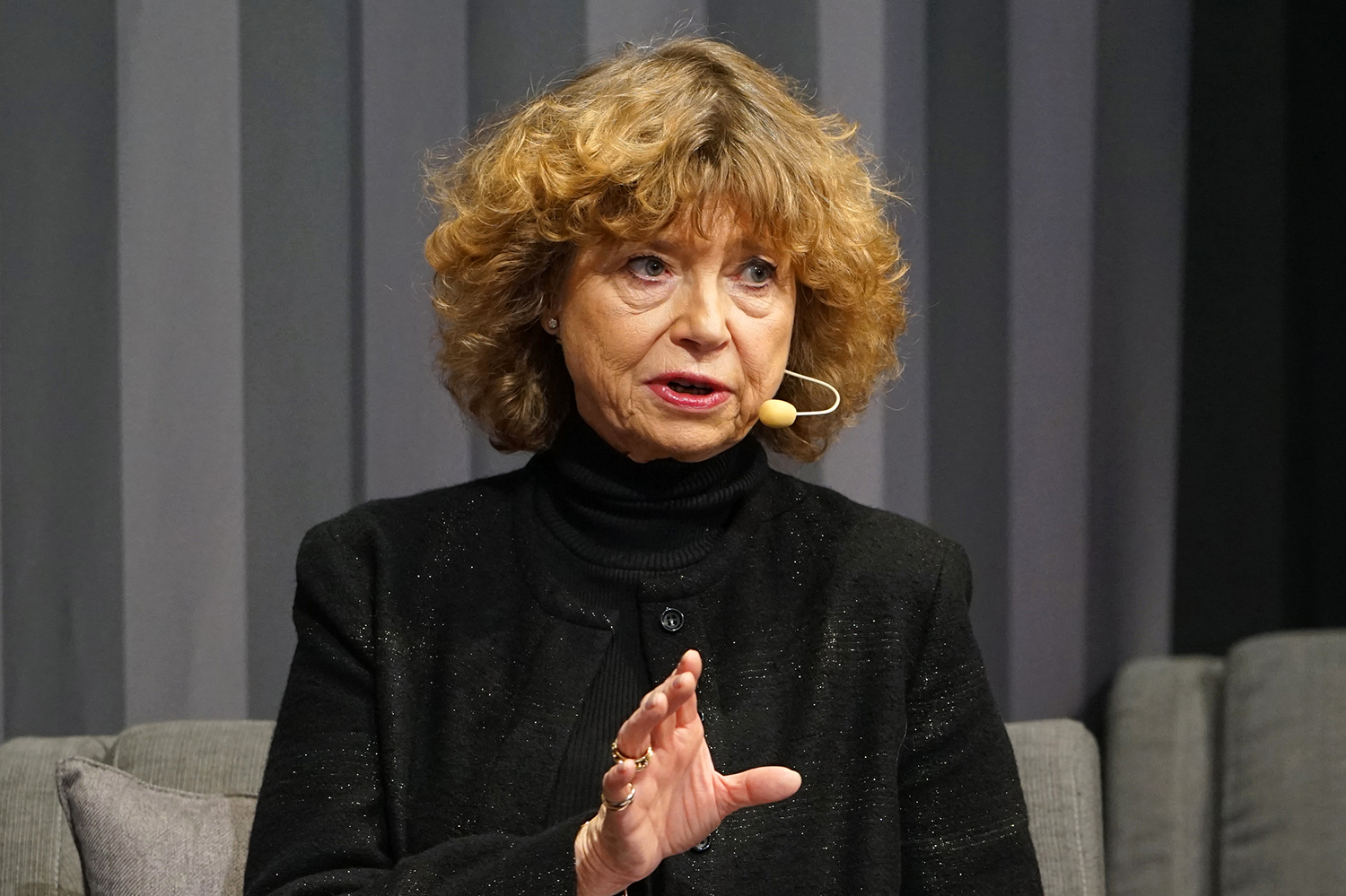
Bente Scavenius (2017)

Bente Christina Brønnum Scavenius (born 12 December 1944, in Stockholm) is a Danish art historian, art critic and author. She has taught at the University of Copenhagen and Aarhus University, and has written more than 20 books. She has also been a member of numerous public and private committees and boards of directors of cultural institutions in Denmark.

She is the daughter of land owner Carl Christian Brønnum Scavenius, who owned Klintholm Gods, and a relative of former Prime Minister Erik Scavenius. She is married to actor Joen Bille (of the noble Bille family), who is a son of Irene Ibsen Bille and a descendant of Henrik Ibsen, Sigurd Ibsen and Bjørnstjerne Bjørnson. She is the mother of actress Beate Bille.

Scavenius has a mag.art. degree in history of art.

== Honours and awards ==
- 2012 – Order of the Dannebrog
- 2004 – N. L. Høyen Medal
- 2003 – Ingeniør B Sunds kulturpris
- 2002 – Ole Haslunds Hæderslegat
- 1997 – Den Danske Publicistklubs jubilæumslegat
- 1998 – Ørelæge Valdemar Klein og Hustru Læge Johanne Kleins Legat
- 1995 – Møn-Prisen
- 1994 – Denmark's candidate for Europe's Women's Prize
- 1992 – Rosenkjærprisen
- 1991 – H.K.H. Prinsens Fond
- 1984 – Ole Haslunds Kunstnerfond

== Bibliography ==
=== Books ===
- Scavenius, Bente (1983). Fremsyn, snæversyn: Dansk dagbladskuntkritik 1880-1901 [Foresight, narrow-mindedness: Danish daily newspaper criticism 1880-1901]. Borgen. ISBN 978-8741855257.
- Scavenius, Bente (1989). At læse billeder [Reading pictures]. Borgen. ISBN 87-418-8495-7.
- Scavenius, Bente (1991). Den Frie Udstilling i 100 år [The Free Exhibition for 100 years]. Borgen. ISBN 87-418-6082-9.
- Scavenius, Bente (2004). Se på verdenskunst i Danmark [World art in Denmark] (2 ed.). Oslo, Norway: Gyldendal Norsk Forlag. ISBN 87-02-02980-4.
- Scavenius, Bente (1997). Fredensborg Slotshave [Fredensborg Castle Garden]. Oslo, Norway: Gyldendal. OCLC 39627758.
- Scavenius, Bente (1994). Guldalderhistorier, 20 nærbilleder af perioden 1800-1850 [Golden Age Stories, 20 close-ups of the period 1800-1850]. Oslo, Norway: Gyldendal. ISBN 9788700190528.
- Den lille billedkunst
- Hammershøis København
- Verdenskunst i Danmark
- Danmarks dejligste haver
