= Hans Povelsson Paus =

Norwegian priest and poet

Sir Hans Povelsson Paus (Note: As a member of the clergy, one of the two privileged estates, he was styled as herr in Norwegian or Dominus in Latin, conventionally rendered as Sir as an ecclesiastical title in English; the Norwegian style herr was (until the 19th century) reserved for members of the clergy and the nobility and may be translated as "Sir" or "Lord"; its predecessor sira (sir) had been introduced as the style for clergymen in Norway in the 13th century and gradually been replaced by the Norwegianized version herr from the 15th century.)
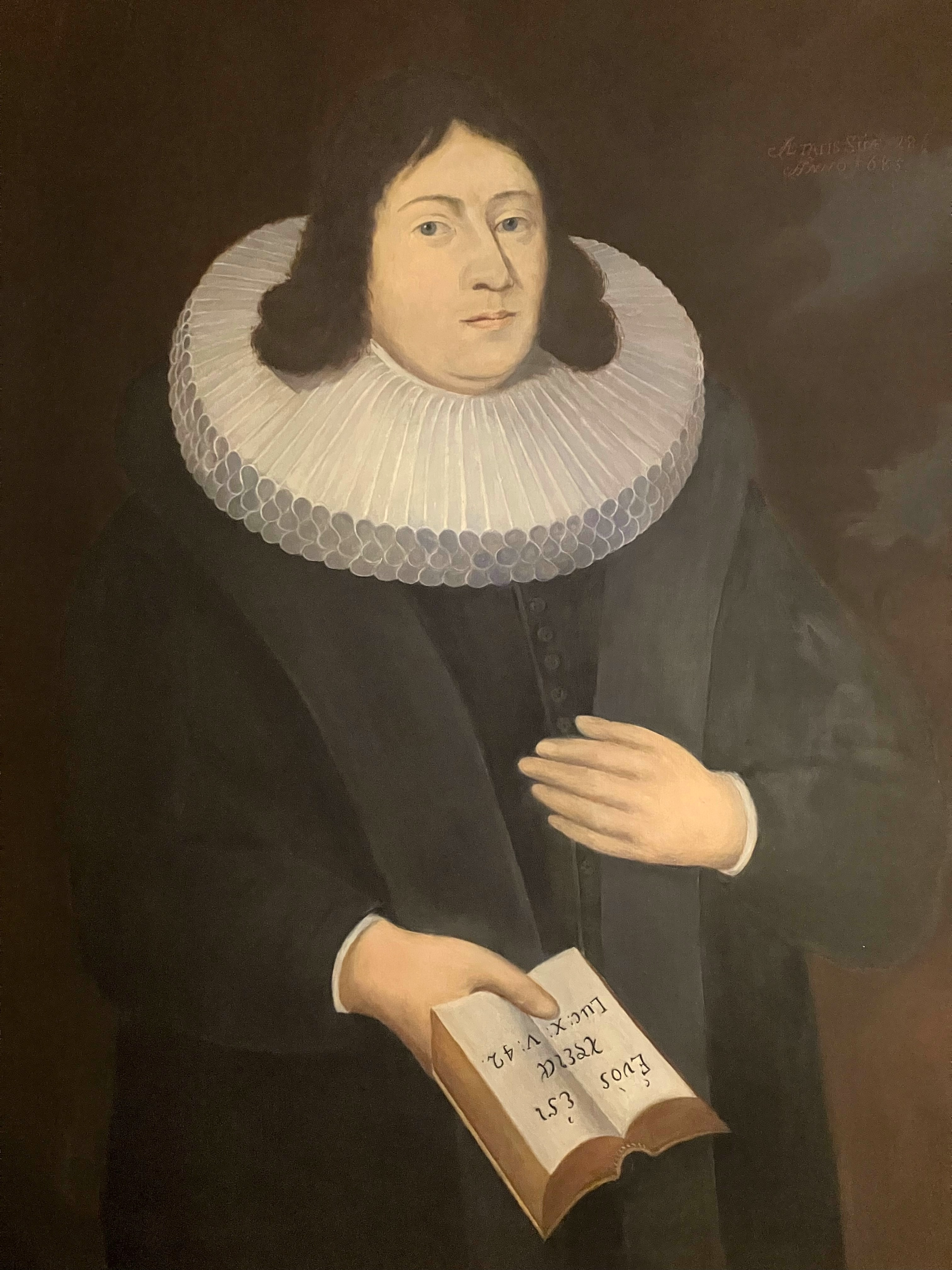
- Hans Paus; painting at Ask Manor
- Born: 1656; Hjartdal
- Died: March 18, 1715 (aged 58–59); Kviteseid
- Education: University of Copenhagen
- Occupation: Cleric
- Father: Paul Peterson Paus

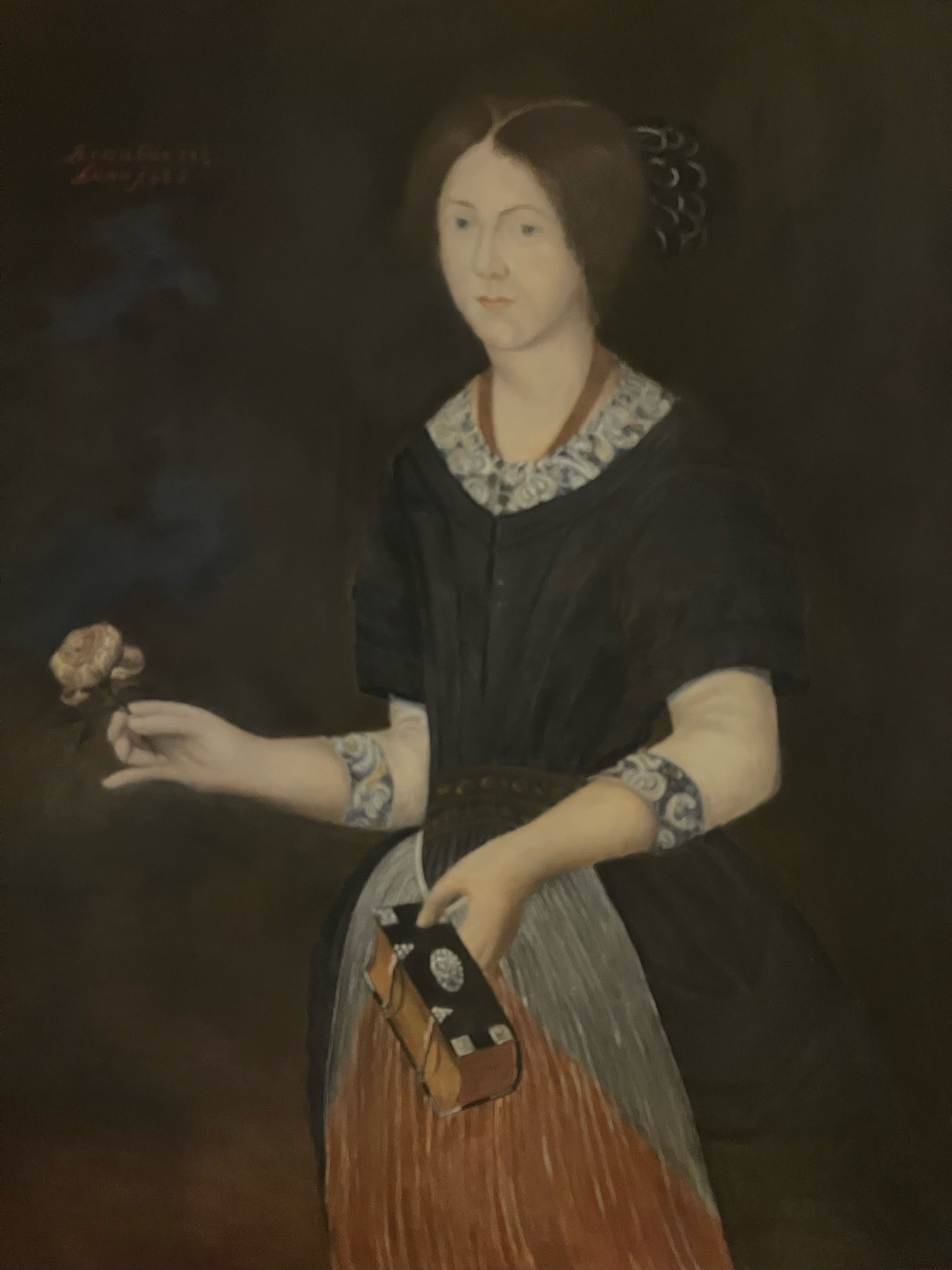
Susanne Paus, painting at Ask Manor

Sir Hans Povelsson Paus (1656, Hjartdal – 18 March 1715) was a Norwegian priest and poet. He served as the parish priest in Kviteseid prestegjeld from 1683 until his death. A popular man in his parish who learned the local dialect (at a time when most church officials and civil servants used Danish as a working language), he is noted for being the first to write poetry in dialect in Norway. His poem Stolt Anne (ca. 1700), written in the Kviteseid dialect, became a popular folk song in Telemark. 12 verses were included in Norske Folkeviser (1853) by Magnus Brostrup Landstad and Henrik Ibsen, a relative of Hans Paus, paraphrased the poem in the drama Lady Inger of Ostrat. The poem honored Anne Clausdatter, the owner of Borgestad Manor and a relative of Paus. She rewarded him with an agricultural property (Bukkøy) for it. He owned several agricultural properties in Kviteseid.

Hans Paus was the son of Povel Pedersson Paus (1625–1682), parish priest in Hjartdal prestegjeld, and Ingrid Corneliusdatter Trinnepol, who belonged to the Skien patriciate who had made a fortune in the sawmill industry (her family might originate in Trinitapoli, Italy). Hans Paus married Susanne Amundsdatter Morland, daughter of the provost of Øvre Telemark Amund Hanssøn Morland. He succeeded his father-in-law as parish priest in Kviteseid. Amund Morland, of Danish origin, had succeeded Hans Paus' grandfather Peder Paus (born 1590) as the Kviteseid parish priest and provost; hence, the Paus and Morland families have been referred to as a dynasty of priests in Øvre Telemark. Hans Paus' maternal grandparents were timber merchant, sawmill owner and councilman in Skien, Cornelius Jansen Trinnepol (1611–1678) and Anne Iversdatter (1605–1642), a daughter of councilman Iver Christensen and Margrethe von Ansbach. Susanne's maternal grandparents Christen Andersen and Anne Gundersdatter owned Borgestad Manor.

Original painted portraits from 1685 of Hans and Susanne came into the possession of Christopher Tostrup Paus and are today housed at Herresta in Sweden.

Hans Paus was the brother of the judge of Øvre Telemark, Cornelius Paus (1662–1723), who used a coat of arms featuring a wild man.

== Literature ==
- D. A. Seip i Norsk Biografisk Leksikon, bd. 10 (1969)
- Landstad, Magnus Brostrup: Norske folkeviser (1853)
- Berge, Rikard: Bygdedikting fraa Telemarki (bd. 11, 1918)
