= Anne Clausdatter =

Norwegian landowner

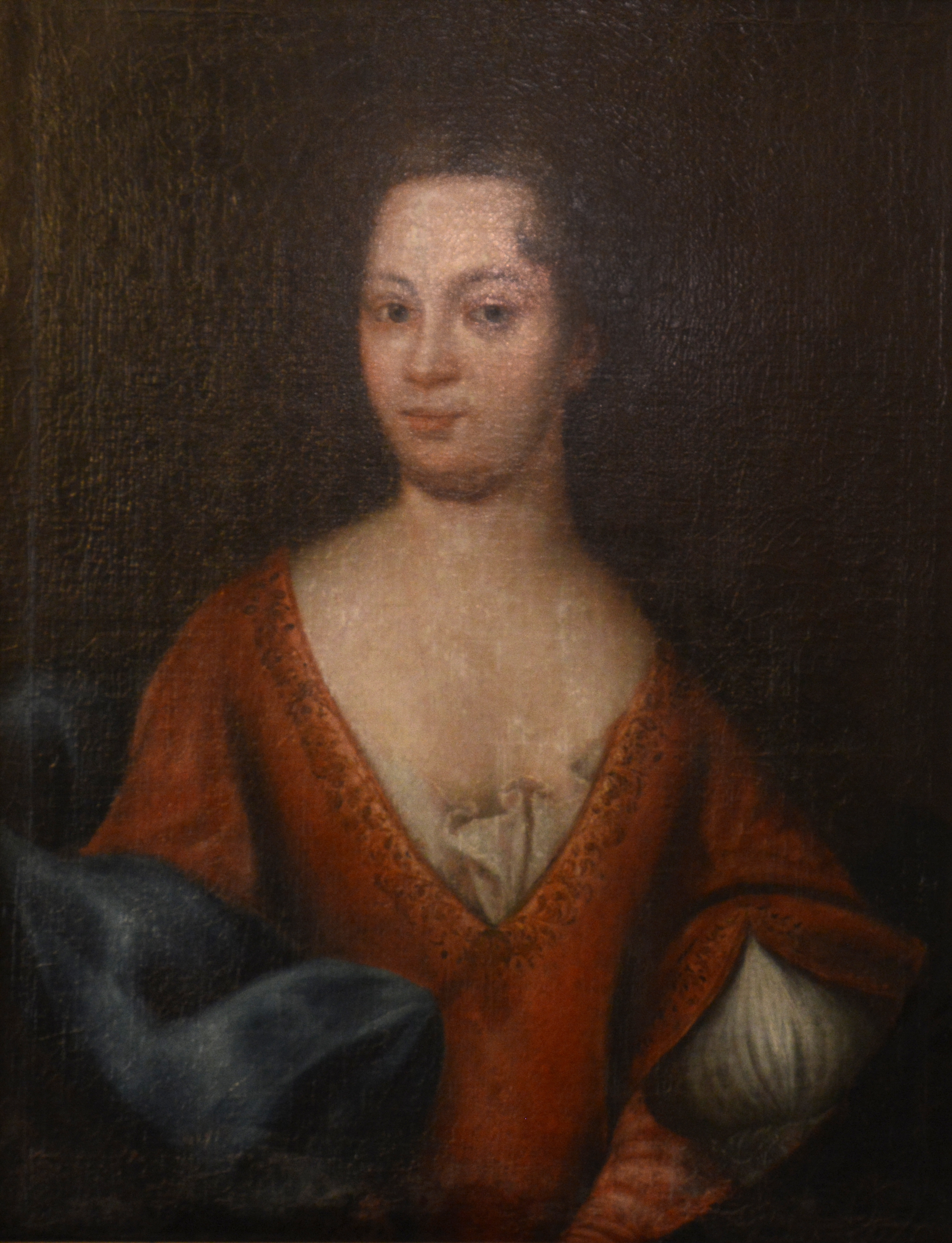
Portrait of Anne Clausdatter, Borgestad Manor (Foto: Cecilie Authen, Telemark Museum)

Anne Clausdatter, also known as Anne Arnold and Anna Clausdatter (born 5 June 1659 in Skien, died 11 April 1713 at Borgestad Manor), was a Norwegian landowner; owner of Borgestad Manor in Skien, one of the largest estates of Bratsberg.

Anne Clausdatter was descended from the leading land owners and timber merchants of the Grenland area, and was married first to Stig Andersen Tønsberg (died 1690), and then to General Johan Arnold (died 1709).

== Legacy ==
Today, she is remembered i.a. as the title character of the poem Stolt Anne (ca. 1700) by Hans Paus, who was married to her first cousin. The poem portrays her as a generous person who was well liked by the population of Telemark. The poem is also notable for being the first written in dialect in Norway, and 12 verses were included in Norske Folkeviser (1853) by Magnus Brostrup Landstad.
