= Joen Bille =

Danish actor

Joen Steensen Bille (born 11 April 1944 in Frederiksberg) is a Danish actor. He is a member of the noble Bille family, and is also a great-grandson of Henrik Ibsen and Bjørnstjerne Bjørnson. He is the son of Irene Ibsen and grandson of Norwegian Prime Minister Sigurd Ibsen. He is married to art historian Bente Scavenius and is the father of actress Beate Bille.

Joen Bille has been a theatre actor in Denmark since the early 1970s, and has had roles in a number of TV series.

== Villa Ibsen ==
In 2014, he published the book Villa Ibsen, which deals with his famous family. The book received mixed reviews, particularly highlighting portraits of the author's grandparents Sigurd and Bergliot Ibsen as interesting. In the depiction of the great-grandparents, Bille adds little new and largely builds on older portrayals and popular perceptions of Ibsen, which have been criticized in recent historical Ibsen scholarship. Thus, the biography conveys myths about Henrik Ibsen's difficult childhood, conflict-ridden relationship with his father or Knud Ibsen as a tyrannical alcoholic, myths that were refuted in Jørgen Haave's book Familien Ibsen [The Ibsen Family] (2017). Contrary to Bille's claims, Haave notes that Ibsen had a comfortable childhood, was pampered by his father and was an arrogant child with a strong patrician identity.

== Filmography ==
- Mazurka på sengekanten as Torben, 1970
- Pigen og drømmeslottet as Bruno Børgesen, 1974
- Blind makker, 1976
- Kassen stemmer as Bent, 1976
- Carmen og Babyface, 1995
- Kun en pige, 1995
