= Michael Soussan =

Reporter, writer and whistleblower

- Born: 1973 (age 52–53)
- Education: Brown University; Sciences Po
- Occupations: Reporter writer
- Known for: Whistleblowing Oil-for-Food Program
- Notable work: Backstabbing for Beginners: My Crash Course in International Diplomacy
- Website: michaelsoussan.com

Michael Soussan (born 1973) is a Danish-born reporter, writer and whistleblower. He lives in Los Angeles, California. As a journalist and commentator he has contributed to The New York Times, The New Republic, The Wall Street Journal, and many others, including from Afghanistan and Iraq.

He became famous for his 2008 book Backstabbing for Beginners: My Crash Course in International Diplomacy, about the widespread corruption and financial abuse, at the highest levels, that he found while working for the Oil-for-Food Program under the United Nations in Iraq. The book was the basis of the 2018 feature film Backstabbing for Beginners, starring Ben Kingsley and Theo James and directed by Per Fly Plejdrup.

== Biography ==
Soussan was born in 1973 in Denmark to a Sephardi Jewish father and a Danish mother. Soussan's father was born in Casablanca and immigrated to Israel. There, he met Soussan's mother, a Danish Protestant who had gone to work on a kibbutz. In Backstabbing for Beginners, Soussan writes "the result [of his parents' relationship] was a child who could best be described as a Sephardic Viking."

Soussan grew up, mostly, in Paris and immigrated to the United States at 18. He attended Brown University, where he co-founded and edited the Brown Journal of World Affairs. He received a Bachelor of Arts degree from the university in 1996. After graduating, Soussan planned to pursue a career in law. After working at a law firm in Washington, D.C., however, he became disillusioned with Capitol Hill and decided to pivot to a career more humanitarian in nature.

At a friend's recommendation, Soussan applied for a job at the United Nations, which would involve traveling to Iraq. Soussan was chosen for the job, in part because he did not hold American or British citizenship. In a 2018 interview, Soussan reflected on his outlook at the time, stating "At Brown, they teach you to be idealistic — but they don’t teach you how the world works. I had to find that out."

Soussan arrived in Iraq in 1997 where he worked for the Oil-for-Food Program. For much of his time in the country, Soussan worked as the assistant to Benon Sevan, the Armenian Cypriot administrator of the program. According to Backstabbing for Beginners, Soussan was present at the alleged 1998 deal in which Sevan began receiving bribes from the government of Baathist Iraq.
