= Synnøve Macody Lund =

Norwegian journalist, film critic, model, and actress (born 1976)

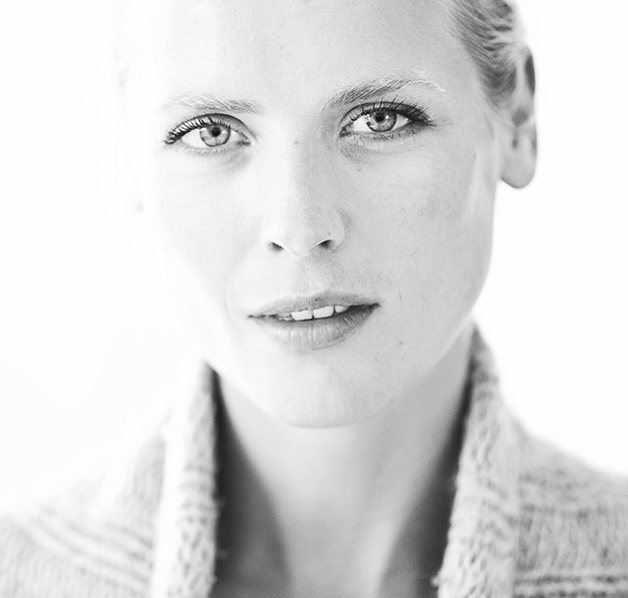
- Synnøve Macody Lund in 2011
- Born: 24 May 1976 (age 50); Stord Municipality, Norway
- Occupation: Actress
- Years active: 2011–present
- Known for: Ragnarok • Saw X
- Height: 182.9 cm (6 ft 0 in)
- Spouse: Christer Falck (2005-2011)
- Children: 2

Synnøve Macody Lund (born 24 May 1976) is a Norwegian journalist, film critic, model, and actress. As of 2020, she appears in the 2020 Netflix series Ragnarok and the 2020 Sky TV series Riviera.

== Early life ==
Lund was born on 24 May 1976 in Stord Municipality, Norway. She has a degree in television production and film studies.

== Career ==
Lund has worked as a film critic for NATT&DAG (Norwegian; translation, Night&Day), and as a journalist, after earlier work as a fashion model. She has been working as an actress since 2011, appearing first as the character Diana Brown in Morten Tyldum's BAFTA Award film Headhunters (Norwegian, Hodejegerne), an action thriller based on the 2008 Jo Nesbø novel of the same name. The BAFTA Award nomination was for Best Foreign Language Film. Lund's entry into acting is described, thus, by Headhunters co-star Aksel Hennie: "When I first read the script I pictured Synnove because I knew her from before and she had reviewed every single film I've done and Morten (the director) asked me, 'Is she a film critic? Yeah. Has she reviewed any of my films? Yeah. Was the review good? Yeah. OK then we can try her', So we tried her and she came so prepared—more prepared than any actress."

Her subsequent roles have included the role of Sara in the short Sandslottet (2014), and as the character Tonje Sandvik in the drama series Frikjent (2015) alongside Nicolai Cleve Broch. She appears as the murderous Johanne Rønningen in Black Widows (2016), a remake of the Finnish series Mustat Lesket, distributed by Acorn TV.

She holds the role of Gabriella Grane in the 2018 film The Girl in the Spider's Web, based on the novel of the same name by David Lagercrantz, which in turn is based on characters in the book series by Stieg Larsson.

As of 2012, there was a report that Lund had contracted with the publisher Samlaget to produce a novel, on subjects that were at the time undisclosed. Her novel "Personar du kanskje kjenner" (translation "People you may know") was published in 2016.

In December 2022, Lund was confirmed by Deadline Hollywood to have signed on to appear in Saw X, the tenth installment of the Saw film series, released in September 2023.

== Filmography ==
=== Film ===
List of films and roles
Year	Title	Role	Notes
2011	Headhunters	Diana	
2017	The Ash Lad: In the Hall of the Mountain King	Queen Victoria	
2018	The Girl in the Spider's Web	Gabriella Grane	
2023	Saw X	Cecilia Pederson	

=== Television ===
List of television appearances and roles
Year	Title	Role	Notes
2015–2016	Frikjent	Tonje Sandvik	Main role
2016–2017	Black Widows	Johanne Rønningen	Main role
2018	Nielegalni	Linda Boman	Main role
2020	Bloodride	Annelise	1 episode
2020	Riviera	Alex Harewood	8 episodes
2020–2023	Ragnarok	Ran	Main role
2023	Everybody Loves Diamonds	Judith DeWitt	Main role
2025	The Wheel of Time	Melindhra	Season 3, 4 episodes

=== Video games ===
- Battlefield V (2018), Astrid
