= Irene Ibsen Bille =

Norwegian novelist and playwright

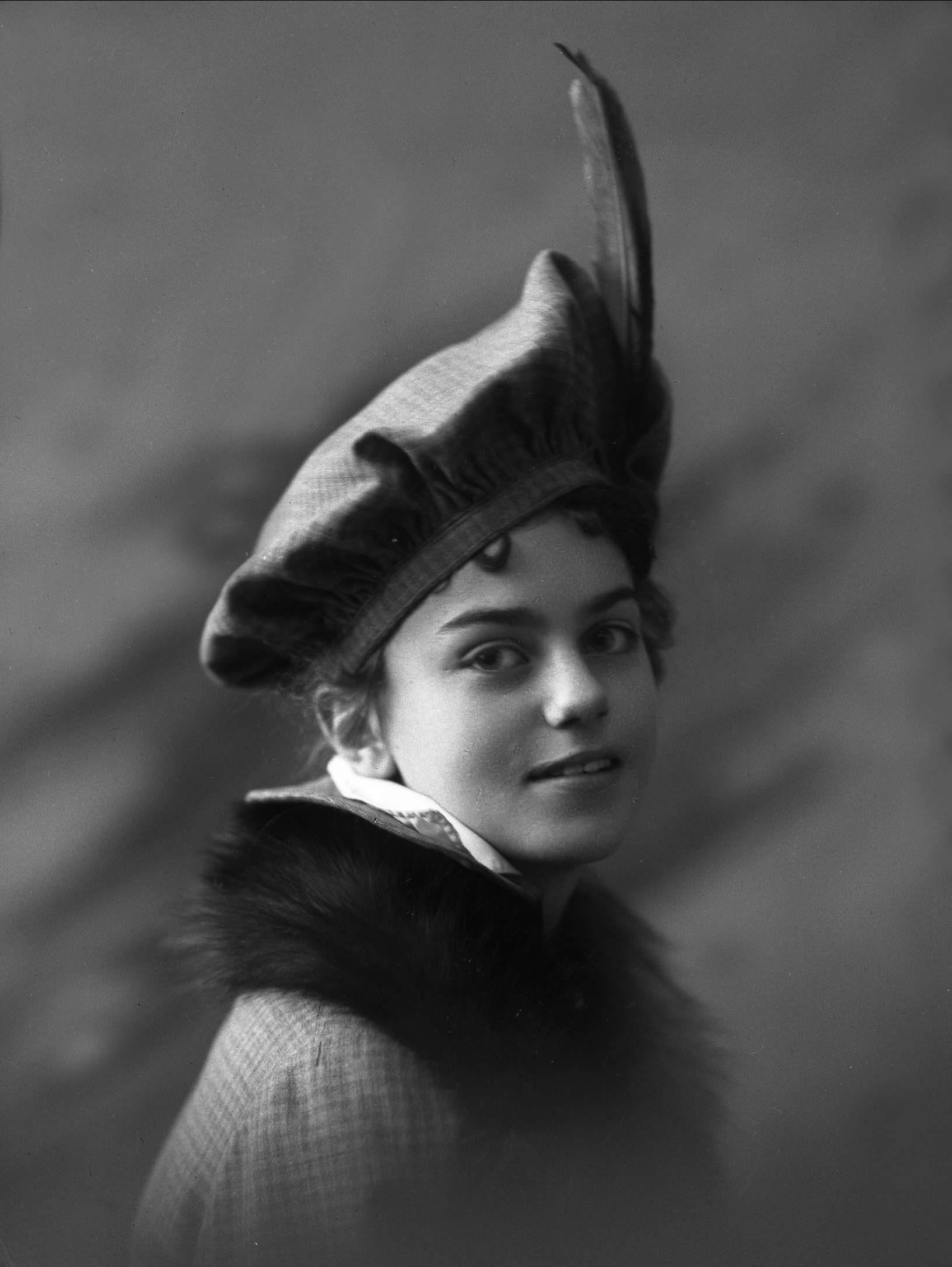
Irene Ibsen, photographed by Gustav Borgen

Irene Ibsen Bille (10 September 1901 – 22 February 1985) (née Irene Ibsen) was a Norwegian novelist and playwright.

She was born in Kristiania as a daughter of Prime Minister Sigurd Ibsen. She was a sister of Tancred Ibsen, paternal granddaughter of world-famous writer Henrik Ibsen and Suzannah Ibsen (née Thoresen), daughter of Bergliot Ibsen (née Bjørnson) and maternal granddaughter of Bjørnstjerne Bjørnson and Karoline Bjørnson (née Reimers).

Irene Ibsen married Danish writer Steen Andersen Josias Christopher Bille (called Josias), a member of the ancient noble Bille family, in 1930, and moved to Denmark. Her first dramatic work, Uten ansikt ('Faceless'), was published here. Kysset ('The Kiss') followed in 1965. In the same year she issued the novel Det leende vindu ('The Laughing Window'). She died in February 1985.

== Issue ==
Ibsen Bille had three children from two marriages: Suzanna (with first husband, Mario Rocco, the daughter was named Rosetta), and Anders and Joen (with second husband Josias). Roughly a third of Henrik Ibsen's living descendants come from Irene's grandchildren and great-grandchildren.

- Suzannah Ibsen (1922-1979), married Ib Bering Jensen (1921-2012)
  - Thorkel Josias Bering-Jensen (1959-) and Jeanette Uhrenholt (1968-)
    - Chanel Uhrenholt (1986-)
    - Francisca Uhrenholt (1990-)
  - Vitus Mario Bering-Jensen (1959-)
    - Angelo Bering Jensen (1983-)
    - Valentino Bering Jensen (1986-)
    - Jonas Vitus Bering-Jensen (2003-)
    - Leon Bering-Jensen (2016-)
- Anders Steensen Bille (1940–2011), married Mona Skov Hansen (1941-)
  - Steen Andersen Oluf Bille (1964-), married Geraldine Dumas (1975-)
    - Anders Steensen Victorien Bille (2009-)
    - Arsène Constant Eske Bille (2011-)
  - Bernt Ivar Bille (1968-), married Betina Laulund Henriksen
    - Josias Christian Bille (2000-)
    - Emerentze Caroline Bille (2003-)
- Joen Steensen Bille (1944–), married Bente Scavenius (1944–)
  - Beate Bille (1976–), married Magnus Jønck
  - Peder Bille (1983-)
