= Charlotte Fich =

Danish actress (born 1961)

- Born: 26 September 1961 (age 65); Dragør, Denmark
- Occupation: Actress
- Spouse: Per Fly
- Children: 2

Charlotte Fich (born 26 September 1961) is a Danish stage, film, and television actress. She is known for her role as police officer Ingrid Dahl in the Emmy-awarded Danish television series Unit One (2000–2004), and as prison governor Gert in the 2023 prison drama miniseries Prisoner (Huset).

== Early life and education ==
Charlotte Fich was born on 26 September 1961 in Dragør, Denmark, the daughter of architect Mogens Fich and teacher Benni Pedersen.

She studied acting at the Aarhus Theatre Acting School, graduating in 1989.

== Career ==
Fich started her acting career in theatre, being affiliated with Aarhus Theatre until 1993. She performed in many musicals, including Den Forbudte Planet ("The Forbidden Planet"). Moving to Copenhagen, where she was cast in major roles at several Copenhagen theatres. These included Mysterier ("Mysteries") at Husets Teater, Pelle Erobreren ("Pelle the Conqueror") at Folketeatret, Det blir' ikke med mig som Ofelia ("It will not be with me as Ophelia") with the touring theatre group Det Danske Teater (a national touring theatre), and the well-known musical Chicago at Det Ny Teater.

Fich became widely known for her role as police officer Ingrid Dahl in the Danish television series Unit One (Danish: Rejseholdet) (2000–2004), which won the Emmy Award for Best Drama Series in 2002.

She has also featured in several feature films, including Manslaughter (Drabet; 2005), Just Another Love Story (Kærlighed på film; 2007), and A Second Chance (En chance til; 2015).

Fich played Jasmine in the comedy series Lærkevej (2009-2010), and featured in the hit political drama series Borgen (2010-2022).

In 2017 she played Lily Irsinger in Mercur (released as Something's Rockin'), written by Søren Frellesen and directed by Charlotte Sachs Bostrup and Mogens Hagedorn. The 10-episode series tells the story of legendary pirate radio station Radio Mercur.

She played a major role as the prison governor Gert in the 2023 Danish miniseries Prisoner (Huset).

== Personal life ==
Fich married Danish film director Per Fly on 22 July 2000. They have two sons.

== Awards ==
- 2005: Bodil Award for best supporting actress, Manslaughter (Drabet)
- 2005: Robert award for best supporting actress, Manslaughter
- 2007: Bodil Award for best supporting actress, Just Another Love Story (Kærlighed på film)

== Selected filmography ==
=== Television ===
- Taxa (1997)
- Unit One (Rejseholdet; 2000–2003)
- Lærkevej (2009-2010)
- Borgen (2010-2022)
- Black Widows (2016–2017)
- Something's Rockin' (Mercur; 2017)
- Prisoner (Huset; 2023)

=== Film ===
- Kalder Katrine (1993)
- Jul i Juleland (1993)
- Det store flip (1997)
- Deadline (1998)
- Pas på mor (1999)
- Som man behager (2003)
- Se dagens lys (2003)
- Manslaughter (2005)
- Kinamand (2005)
- Kærlighed på film (Just Another Love Story) (2007)
- Worlds Apart (2008)
- Headhunter (2009)
- Hold Me Tight (2010)
- All for One (2011)
- Fuglejagten (2012), as Pia
- A Second Chance (En chance til; 2015), as Dommer
- Mennesker bliver spist (2015), as Hanne
- Hele vejen (2025), as Vicky
