= Stolt Anne =

Poem by Hans Paus

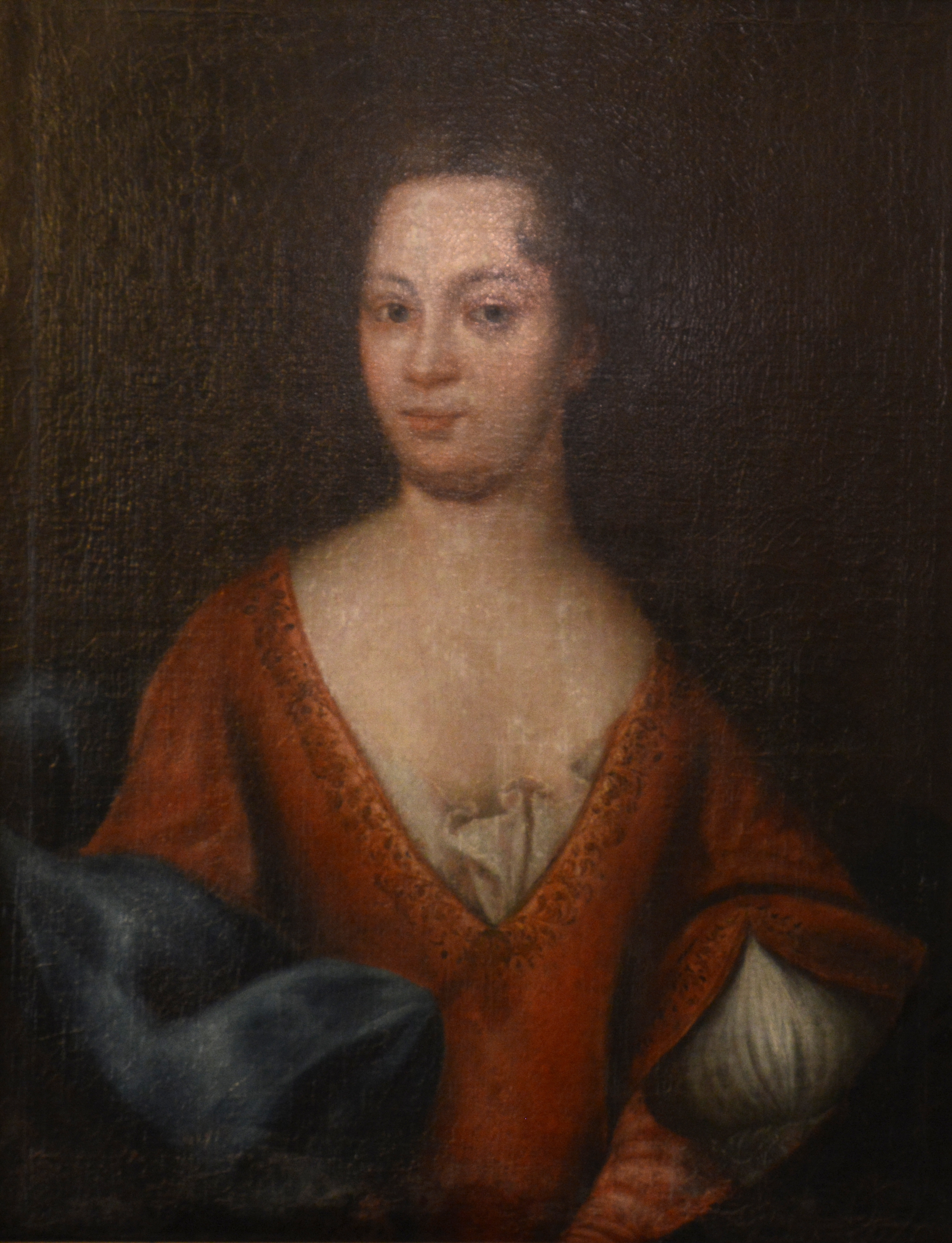
Portrait of Anne Clausdatter, Borgestad gård (Foto: Cecilie Authen, Telemark Museum)

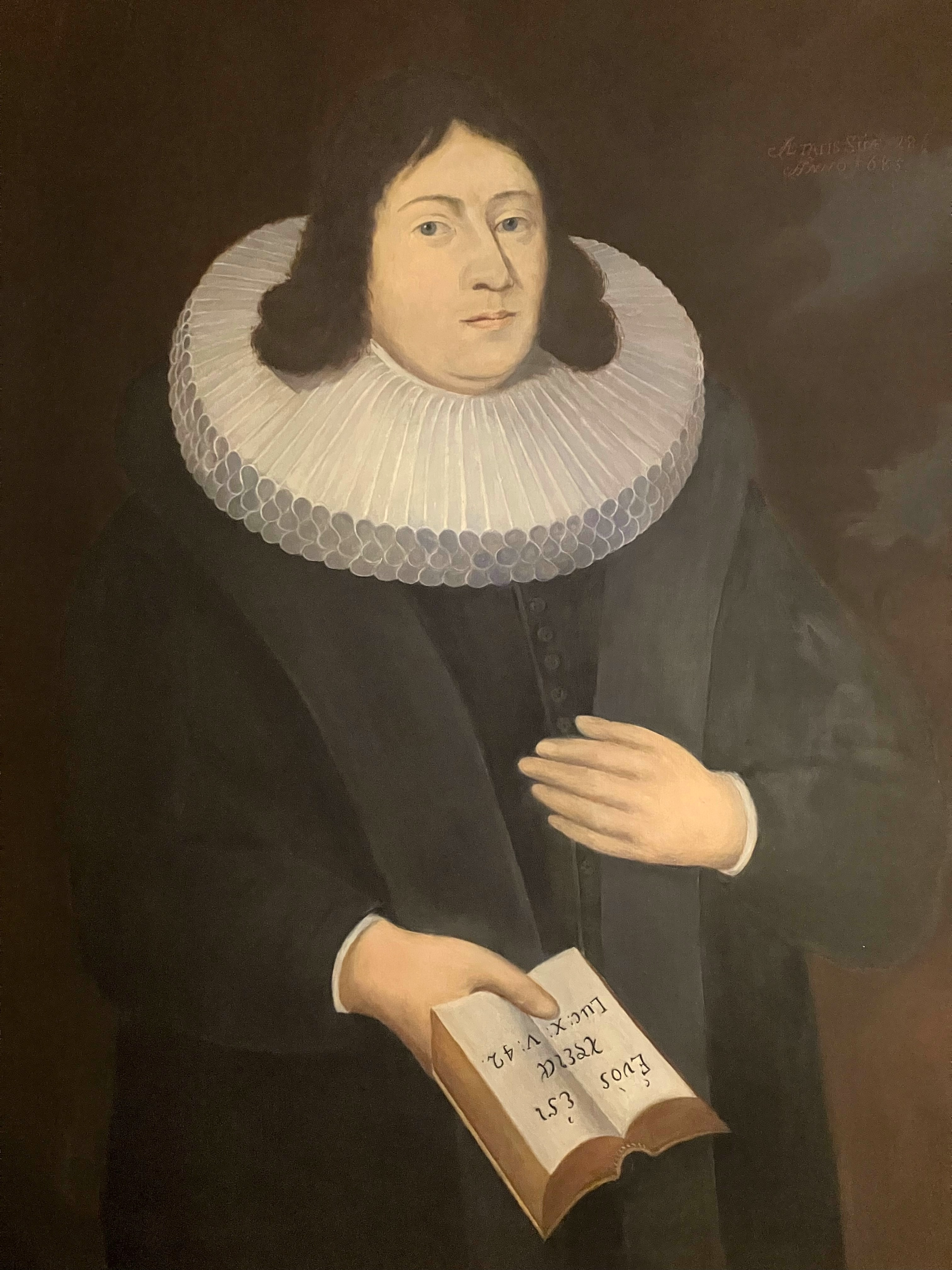
Hans Paus (1656–1715), author of Stolt Anne

Stolt Anne is a poem written by Hans Paus, parish priest in Kviteseid prestegjeld, around 1700. The title character is Anne Clausdatter, owner of Borgestad Manor, one of the region's largest estates, and a first cousin of Paus' wife Susanne. The poem portrays Anne as a generous person who was well liked by the population of Telemark. The poem is noted for being the first time Telemark dialect was used in poetry in Norway. Anne gave Hans Paus an island, Bukkøy in Kviteseid (400 daa), to express her gratitude for the poem.

12 verses were included in Norske Folkeviser (1853) by Magnus Brostrup Landstad. Henrik Ibsen, a relative of Hans Paus, paraphrased the poem in the drama Lady Inger of Ostrat.
