= The Ibsen Family =

Book by Jørgen Haave

- Norwegian language book cover titled Familien Ibsen (2017)
- Author: Jørgen Haave
- Original title: Familien Ibsen
- Publisher: Museumsforlaget
- Publication date: 2017
- Publication place: Norway
- ISBN: 9788283050455

The Ibsen Family (Norwegian: Familien Ibsen) is a non-fiction book by Ibsen scholar Jørgen Haave about Henrik Ibsen's family and early life.

== Background ==
It was published by Museumsforlaget and Telemark Museum in 2017. The book is based on a systematic, critical reassessment of the knowledge about Ibsen's childhood and family – that is, the closely intertwined Ibsen, Paus and Altenburg merchant family of Skien, placing it in a broader context. In 2017, Haave was awarded second place in the Researcher's Association's "Hjernekraft" prize for his research on Ibsen. Ibsen scholar Ellen Rees notes that the book is a seminal work in what she describes as a "revolution" in recent historical and biographical research into Ibsen's life, that has refuted many myths previously taken for granted. Haave sees Ibsen's life trajectory in the context of the development of a modern and democratic constitutional state of Norway. He describes Ibsen as a boy who was pampered by his father, who liked to be creative in solitude, and who provoked peers with his superiority and arrogance.
