= Headhunters (film) =

2011 Norwegian film by Morten Tyldum

- Norwegian theatrical poster
- Directed by: Morten Tyldum
- Screenplay by: Lars Gudmestad; Ulf Ryberg
- Based on: Hodejegerne by Jo Nesbø
- Produced by: Marianne Gray; Asle Vatn
- Starring: Aksel Hennie; Synnøve Macody Lund; Nikolaj Coster-Waldau; Eivind Sander; Julie Ølgaard
- Cinematography: John Andreas Andersen
- Edited by: Vidar Flataukan
- Music by: Trond Bjerknes; Jeppe Kaas
- Production companies: Friland Film; Yellow Bird
- Distributed by: Nordisk Film
- Release dates: 26 August 2011 (Norway); 4 November 2011 (Sweden)
- Running time: 100 minutes
- Country: Norway
- Languages: Norwegian; Danish
- Budget: USD 3,636,887
- Box office: USD 18,962,444

Headhunters (Norwegian: Hodejegerne) is a 2011 Norwegian action thriller film based on the 2008 novel of the same name by Jo Nesbø. The film was directed by Morten Tyldum and stars Aksel Hennie, Nikolaj Coster-Waldau and Synnøve Macody Lund. Hennie portrays the successful but insecure corporate recruiter Roger Brown who lives a double life as an art thief to fund his lavish lifestyle. He discovers that one of his job prospects owns a valuable painting and sets out to steal it.

Released in Norway on 26 August 2011, Headhunters was a box office success, receiving critical acclaim, and was nominated for multiple awards, including four Amanda Awards and a BAFTA Award for Best Foreign Language Film.

It is the highest-grossing Norwegian film in history.

== Plot ==
Roger Brown, Norway's most successful headhunter, supports his lavish lifestyle by stealing paintings with his partner, Ove. Roger has a mistress named Lotte, but eventually breaks up with her.

Roger's wife and art gallery owner, Diana, introduces him to Clas Greve, a former executive for GPS tech company HOTE. Roger, in the process of recruiting the CEO of HOTE's rival Pathfinder, considers Clas a suitable candidate.

Clas owns a lost Rubens painting believed to be worth millions. He is also a former member of TRACK, a special forces unit specialized in tracking people, and helped HOTE develop a nanotechnology GPS tracking gel. Roger swaps the Rubens painting with the counterfeit, but discovers Diana's cell phone beside Clas' bed, implying an affair. In retaliation, after a seemingly successful interview with Pathfinder executives, Roger informs Clas that the company is looking for someone else.

The next morning, Roger finds Ove in his car, apparently dead from a poison syringe. Just as Roger tries to dumps the body in a lake, Ove recovers, having not got a full dose of the poison. Roger drives Ove to his cabin and ignores his demands for medical attention, not wanting the police involved. Ove pulls out a gun, causing a shoot-out in which Roger accidentally kills him. Clas has followed him to Ove's cabin, but Roger escapes after a scuffle.

Surmising Clas may have installed a tracker on him, Roger steals Ove's car and spare uniform, then flees to an old farm. Clas arrives at the farm with his dog and murders the farmer. Roger evades them and kills Clas' dog when it attacks him. Driving away in a tractor, Roger sees a pursuing vehicle. In a panic, he falls from the tractor, only to find that his pursuer is a stranger wanting to help.

Waking in a hospital, Roger learns that the police is mistaking him for Ove, and arrest him for the farmer's murder. Driving to the station, the officers pull over to block a truck reported stolen. Clas is driving the truck, and Diana may have helped him by rubbing the GPS gel into Roger's hair. Clas rams the car off a cliff. Playing dead until Clas leaves, Roger shaves his head and hides his hair on an officer's corpse, then swaps clothes with a detective's disfigured body to fake his death.

Roger asks Lotte for help, but she is working for Clas. Clas, who is still secretly employed by HOTE, was planning to use Roger to get the Pathfinder job and steal their technologies. Lotte put the gel in Roger's hair and was to introduce him to Clas. However, Roger ended the affair before that could happen, so Clas used the Rubens painting to meet him through Diana. Lotte attacks him with a knife, causing Roger to fatally shoot her in self-defense. Roger returns home and admits everything to Diana, who apologizes for her affair with Clas. The next morning, Roger enters a morgue to retrieve the remaining evidence linking him to the murders (his cut hair), while Diana contacts Clas to ostensibly resume their affair.

While cleaning Ove's cabin of evidence, Roger is confronted by Clas, who tracked the gel in the cut hair. Clas tries to shoot Roger but fails. Roger fatally wounds Clas with a gun, and explains that Diana loaded Clas' gun with blanks. Ove's security camera records Clas shooting and getting shot, but not Roger. The footage, combined with evidence planted by Roger, suggests that Ove and Clas were art thieves who killed the farmer, Lotte, and finally each other. The police ignore the inconsistencies (Ove's and Clas' times of death not matching) because leaving the case unsolved would harm star detective Brede Sperre's growing reputation.

Later, Roger and Diana sell their house. Roger returns to work, giving the Pathfinder job to an applicant he previously rejected and robbed.

== Cast ==
- Aksel Hennie as Roger Brown
- Synnøve Macody Lund as Diana
- Nikolaj Coster-Waldau as Clas Greve
- Eivind Sander as Ove Kjikerud
- Julie Ølgaard as Lotte Madsen
- Reidar Sørensen as Brede Sperre
- Kyrre Haugen Sydnessas Jeremias Lander
- Mads Mogeland as Joar Sunded
- Baard Owe as Sindre Aa
- Torgrim Mellum Stene as Atle Nerum
- Mattis Herman Nyquist as Ferdinand
- Nils Jørgen Kaalstad as Stig
- Joachim Rafaelsen as Brugd
- Gunnar Skramstad Johnsen as Eskild Monsen
- Lars Skramstad Johnsen as Endride Monsen

== Production and remake ==
The Swedish production company Yellow Bird acquired the film rights to Jo Nesbø's 2008 novel Headhunters in 2009. It was the first of Nesbø's novels to be turned into a film. The film was shot in and around Oslo on a budget of 30 million NOK over 40 days. The film lacked aerial shots that they needed but ran out of money and instead archive footage scenes from the Swedish film The Girl with the Dragon Tattoo was used and was digitally altered to change the type of car.

A Hollywood remake of Headhunters was planned, with the British journalist and screenwriter Sacha Gervasi writing the screenplay. The rights to the English-language remake were sold to the American film studio Summit Entertainment in 2011 while the Norwegian film was still in production.

== Music ==
Tracks used in the movie include:

- "Weathervane" by Weathervane (writing name of Jimmy Gnecco and Paul Waaktaar-Savoy) - over the end credits
- "Sleep Ferrari" published by Universal Publishing Production Music (no artist given)
- "Come Arround" [sic] by Goran Obad and Henrik Skarm

== Release ==
The film was released in Norway on 26 August 2011 and was seen by 104,000 Norwegian moviegoers in its opening weekend, making it the second best opening weekend in Norwegian history, after Max Manus. It was by far the most-watched domestic film of the year, with 557,086 tickets sold at the cinema, and the second most-watched including foreign films, only beaten by Harry Potter and the Deathly Hallows – Part 2.

== Box office ==
In its opening weekend in Norway, the film earned $1,789,809, good enough to top the Norwegian box office rankings. The film stayed at the top spot in the Norwegian box office rankings for four straight weekends. It had eventually earned $8,877,056 upon its departure from Norwegian theaters.

It also earned an additional $10,085,388 in other territories and $1,200,010 in the United States for a worldwide box office gross of $18,962,444 against a production budget of $3,636,887, making it the highest-grossing film in Norwegian cinema history.

== Reception ==
Headhunters received overwhelmingly positive critical reviews upon release. Rotten Tomatoes reports an approval rating of 93% based on 98 reviews, with an average rating of 7.63 out of 10. The consensus reads: "Grisly, twisty, and darkly comic, Headhunters is an exhilaratingly oddball take on familiar thriller elements". On Metacritic, the film has a score of 72 out of 100, based on reviews from 26 critics.

Roger Ebert of the Chicago Sun-Times gave the film three and a half out of four, praising the film as "an argument for the kinds of thrillers I miss. It entertains with story elements, in which the scares evolve from human behavior. Unlike too many thrillers that depend on stunts, special effects, and the Queasy cam, this one devises a plot where it matters what happens. It's not all kinetic energy".

In Norway the film got favourable reviews; with most reviewers following the "die throw" system, where one is worst and six is best, the vast majority gave five. The die throw of five was issued by VG, Dagbladet, Aftenposten, Bergens Tidende, Bergensavisen, Stavanger Aftenblad, Dagsavisen, Fædrelandsvennen, Haugesunds Avis and Hamar Arbeiderblad. The die throw of four was issued by Adresseavisen. and Klassekampen. Dagens Næringsliv, called the film "highly acceptable" genre action with a sympathetic lead character.

=== Accolades ===
Headhunters was the first Norwegian film to be nominated for a BAFTA (in the category Best Film Not in the English Language). The film was also nominated for four Amanda Awards: People's Amanda (audience vote), Best Actor, Best Direction and Best Visual Effects, but not for Best Norwegian Film, leading to criticism of the Amanda jury.

Year	Award	Category	Recipient	Result
2012	Amanda Award	People's Amanda		Won
2012	Amanda Award	Best Actor	Aksel Hennie	Nominated
2012	Amanda Award	Best Direction	Morten Tyldum	Nominated
2012	Amanda Award	Best Visual Effects	Lars Erik Hansen, Jan Svalland	Nominated
2013	British Academy Film Awards (BAFTA)	Best Film Not in the English Language		Nominated
2013	Empire Awards	Best Thriller		Won
2012	European Film Awards	People's Choice Award for Best European Film		Nominated
2012	Golden Trailer Awards	Best Foreign Action Trailer		Nominated
2011	Philadelphia Film Festival	Audience Award - Honorable Mention		Won
2012	Phoenix Film Critics Society Award	Best Foreign Language Film		Nominated
2012	San Diego Film Critics Society Awards	Best Foreign Language Film		Nominated
2013	Saturn Awards	Best International Film		Won
2012	St. Louis Gateway Film Critics Association Awards	Best Foreign Language Film		Nominated

== See also ==
- Scandinavian noir
