= Černé vdovy =

- Genre: Crime comedy
- Starring: Jitka Čvančarová, Lucia Siposová, Jana Plodková
- Country of origin: Czech Republic
- Original language: Czech
- No. of seasons: 2
- No. of episodes: 16

Production
- Running time: 55 minutes

Original release
- Network: Prima televize
- Release: 2019

Related
- Mustat lesket

Černé vdovy (Black Widows) is a Czech television series that has been broadcast by Prima televize since 17 February 2019. Jana Plodková, Jitka Čvančarová and Lucia Siposová starred in the series. It is written by Radek Bajgar, Pavel Gotthard, Mirka Zlatníková, Michaela Sabo and Milan Tesař. Radek Bajgar is also the director. Černé vdovy is an adaptation of Finnish series Mustat lesket.

In March 2022, filming began for the second season consisting of 8 episodes.

== Cast ==
- Jana Plodková as Renata Jůzlová
- Jitka Čvančarová as Johana Rychnovská
- Lucia Siposová as Veronika Majerová
- Bolek Polívka as a criminalist Olin Nekula
- Filip Blažek as Mirek Jůzl, Renata's husband
- Pavla Beretová as Billy, bartender and Mirek's lover
- Jan Vondráček as Petr Písařík
- Martin Myšička as Erik, psychologist who is Renata's neighbor
- Jan Hájek as Josef Kašpar (Sagi)
- Dana Batulková as Aštanga, Renata's mother
- Jiří Maryško as Alex
- Marek Lambora as Filip Rychnovský
- Pavel Šimčík as Ing. Jonáš
- Claudie Černá as Líza Jůzlová
- Martin Stránský as Daniel Rychnovský
- Petr Vršek as Jan Majer
