= Povel Pedersson Paus =

Norwegian cleric

Sir Povel Pedersson Paus (Note: Although the family name Paus is attested in his lifetime, he often omitted it in everyday use in accordance with the custom of the time, and was often known by his given name and patronymic as Paul Peterson; the exact spelling of both names could vary, both in Latinized and Norwegian versions. His given name may be spelled Paulus, Povlus, Paul, Povel or Povl; his patronymic may be spelled e.g. Pedersen, Pederssen, Pedersøn, Pedersson or in Latinized form as Petri. In formal documents in his lifetime he was often known as Paul, Paulus, Povel or Povlus Petri Wind, Win or Windius, i.e. Paul Peterson of Vinje, his birthplace. In other documents he used the family name Paus (Paüs). As a member of the clergy, one of the two privileged estates, he was styled as herr in Norwegian or Dominus in Latin, conventionally rendered as Sir as an ecclesiastical title in English; the Norwegian style herr was (until the 19th century) reserved for members of the clergy and the nobility and may be translated as "Sir" or "Lord"; its predecessor sira (sir) had been introduced as the style for clergymen in Norway in the 13th century and gradually been replaced by the Norwegianized version herr from the 15th century. Locally in Hjartdal he was commonly known as Sir Pál (herr Pál; Pál was the local dialectal version of Paul).)
- Born: 1625; Vinje prestegjeld
- Died: 1682 (aged 56–57); Hjartdal prestegjeld
- Other name: Paulus Petri Wind(ius) [Paul Peterson of Vinje]
- Education: Oslo Cathedral School; University of Copenhagen
- Occupation: Cleric
- Children: Hans Paus; Cornelius Paus
- Father: Peter Paulson Paus

Sir Povel Pedersson Paus (1625 in Vinje – 1682 in Hjartdal), also rendered as Paul Paus and commonly known locally in Telemark as Sir Pál (Norwegian: herr Pál), was a Norwegian cleric and a signatory of the 1661 Sovereignty Act, the new constitution of Denmark-Norway, as one of the 87 representatives of the Norwegian clerical estate, one of the two privileged estates of the realm in Denmark-Norway. He is known as the author of the 1653 poem "In memoriam Domini Petri Pavli", a loving poem in Latin in memory of his father Peter Paulson Paus. Paul Paus was reputed to be a learned and contemplative personality. His descendants include the playwright Henrik Ibsen.

== Life and work ==
After attending Oslo Cathedral School and the University of Copenhagen, he served as parish priest of the district of Hjartdal prestegjeld from 1649 to 1682. Magnus Brostrup Landstad describes Paul Peterson Paus as a learned and pious priest, well versed in Latin, who unusually held on to Catholic customs in post-Reformation Norway even in the anti-Catholic and strictly Lutheran climate of his lifetime. He had a habit of walking around on the cemetery after sunset. "He went back and forth, up and down, deep in thought, or stood quietly with his head bowed and his hands folded over his chest. When one asked him why he did this, he replied that he was praying for all the departed souls that burned in purgatory. Since he was no longer allowed to celebrate requiem mass for them inside the church, he had to do it outside, and it could certainly be needed, he believed."

Paul Peterson Paus is noted for his 1653 poem "In memoriam Domini Petri Pavli," a loving poem in Latin in memory of his father Peter Paulson Paus, the provost of Upper Telemark. Paul Peterson Paus was the father of parish prist of Kviteseid and poet Hans Paus and of district judge of Upper Telemark Cornelius Paus, and was the 4th great-grandfather of playwright Henrik Ibsen. He used a seal, e.g. on the Sovereignty Act, with a reversed crane in its vigilance.

Paul Paus used a seal with a reversed crane in its vigilance

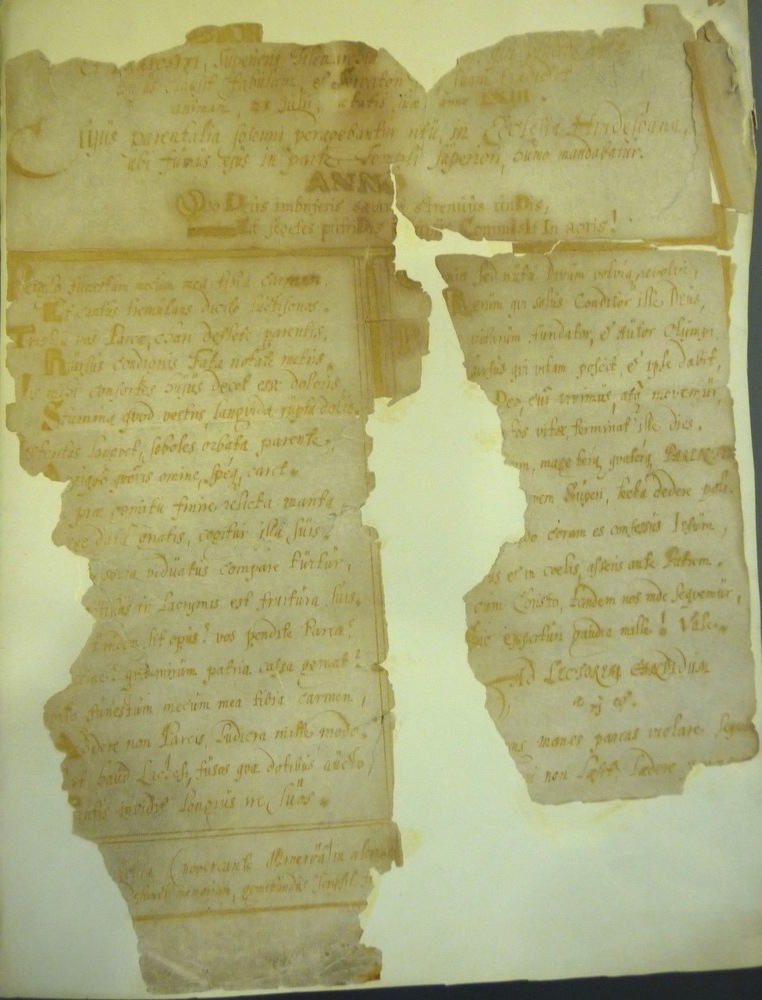
Poem in Latin written by Paul Paus in memory of his father Peter Paus in 1653
