= Ringeren =

Norwegian weekly political magazine (1898–1899)

- Editor: Sigurd Ibsen (1898); Carl Naerup (1899)
- Categories: Political magazine
- Frequency: Weekly
- Founder: Sigurd Ibsen
- Founded: 1897; 128 years ago
- First issue: 1 January 1898; 127 years ago
- Final issue: 1899; 126 years ago
- Country: Norway
- Based in: Kristiania
- Language: Norwegian

Ringeren was a Norwegian weekly political magazine which existed between 1898 and 1899. The magazine was founded by Sigurd Ibsen and was headquartered in Kristiania, Norway.

== History and profile ==
Ringeren was established as a weekly magazine by Sigurd Ibsen in Kristiania. A test issue appeared on 27 November 1897. Its first issue was published on 1 January 1898. The magazine covered articles about politics, culture, literature and criticism and was edited by Ibsen in 1898. Its contributors included Bjørnstjerne Bjørnson, Knut Hamsun, Fridtjof Nansen, Ernst Sars and Arne Garborg. Sigurd Ibsen published articles in Ringeren supporting the continuation of monarchy in Norway, but the termination of the Union with Sweden. J. Laurence Hare argues that Ibsen's writings had significant effects on the dynamics of the ongoing debate over the Union by proposing the monarchy as the solution to both the foreign and domestic obstacles to independence of Norway. Andreas Martin Hansen published articles on Norwegian popular psychology in 1899.

Carl Naerup took over the magazine shortly before it folded in 1899.
