= Brown Journal of World Affairs =

- Editors-in-chief: Michelle Alas Molina, Ariana Palomo
- Categories: International relations
- Publisher: Watson Institute for International and Public Affairs, Brown University
- Founded: 1993
- Country: United States
- Website: https://bjwa.brown.edu/
- ISSN: 1080-0786

The Brown Journal of World Affairs is a biannual magazine of international relations and foreign policy produced at Watson School of International and Public Affairs at Brown University. It was established in 1993 as the Brown Journal of Foreign Affairs by Daniel Cruise, Alex Scribner, and Michael Soussan. The magazine features essays written by world leaders, policymakers, and prominent academics. Each issue is composed of three thematic sections dedicated to exploring different topics in contemporary international politics and economics. In addition, each issue includes an open essay section, in which a wide variety of global issues are discussed.

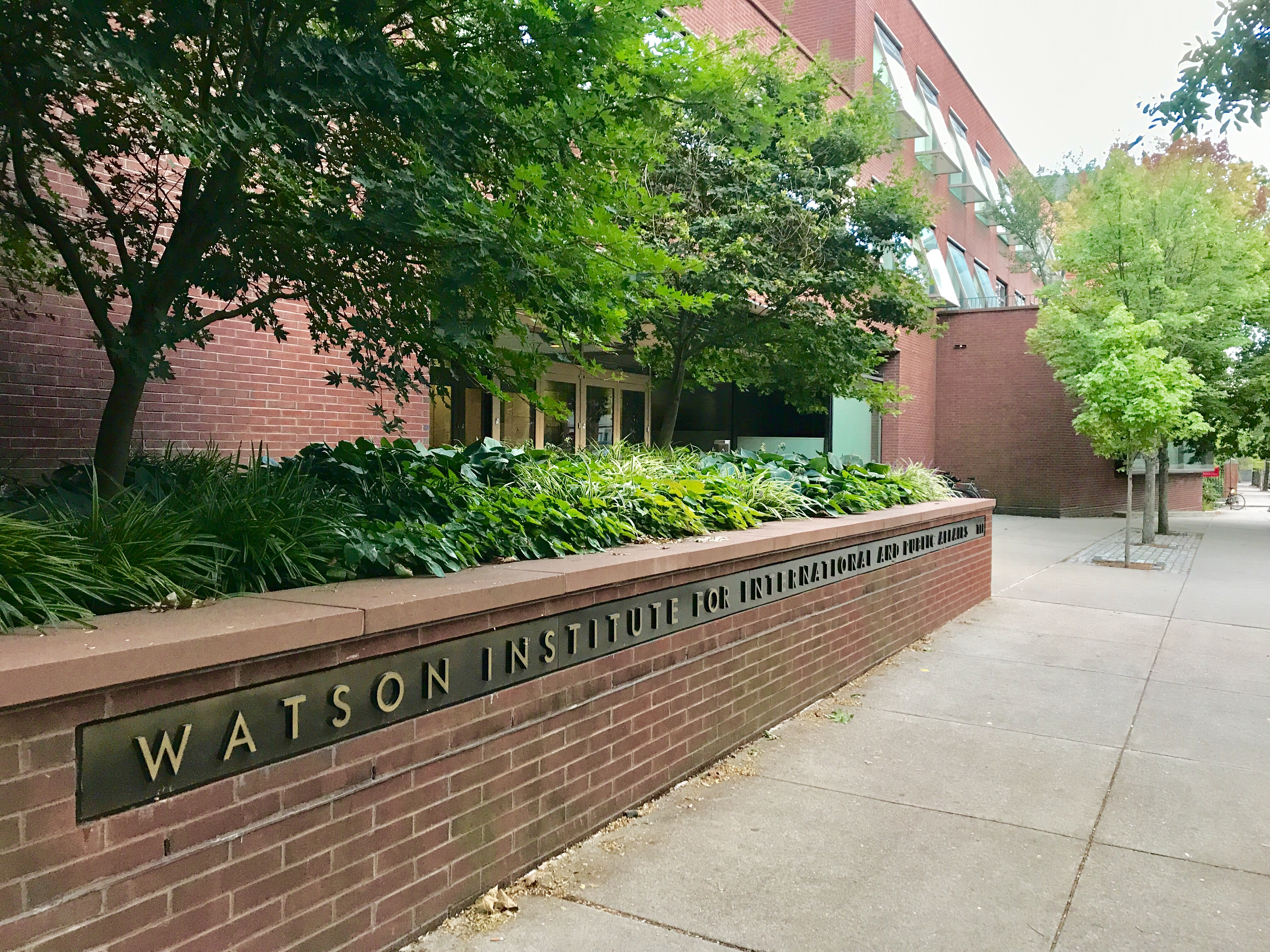
BJWA's editing headquarters, located in Brown's Watson Institute

The magazine is funded in part by the Watson Institute for International and Public Affairs and Brown's Finance Board.

== Editors-in-chief ==
The magazine is led by two editors-in-chief, who typically serve one year terms.

- Daniel Cruise 1994
- Alexander Scribner 1994
- Michael Soussan 1995
- Pier Smulders 1995
- Spyros Demetriou 1996
- J. Peter Scoblic 1997
- Andrew Lowenstein
- Michael J. Hsu 1997
- Tarek E. Masoud 1997
- Douglas McGray 1997
- Jeffrey W. Dillon 1999
- Shalinee Sharma 1999
- Elizabeth Foz 2000
- Madeleine Kokx 2000
- Charlene Lat 2001
- James Fichter 2001
- Patrick O'Brien 2002
- Jennifer Schwartzman 2002
- Jaideep Singh 2003
- Daniel Widome 2003
- Andrew Horesh 2004
- Keith Stanski 2004
- Jesse Finkelstein 2005
- Priya Bindra 2005
- Barron YoungSmith 2006
- Seema Vora 2006
- Jillian Moo-Young 2006
- Kenta Tsuda 2007
- Katherine Reisner 2007
- Craig Kennedy 2008
- Shiyin Wang 2008
- Solomon Eppel 2010
- Tushar Khadloya 2010
- Anagha Prasad 2010
- Harvey Stephenson 2011
- Anthony Badami 2011
- Melanie Garunay 2011
- Sam Magaram 2012
- Mustafa Safdar 2012
- Kathy Nguyen 2013
- Cameron Parsons 2013
- Reva Dhingra 2014
- Maxwell Ernst 2014
- Carol Kim 2015
- Sabin Ray 2015
- Katherine Pollock 2016
- Lily Halpern 2016
- Tomas Navia 2016
- Pranav Sharma 2017
- Asya Igmen 2017
- Paul Butler 2018
- Luiza Osorio G. da Silva 2018
- Oliver Hermann 2019
- Jacquelyn S. Ingrassia 2019
- Isabel Alexiades 2020
- Jonah Shrock 2020
- Rakhi Kundra 2021
- Olivia Siemens 2021
- Caroline Allen 2022
- Kamran King 2022
- Isabella Yepes 2023
- Erik Brown 2023
- Luka Willett 2024
- Marcie Madoff 2024
- Michelle Alas Molina 2025
- Ariana Palomo 2025
- Irene Zhao 2026
- Ashton Higgins 2026
