= Frikjent =

Norwegian crime drama television series

- Also known as: Acquitted
- Genre: Thriller; Crime drama
- Country of origin: Norway
- Original language: Norwegian
- No. of series: 2
- No. of episodes: 18

Production
- Camera setup: Multi-camera
- Running time: 45 minutes

Original release
- Network: TV2 (Norway)
- Release: 2 March 2015

Frikjent ("Acquitted") is a 2015 Norwegian TV series. In the UK, the series is shown on Walter Presents.

== Content ==
In season one, Aksel Nilsen (Nicolai Cleve Broch) was tried 20 years ago for the murder of 18-year-old ex-girlfriend Karine Hansteen. Although he was first convicted for the crime, he was acquitted later following a decisive witness testimony from his childhood friend, Tonje Sandvik (Synnøve Macody Lund). Branded, he disappears from his home town Lifjord in Norway and makes his career in Asia. He lives with his wife Angeline and his son as a successful businessman in Kuala Lumpur.

One day he receives a phone call from William Hansteen, father of Karine, who asks him for an investment in the financially troubled solar panel company in Lifjord. Aksel flies to Norway, where old feuds flare up and Eva Hansteen, mother of Karine and CEO of the company, fights him fiercely and convinces the police officer of the town to re-investigate the murder of Karine. This eventually leads to significant revelations regarding the night of the crime and the role of someone else in the murder.

In season two, after an outrageous confession, William Hansteen is brought to trial for the murder of Karine. Aksel hopes that the truth will come to light and that he will finally be washed clean of the old suspicion. Although he receives support from prosecutor Amina Sahir, he once again finds Eva Hansteen in his way, who uses every means to protect her husband from imprisonment. When another girl dies, the investigation again focuses on the Nilsen family and Aksel's brother Erik is arrested. Alone, Aksel now also has to free his brother from suspicion.

== Cast ==
- Nicolai Cleve Broch as Aksel (Nilsen) Borgen
- Lena Endre as Eva Hansteen
- Ingar Helge Gimle as William Hansteen
- Anne Marit Jacobsen as Mai-Britt Nilsen
- Tobias Santelmann as Erik Nilsen
- Synnøve Macody Lund as Tonje Sandvik
- Elaine Tan as Angeline Borgen
- Fridtjov Såheim as Svein Eriksen
- Henrik Rafaelsen as Lars Hansteen
- Ellen Dorrit Petersen as Inger Moen Hansteen
- Susanne Boucher as Helene Hansteen
- Mathias Romano as Tim Borgen
- Amrita Acharia as Amina Sahir
