= Black Widows (Indian TV series) =

Indian Web series

- Promotional Poster
- Genre: Crime; Thriller
- Based on: Mustat Lesket by Mikko Pöllä
- Written by: Radhika Anand
- Directed by: Birsa Dasgupta
- Starring: Mona Singh; Swastika Mukherjee; Shamita Shetty; Sharad Kelkar; Parambrata Chattopadhyay; Sabyasachi Chakraborty; Aamir Ali; Raima Sen; Mohan Kapoor
- Country of origin: India
- Original language: Hindi

Production
- Producer: Namit Sharma
- Cinematography: Subhankar Bhar
- Editor: Sumit Chowdhury
- Production company: Big Synergy Media Ltd.

Original release
- Network: ZEE5
- Release: 18 December 2020

Black Widows is a ZEE5 original dark comedy Indian web series directed by Birsa Dasgupta and produced by Namit Sharma. The series is a remake of the popular 2014 Finnish show, Mustat Lesket. Starring Mona Singh, Swastika Mukherjee, Shamita Shetty, Sharad Kelkar, Mohan Kapur, Parambrata Chattopadhyay, Vipul Roy, Sabyasachi Chakraborty, Aamir Ali and Raima Sen, the series released through ZEE5 on 18 December 2020.

== Plot ==
The premise revolves around Veera, Jayati and Kavita who plan to get rid of their husbands to end the misery in their wed-locked lives.

== Cast ==
- Mona Singh as Veera Mehrotra
- Swastika Mukherjee as Jayati Sardesai
- Shamita Shetty as Kavita Tharoor
- Sharad Kelkar as Jatin Mehrotra
- Parambrata Chattopadhyay as Inspector Pankaj Mishra
- Sabyasachi Chakraborty as Barry Singh Dhillon
- Mohan Kapur as Lalit
- Aamir Ali as Eddie
- Raima Sen as Innaya Thakur
- Saheb Chatterjee as Rameez Sheikh
- Nikhil Bhambri as Jahaan Sardesai
- Mithu Chakraborty as Rameez's mother
- Mainak Banerjee as a Constable
- Rupsha Chatterjee as Jatin's Secretary

== Release ==
Black Widows premiered through ZEE5 on 18 December 2020.

== Reception ==
Archika Khurana from Times of India stated "Swastika Mukherjee steals the show as the strong-headed yet emotionally smothered Jayati and overall praised the plot of the series." Hindustan Times wrote "An enthralling murder mystery with a dash of dark humour" at the same time praised the performances of the entire cast. News 18 summed their review as "Too Much Hamming Ruins This Otherwise Average Mystery". Scroll.in summed their review stating that the cast gave a balanced performance, at the same time dissected each characters.

== Accolades ==
| Awards | Date of ceremony | Categories | Recipients | Results | Ref. |
|---|---|---|---|---|---|
| Asian Television Awards | 2021 | Best Original Digital Drama Series | | Nominated | |
| Indian Television Academy Awards | 2022 | Best Screenplay | Radhika Anand | Won | |
| IWM Buzz Digital Awards | 2022 | Best Editing in a Web Series | | Won | |
