= Backstabbing for Beginners =

2018 film by Per Fly

- Theatrical release poster
- Directed by: Per Fly
- Written by: Daniel Pyne; Per Fly
- Based on: Backstabbing for Beginners: My Crash Course in International Diplomacy by Michael Soussan
- Produced by: Lars Knudsen; Nikolaj Vibe Michelsen; Jay Van Hoy; Malene Blenkov
- Starring: Theo James; Ben Kingsley; Belçim Bilgin; Jacqueline Bisset
- Cinematography: Brendan Steacy
- Edited by: Morten Giese
- Music by: Todor Kobakov
- Production companies: Creative Alliance; Eyeworks Scandi Fiction; Hoylake Capital; Parts and Labor; Scythia Films; Waterstone Entertainment
- Distributed by: A24; DirecTV Cinema
- Release dates: 18 January 2018 (Denmark); 27 April 2018 (United States)
- Running time: 104 minutes
- Countries: Canada; Denmark; United States
- Language: English
- Budget: $8 million
- Box office: $367,000

Backstabbing for Beginners is a 2018 political thriller film directed and co-written by Per Fly, and based on the memoirs of Michael Soussan. It follows the real life corruption scandal in the UN Oil-for-Food Programme, and stars Theo James and Ben Kingsley.

== Plot ==
The film follows Michael Sullivan, the son of a US State Department diplomat who died when Michael was young. Michael leaves a lucrative job at a large bank and lands his dream job as a diplomat with the United Nations (UN) in the fall of 2002. He is assigned to work as an assistant to Under-Secretary-General Costa "Pasha" Pasaris, the head of the Oil-for-Food Programme, operated since 1995 to help the citizens of Iraq without allowing the oil sales to boost Saddam Hussein and his regime. On his first visit to Baghdad, local UN chief diplomat Christina Dupre makes it clear to Pasha that she is disturbed by the corruption in the programme, and plans to publish a report voicing her concerns. This is the first Michael hears of the problem, and over the course of the film he uncovers a major corruption scandal, whereby payoffs and bribes diverted $20 billion of the funds away from food and into the hands of companies, banks, officials of various governments, and officials of the UN itself, possibly including Pasha, so that Hussein can pocket over $1 billion of the funds.

Michael falls in love with Nashim, a UN worker in Baghdad who reveals aspects of the corruption to Michael, while she covertly works to advance the cause of her own people, the Kurds of northern Iraq. Pasha tries to teach Michael about the realities of diplomacy in a world filled with corruption, highlighting that $60 billion does make it into buying food and medicine for the people of Iraq. As more of the people around him are killed, including Nashim and Dupre, and as the corruption continues even after the programme was de jure terminated in 2003, following the Coalition Invasion of Iraq, a dejected Michael gathers evidence and takes it to The Wall Street Journal.

== Cast ==
- Theo James as Michael
- Ben Kingsley as Costa Pasaris, a.k.a. Pasha (fashioned after Benon Sevan, head of the United Nations' Oil-for-Food Programme)
- Belçim Bilgin as Nashim
- Jacqueline Bisset as Dupre
- Rossif Sutherland as Trevor
- Rachel Wilson as Lily
- Brian Markinson as Rasnetsov
- Aidan Devine as Cutter
- Daniela Lavender as Ruth Zekar Kal
- Peshang Rad as Hassan
- Kardo Razazi as Abhek

== Production ==
The film was a Canada, United States and Denmark co-production. Josh Hutcherson was originally set to star in the movie but dropped out and was replaced by Theo James. Filming started in March 2016 in Marrakesh, Morocco, with other scenes shot in Copenhagen in April 2016. The production budget was $8 million.

== Release ==
In June 2017, A24 and DirecTV Cinema acquired U.S. distribution rights to the film. The film was released in Denmark on 18 January 2018. The film was released through DirecTV Cinema on 22 March 2018, before receiving a limited release in the United States on 27 April 2018.

== Reception ==
On Rotten Tomatoes, Backstabbing for Beginners got a 41% approval from 22 reviews, and an average rating of 4.7/10. Review aggregator Metacritic gave the film 48 out of 100, based on 8 critics, indicating "mixed or average" reviews.

Frank Scheck called the film "an inert would-be thriller". Jessica Kiang of Variety Magazine criticized the "romantic subplot, complete with heavy-breathing sex scene, and some of the more cloak-and-dagger-y intrigue show", which she saw as "Hollywood-izing a complicated and tragic real-world situation". Michael Rechtshaffen of the Los Angeles Times said that "despite delivering few actual thrills, the fact-based Backstabbing for Beginners qualifies as an intelligent, well-crafted political thriller".
