= Jørgen Haave =

Norwegian literary scholar (born 1971)

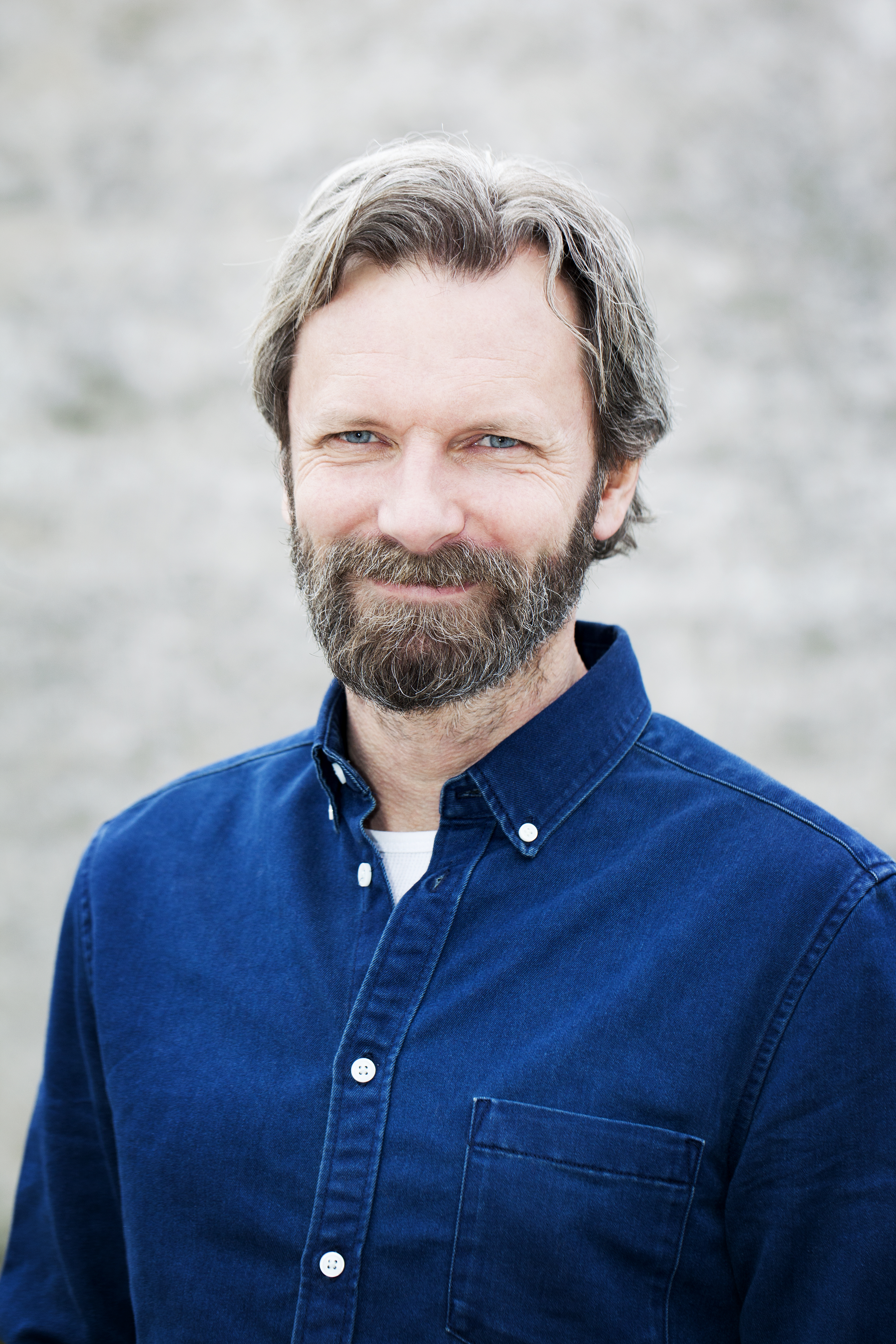
- Born: 1971 (age 54–55); Bergen, Norway
- Occupations: Literary scholar, senior curator and director of the Henrik Ibsen Museum

Jørgen Haave (born 1971) is a Norwegian literary scholar and the senior curator and director of the Henrik Ibsen Museum in Skien, a part of Telemark Museum. He is especially known for his Ibsen biography, The Ibsen Family (Familien Ibsen) (2017), and is one of the foremost contemporary Ibsen scholars; alongside Jon Nygaard he has been central in a scholarly reassessment of older myths pertaining to Ibsen's background and childhood, and their influence upon his work.

Haave published a biography of Peter Wessel Zapffe in 1999 and graduated in history of literature in 2003 with a thesis on Ibsen's Ghosts. He was appointed as director of Henrik Ibsen Museum in 2008. He was awarded the second prize of the Hjernekraft prize of the Norwegian Association of Researchers in 2017 for his work on Ibsen. In 2019 he became a senior curator.

== Selected works ==
- Kulturelt nødverge: Zapffes etterlatte skrifter, Pax forlag, 1997
- Naken under kosmos, Pax forlag, 1999
- Familien Ibsen, Museumsforlaget, 2017
