= The Inheritance (2003 film) =

Arven
- Directed by: Per Fly
- Written by: Kim Leona; Per Fly; Mogens Rukov
- Produced by: Ib Tardini
- Starring: Ulrich Thomsen; Lisa Werlinder
- Cinematography: Harald Gunnar Paalgard
- Music by: Halfdan E
- Release date: 21 February 2003
- Country: Denmark
- Language: Danish

The Inheritance (Danish: Arven) is a 2003 Danish film directed by Per Fly. It is released as Inheritance in the United Kingdom.

The screenplay was written by Kim Leona, Per Fly and Mogens Rukov produced by Ib Tardini, and starred Ulrich Thomsen and Lisa Werlinder.

== Plot ==
Christoffer (Ulrich Thomsen) is called back from his life as a restaurant manager in Sweden when his father commits suicide. His mother, Annelise (Ghita Nørby) puts pressure on him to take over management of the family business, a steelworks factory.

Although his heart is not in it, he feels obligated to take up the task. The decision is met with frustration and anger from his wife Maria (Lisa Werlinder), who eventually accepts his decision and moves back to Denmark along with him.

The management task is slowly taking over Christoffer's time and life, and as a consequence, he ignores the needs of himself and his wife. As the managerial dilemmas include some of his personal relations, he is forced to give up his personal morals in order to meet the company needs.

Slowly, but surely, his altered life style pushes him away from Maria, who moves back to pursue her career as an actress in Sweden, which pushes him further towards a nervous breakdown.

The movie ends with the acceptance of his fate, indicating that he is following closely in the footsteps of his father, which led to the suicide in the beginning.

== Cast ==
- Ulrich Thomsen as Christoffer
- Lisa Werlinder as Maria
- Ghita Nørby as Annelise
- Karina Skands as Benedikte
- Lars Brygmann as Ulrik
- Peter Steen as Niels
- Diana Axelsen as Annika
- Jesper Christensen as Holger Andersen
- Ulf Pilgaard as Aksel
- Dick Kaysø as Jens Mønsted
- Sarah Juel Werner as Marie-Louise

== Critical reception ==
Upon release, the film received positive reviews. On Rotten Tomatoes it has an approval rating of 75% based on reviews from 36 critics. On Metacritic, it has a score of 68% based on 20 reviews.
