= Mustat lesket =

2014 Finnish TV series

Mustat lesket is a 2014 Finnish drama television series created by Mikko Pöllä, directed by Veikko Aaltonen and starring Pihla Viitala as Veera Joentie, Wanda Dubiel as Johanna Koskinen and Malla Malmivaara as Kirsi Lundberg.

== In other languages ==
It has been remade in various languages:

- remade as Black Widows in Danish, Norwegian and Swedish languages in 2016.
- remade as Mujeres de negro by Mexican Las Estrellas in 2016.
- remade as Černé vdovy by Czech Prima televize.
- remade as Black Widows in Hindi language in 2020.

== Awards ==
- In 2016, Mustat lesket won the Finnish audiovisual export Hulda award, granted by the Finnish Film & Audiovisual Export organization (Favex).
