= Black Widows (2016 TV series) =

Nordic television series

- Genre: Drama
- Created by: Mikko Pöllä
- Based on: Mustat lesket
- Directed by: Venita Ozols-Graham
- Starring: Cecilia Forss; Beate Bille; Synnøve Macody Lund
- Original languages: Danish; Norwegian; Swedish
- No. of seasons: 2

Production
- Production location: Finland
- Production company: Moskito Television

Original release
- Release: 2016 – 2017

Black Widows is a Nordic drama television series. It is created by Mikko Pöllä, directed by Venita Ozols-Graham and stars Cecilia Forss as Rebeka Axelsson, Beate Bille as Kira Just Bergman and Synnøve Macody Lund as Johanne Rønningen. It aired for two seasons from 2016 to 2017. Black Widows is a remake of the 2014 Finnish TV series Mustat lesket.

The series follows three best friends who are all in abusive marriages and whose husbands work at the same company. The women go through a life-changing event after their husbands die in an explosion during a boating trip.

Produced by the Finnish company Moskito Television, Black Widows is a Nordic collaboration: the production team is mainly Finnish, while the cast and the directors are Scandinavian, and the dialogue is in Danish, Norwegian and Swedish. Although shot almost entirely in Finland, the series is set in Scandinavia.
