= The Bench (film) =

2000 Danish drama film

- Directed by: Per Fly
- Starring: Jesper Christensen; Marius Sonne Janischefska; Stine Holm Joensen
- Production company: Zentropa Entertainments
- Distributed by: United International Pictures
- Release date: 27 October 2000
- Running time: 93 min
- Country: Denmark
- Language: Danish

The Bench (Danish: Bænken) is a 2000 Danish drama film directed by Per Fly.

== Synopsis ==
An unemployed drunk hangs out at a public bench in the town centre with a group of like-minded souls, with no interests other than finding the money for the next drink. When a single mother moves into a neighbouring apartment he becomes involved in her troubles.

== Cast ==
- Jesper Christensen – Kaj
- Marius Sonne Janischefska – Jonas
- Stine Holm Joensen – Liv
- Nicolaj Kopernikus – Stig
- Jens Albinus – Kim
- Sarah Boberg – Connie
- Benjamin Boe Rasmussen – Bo
- Holger Perfort – Pensionist

== Awards ==
- Bodil Award for Best Danish Film (2000)
- Robert Award for Best Danish Film (2000)
