= Borgestad Manor =

Estate in Norway

Coordinates: 59.164°N 9.651°E

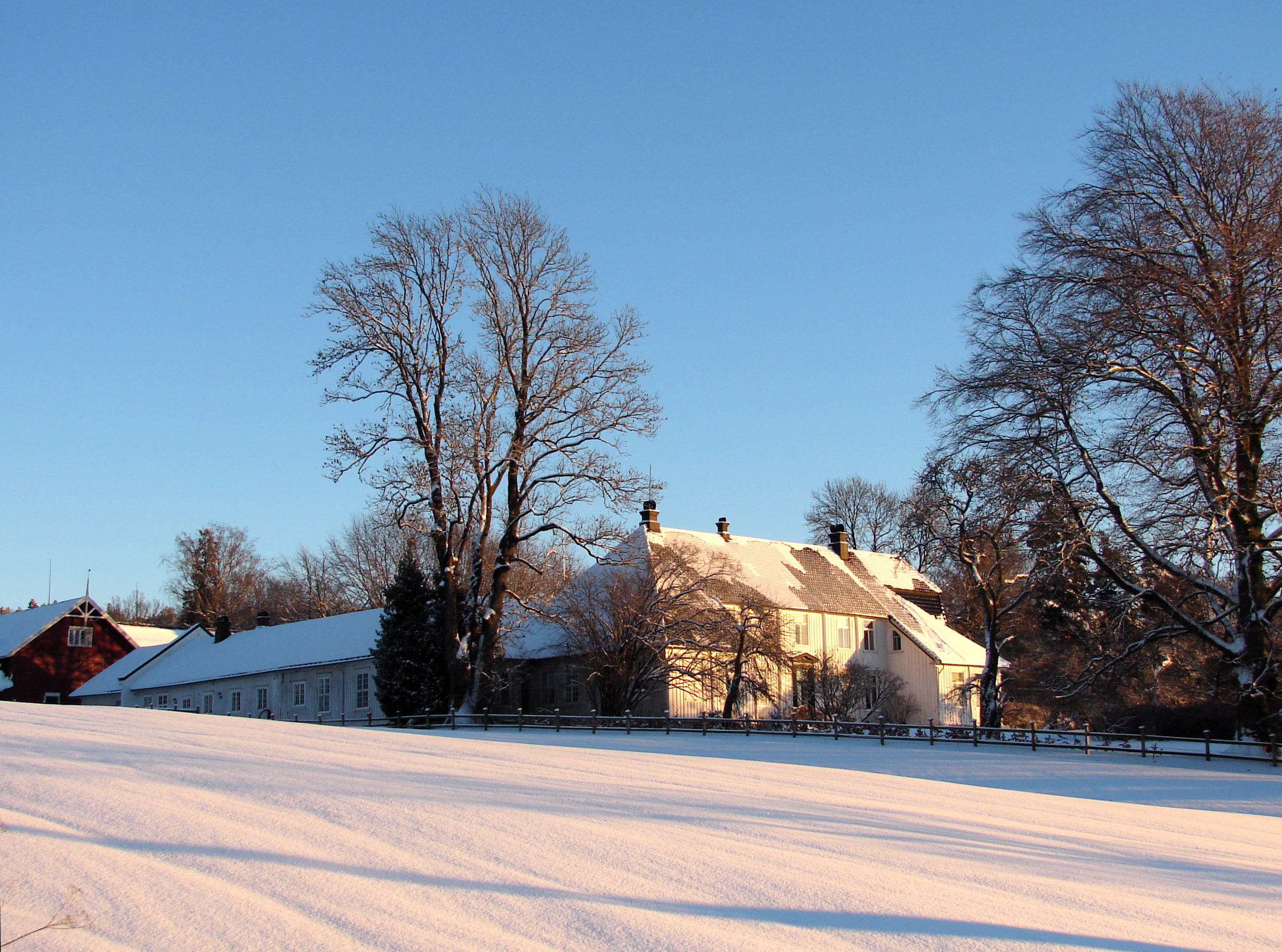
Borgestad Manor

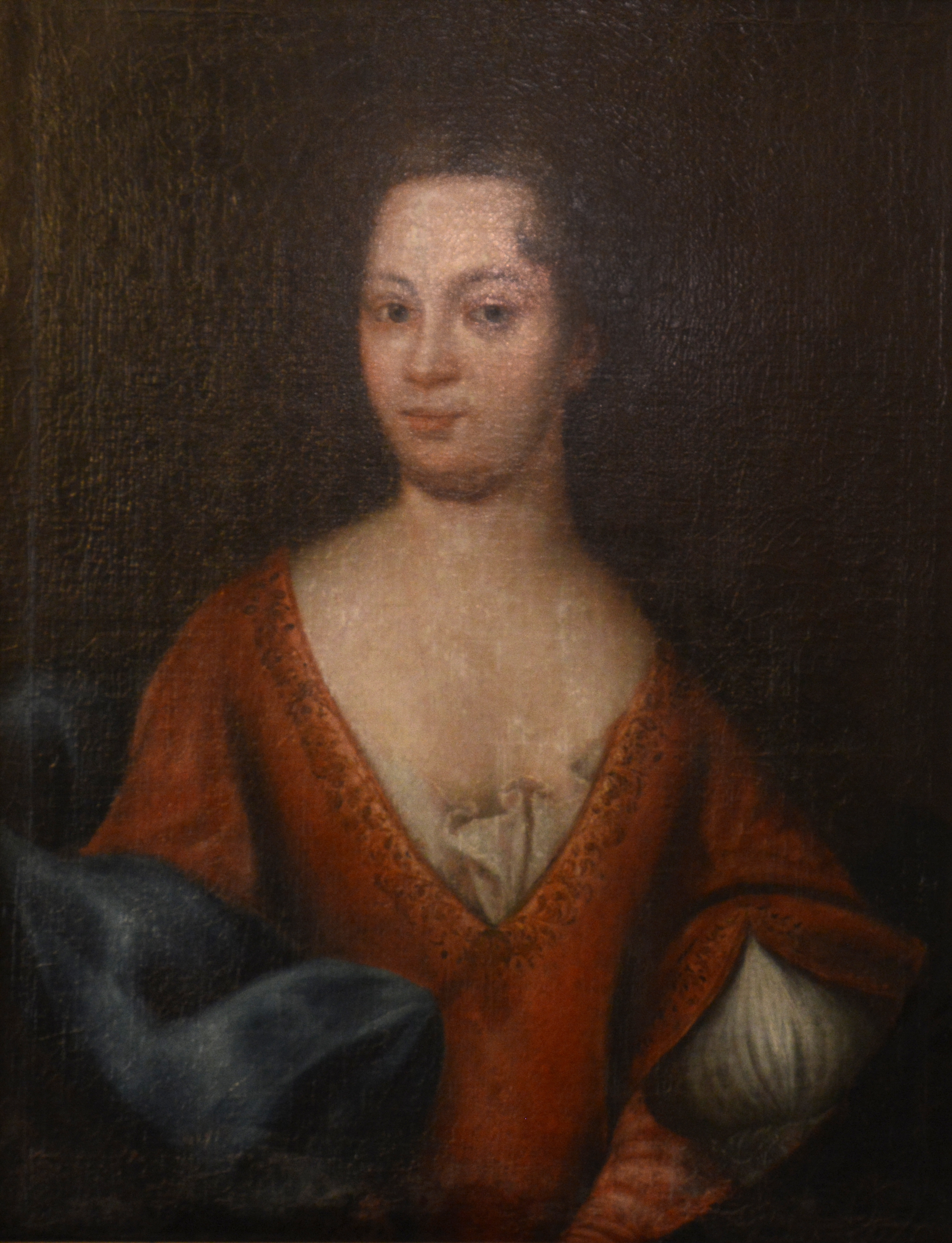
Anne Clausdatter (1659–1713), known from the poem Stolt Anne.

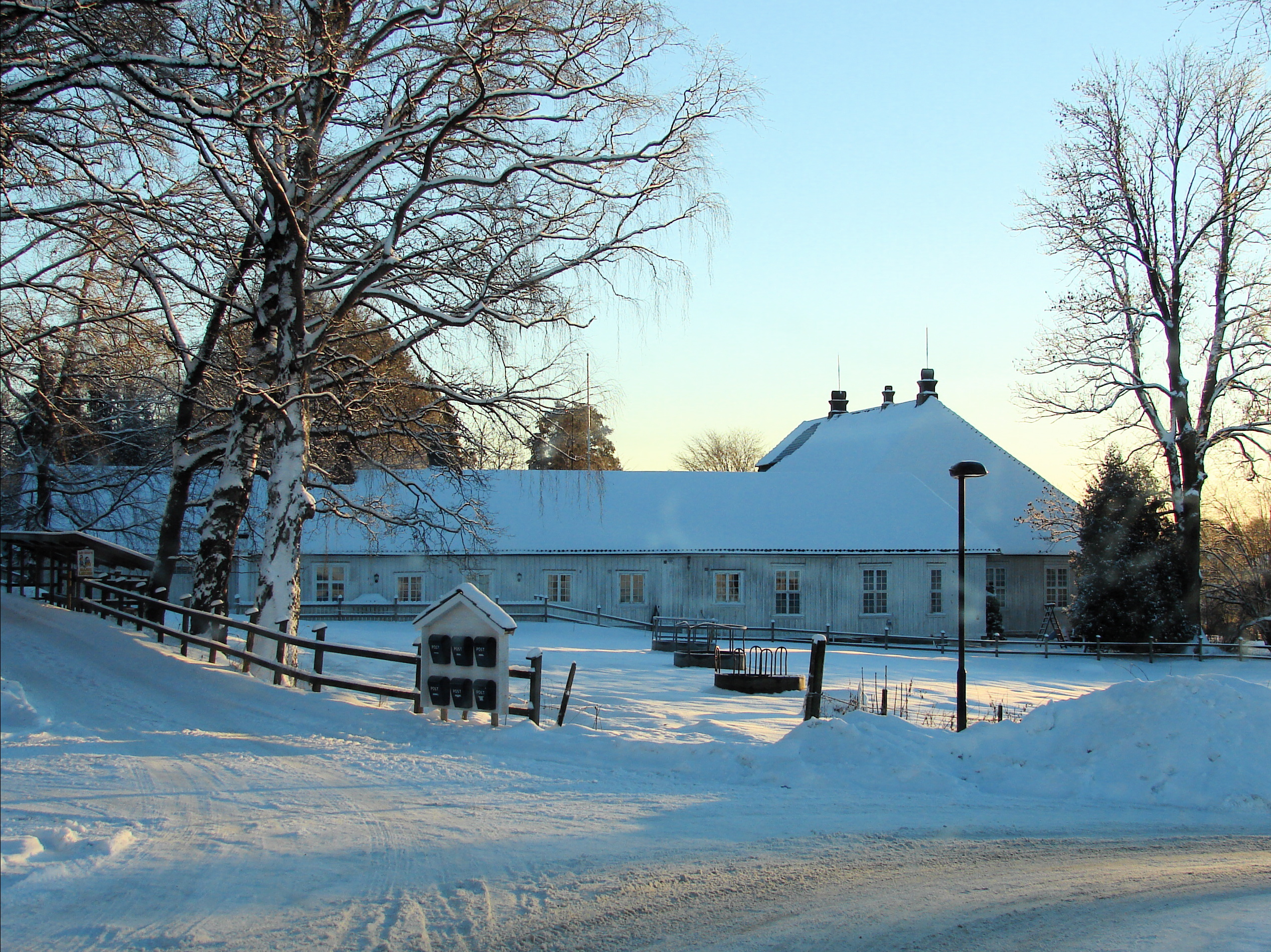
Borgestad Manor

Borgestad Manor (Norwegian: Borgestad gård) is an estate and manor house in Skien Municipality in Telemark county, Norway.

== History ==
Borgestad is located in the old Gjerpen Municipality between the towns of Skien (to the north) and Porsgrunn (to the south). It is one of the largest estates in the region. The farm was originally a church estate and was confiscated as a crown estate after the Reformation. The estate was acquired in 1700 by Anna Clausdatter (1659-1713) and her husband Major General Johan Hanssøn Arnold (1638––1709). Anna Clausdatter was the daughter of estate owner Claus Andersen (1624–1681). Johan Arnold had been commander of the regiment at Akershus. The manor house was built in approx. 1702. The Baroque garden was laid out at that same time.

Other notable owners have included merchant and shipowner Diderik von Cappelen (1761–1828) and former Prime Minister Gunnar Knudsen (1848–1928).

== Owners ==
- 1638–ca. 1650 Christen Andersen and his widow Anne Gundersdatter
- ca 1650–1691 Gjert Clausen (Niemand) and his widow Anne Gundersdatter (formerly married to Christen Andersen)
- 1692–1695 Halvor and Søren Borse (son in law and grandchild of Anne Gundersdatter)
- ca 1695–1713 Anne Clausdatter (grandchild of Anne Gundersdatter)
- 1719–1731 Hans Holmboe (married to a relative of Anne Clausdatter)
- 1731–1760 Herman Leopoldus (Løvenskiold from 1739) (son of Søren Borse's sister)
- 1760–1787 Bartholomæus Herman Løvenskiold (son of the former owner)
- 1787–1822 Jacob Aall (son in law of the former owner)
- 1822–1823 Didrich von Cappelen (stepson of the former owner)
- 1823–1853 Realf von Cappelen (brother of the former owner)
- 1853–1881 Erik Johan Cappelen (son of the former owner)
- 1881–1928 Sofie Knudsen née Cappelen (daughter of the former owner) and her husband Gunnar Knudsen
- 1928–1953 Erik Cappelen Knudsen (son of the former owners)
- 1953–1975 Gunnar Knudsen Borgestad (son of the former owner)
- 1975–2003 Erik Robert Knudsen Borgestad (son of the former owner)
- 2003 Stiftelsen Borgestad Gård (The Foundation Borgestad Manor) with Petter Borgestad (son of the former owner) as chairman

== Other sources ==
- Christensen, Terje (1985) Gjerpen bygds historie. Bind III Gårdshistorie (Skien: Gjerpen kommune) pp. 189–194
- Rian, Øystein (1997) Bratsberg på 1600-tallet Stat og samfunn i symbiose og konflikt (Universitetsforl) ISBN 9788200225195
