= Sigurd Ibsen =

Norwegian writer, lawyer and statesman

Sigurd Ibsen OB
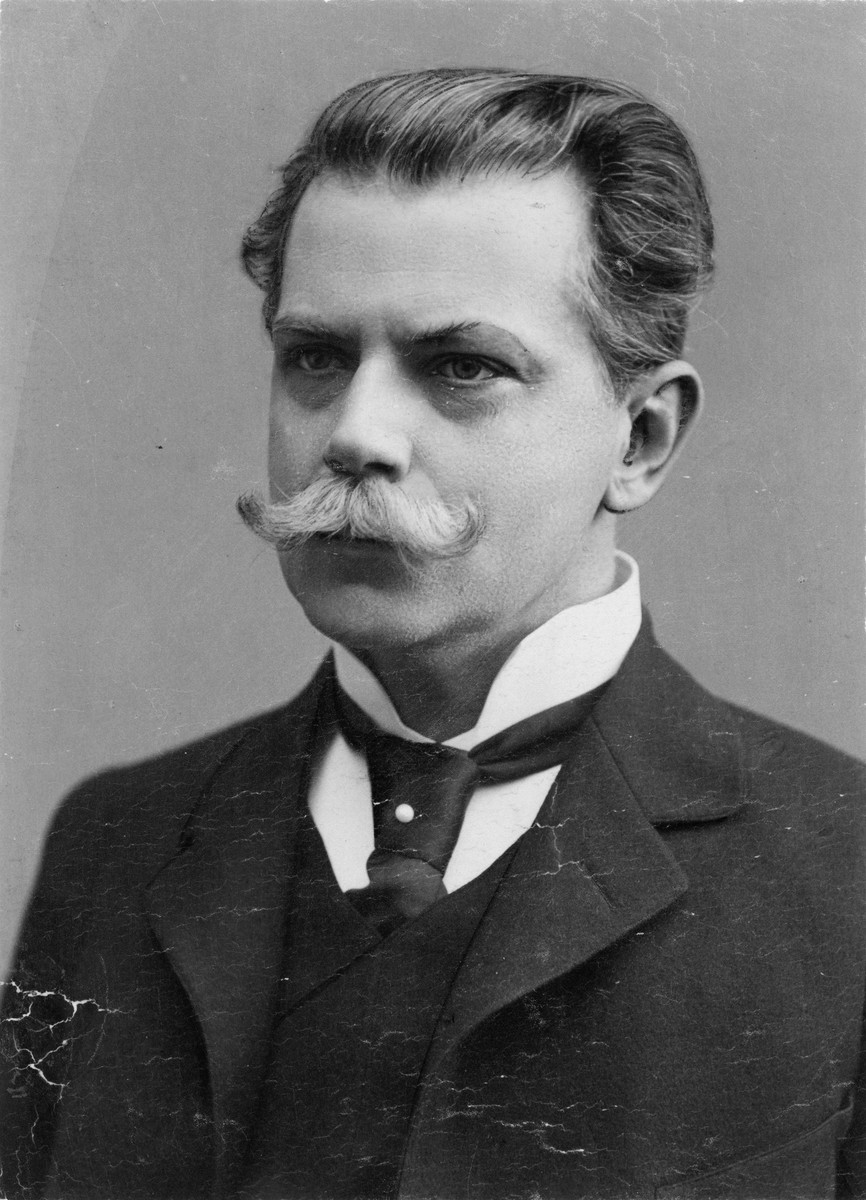

Prime Minister of Norway in Stockholm
- In office 22 October 1903 – 11 March 1905
- Monarch: Oscar II
- Prime Minister: Francis Hagerup
- Preceded by: Ole Anton Qvam
- Succeeded by: Jørgen Løvland

Personal details
- Born: 23 December 1859 Christiania, Sweden-Norway
- Died: 14 April 1930 (aged 70) Freiburg im Breisgau, Germany
- Party: Liberal
- Spouse: Bergliot Bjørnson (m. 1892)
- Children: Tancred Ibsen; Irene Ibsen Bille; Eleonora Borberg
- Parent(s): Suzannah Thoresen (mother); Henrik Ibsen (father)
- Relatives: Joen Bille (grandson)

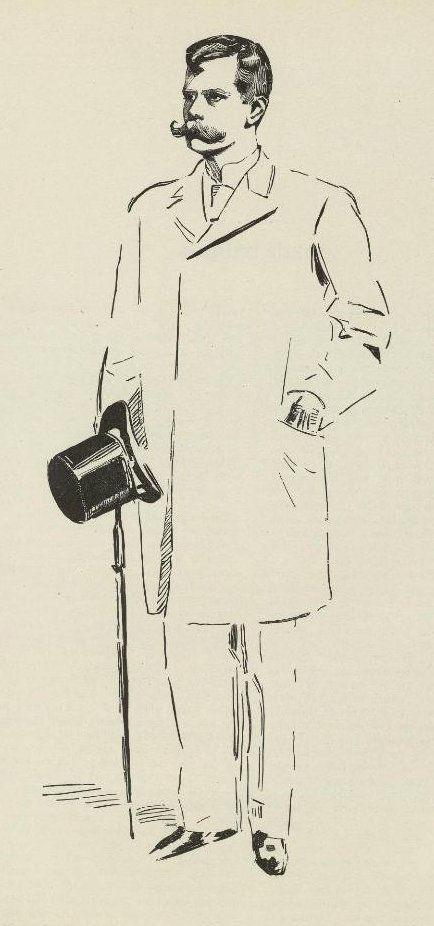
Drawing of Sigurd Ibsen

Sigurd Ibsen (23 December 1859 – 14 April 1930) was a Norwegian writer, lawyer and statesman, who served as the prime minister of Norway in Stockholm (1903–1905) and played a central role in the dissolution of the union between Norway and Sweden in 1905.

== Early life ==
Ibsen was born in Christiania (now called Oslo), but grew up mostly in Germany and Italy. Being the only child of playwright Henrik Ibsen and his wife Suzannah Thoresen, he struggled all his life to meet his family's high expectations.

Ibsen developed 'remarkably early', being able to read at the age of four and was fluent in Norwegian, German and Italian. Growing up however, Ibsen struggled to find friends who were Norwegian and his age, further complicated by the fact that his family was often deep in penury, and thus he appeared throughout his life to be impersonal to others who did not know him. He excelled in academics however, aiming to please both his parents and himself, and subsequently came top in his class for every subject including mathematics, which appears to have been a weak point of his.

== Adulthood ==
After passing his matriculation exams, Ibsen received a doctorate in law at the Sapienza University of Rome in 1882. He founded a magazine, Ringeren, in which he published articles about the changing roles of monarchy and republicanism.

Later, he was appointed to the position of Prime Minister of Stockholm and Norway at his father's behest so that he would remain a Norwegian citizen.

== Prime Minister in Stockholm ==
From 1903 to 1905, Sigurd Ibsen served as Prime Minister of Norway in Stockholm (i.e., the leader of the Norwegian delegation to the King of Sweden and Norway and the second highest cabinet position). During his term, George Francis Hagerup was Prime Minister in Christiania. Sigurd Ibsen played a central role in the dissolution of the union between Norway and Sweden in 1905, being credited with having introduced the idea. He is also regarded as important in convincing influential Norwegians supporting a republican government, like Bjørnstjerne Bjørnson, Arne Garborg and Fridtjof Nansen, to turn and instead support a monarchy. To his colleagues, Ibsen was an outspoken Norwegian patriot who was to be avoided, though his ideas succeeded in the end.

== Marriage and children ==
Some time in the late 19th century, Ibsen travelled to Aulestad to personally thank his father's old friend: author Bjørnstjerne Bjørnson for his political support, and he thus met Bjornson's family for the first time. Bjornson's daughter Bergliot remarks that she and her siblings were very excited to see Ibsen for he had been 'written and talked about so much'. Though she writes that she personally 'did not altogether like him' at first since he appeared to be 'too serious' and was 'mostly talking to Father', although she reveals that one day she was on the lower veranda of the house when Ibsen was on the upper one. Suddenly he looked down and smiled at her with 'his beautiful eyes', and it appears to be this moment at which Bergliot fell in love with him as she describes, though Ibsen himself does not mention the event himself in any surviving letters or works by him.

His father, Henrik Ibsen did not initially approve of their engagement as he felt he should have known first (even going so far as to publicly deny his son's engagement and subsequently angering both his son and Bjornson), though he finally accepted it and Sigurd and Bergliot married on 11 October 1892.

The Ibsens had three children. Their son, Tancred Ibsen, became a well-known film director and their daughter, Irene Ibsen Bille, was married to Josias Bille, a member of the Danish ancient noble Bille family. Irene and Josias's sons and Sigurd and Bergliot's grandsons were Danish manager Anders Steensen Bille and Danish actor Joen Bille. Sigurd and Bergliot also had another daughter: Eleonora, who married Danish author Svend Borberg and had three children.

== Death ==
Towards the end of his life, Sigurd Ibsen was said to be constantly in a low state of mind (a trait which seems to have been passed on to his daughter Eleonora), and lived 'in his own world', though he was at times lively and even slightly flirtatious as he had always been. None of his family noticed that he was seriously ill from what was actually cancer as he still had very good movement although, his wife mentions that he had to suddenly speak in a hoarse whisper. After a medical operation that was made on his throat, his final days were mostly spent unconscious, he died on 14 April 1930.

Sigurd Ibsen is buried in the Cemetery of Our Saviour, in Oslo, Norway.

== Literature ==
- Langslet, Lars Roar. Sønnen. Cappelen, 2004 ISBN 82-02-22101-3
- Steine, Bjørn Arne. Sigurd Ibsen : nasjon, politikk og kultur. Voksenåsen AS, 2005 ISBN 82-90617-34-8
- Rudeng, Erik (1994) “En statsmann i reserve”, Nytt norsk tidsskrift 11 (3-4): 266–280.
- Ibsen, Sigurd. Bak en gyllen fasade, Sigurd Ibsens brev til familien 1883-1929. Aschehoug, 1997. (Thorleif Dahls Kulturbibliotek) ISBN 82-03-26141-8
- Ibsen, Sigurd. Videnskab og mystik og andre essays. Grøndahl Dreyer, 1992. ISBN 82-504-1920-0
- Ibsen, Sigurd. Unionen. 1887
- Nabo.nb.no
- Ibsen, Bergliot. The Three Ibsens, Memories of Henrik Ibsen, Suzannah Ibsen and Sigurd Ibsen. New York, American-Scandinavian Foundation, 1952. [ISBN unspecified]
