= Bille (noble family) =

Danish noble family

- Nobility
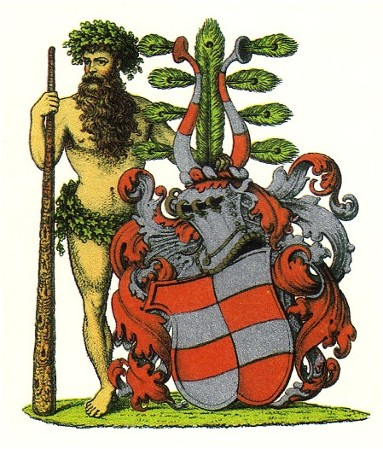
- Coat of arms, drawn 1890 by Anders Thiset
- Country: Denmark; Norway
- Founded: 1200s
- Titles: Count
- Dissolution: 1984 (Norway)
- Cadet branches: Bille-Brahe; Bille-Brahe-Selby

The Bille family (also spelled Bilde) is a Danish noble family. Its members have played a prominent role in Danish politics and society since the mid 13th century and also in Norway during the time Denmark was in a political union with Norway. The family includes the comital branches Bille-Brahe and Bille-Brahe-Selby. There was also a Norwegian branch of the family that died out in 1984.

== Notable members ==
- Steen Basse Torbensen Bille of Søholm (1446–1520)
- Eske Bille (d. 1552)
- Ove Bille (d. 1555)
- Claus Bille (1498–1558)
- Beate Clausdatter Bille (1526–1605)
- Tycho Brahe (1546–1601)
- Anders Bille (1600–1657)
- Michael Bille (1680–1756)
- Daniel Ernst Bille (1711–1790)
- Steen Andersen Bille (1751–1833)
- Michael Johannes Petronius Bille (1769–1845)
- Steen Andersen Bille (1797–1883)
- Ida Marie Bille (1822–1902)
- Louise Bille-Brahe (1830–1910)
- Ejler Bille (1910–2004)
- Joen Bille (b. 1944)
- Beate Bille (b. 1976)
