= Per Fly =

Danish film director

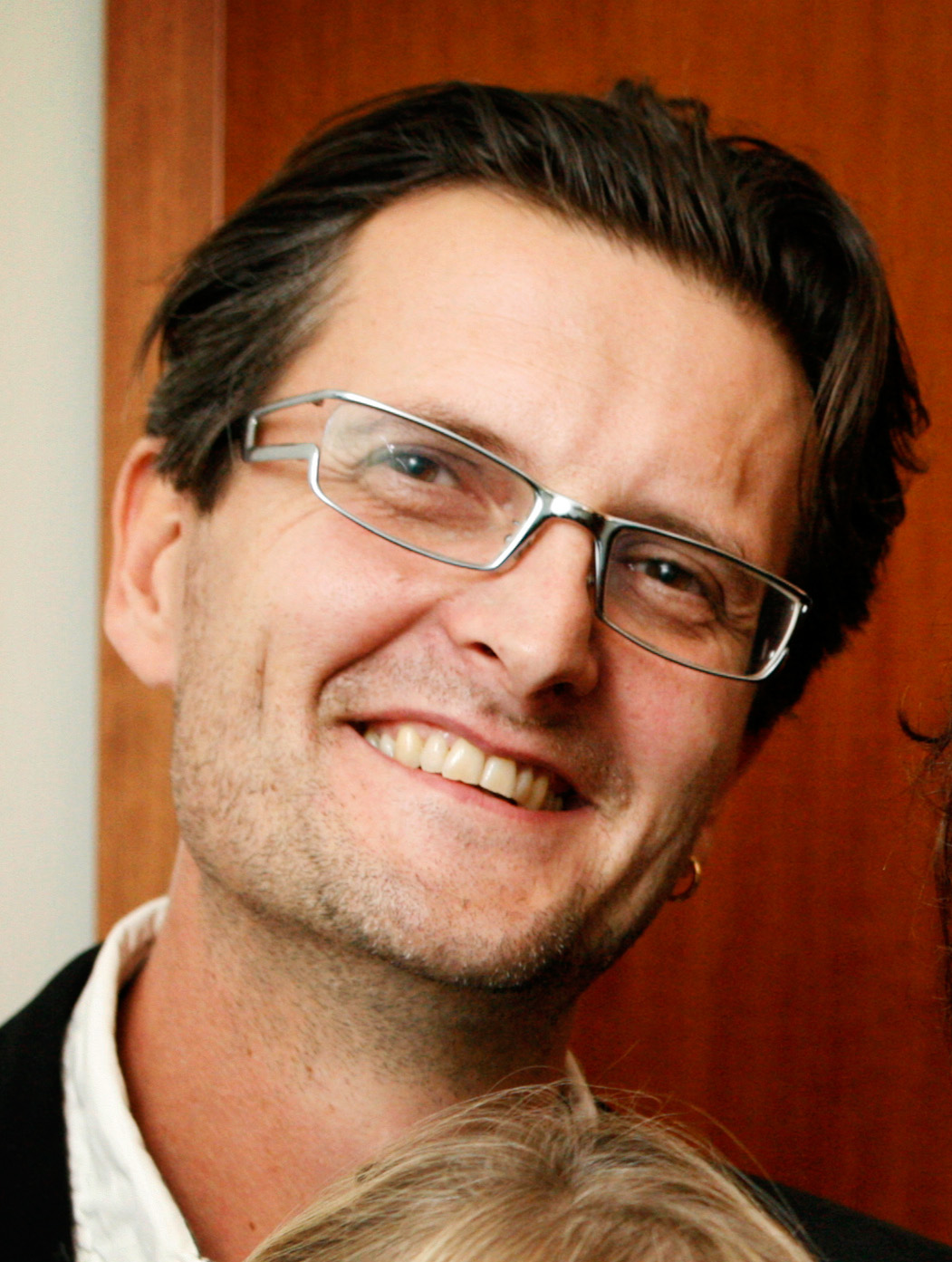
- Per Fly (2005)
- Born: Per Fly Plejdrup; 14 January 1960 (age 66); Skive, Denmark
- Occupation: Film director
- Spouse: Charlotte Fich
- Children: 2

Per Fly Plejdrup (born 14 January 1960) is a Danish film director, generally credited simply as Per Fly. He has made many films and television shows broadcast on Danish television. Per Fly's awards includes the Crown Prince Couple's Culture Prize in 2005.

== Biography ==
Fly was born on 14 January 1960 in Skive, Denmark. He graduated from The National Film School of Denmark in 1993. He debuted in 2000 with the feature film Bænken (The Bench), which told the story of Kaj, a man whose life has led him into serious alcoholism. This film was the first part of what would become the Denmark trilogy, which portrayed situations and characters from the lower, upper and middle classes in Denmark, in that order. The stop-motion animation film Prop og Berta (Prop and Berta, 2001) followed Bænken, but was not part of the trilogy. The trilogy continued with Arven (The Inheritance, 2003) depicting the upper class, and the middle class in Drabet (Manslaughter, 2005).

In 2007 he shot a series entitled Forestillinger, broadcast on Danish television Danmarks Radio. It pivots on the same period of time from the perspective of six different people, whose life situations overlap and intertwine. The meaning of the word Forestillinger is ambiguous in Danish language, and can refer to "conceptions" or (as in "conceptions about one self") as well as "plays" or "shows" in the theatrical sense. It was titled "Performances" for the English-subtitled DVD release.

With the exception of Prop og Berta, the nature of Per Fly's filmography is centered on the lives of ordinary people, in the vein of social realism. His films explore the conditions under which the characters are living, and try to validate or explain the choices they make through a detailed psychological and social depiction of the characters involved.

== Personal life ==
He is married to Danish actress Charlotte Fich. They have two sons.

== Filmography ==
- Kalder Kathrine! (1994, short movie)
- Bænken (2000)
- Prop og Berta (2001)
- Arven (2003)
- Manslaughter (2005)
- Antichrist (2009) – script consultant
- The Woman That Dreamed About a Man (2010)
- Monica Z (2013)
- Follow the Money (2016)
- Backstabbing for Beginners (2017)
- Hammarskjöld (2023)

== Other works ==
- Taxa, episode 31 (1998, TV series)
- Taxa, episode 32 (1998, TV series)
- Taxa, episode 33 (1998, TV series)
- Performances (Forestillinger) (2007, TV series)
- Secrets We Keep (2025, TV mini series)

== Awards ==
- 2001: Bodil award for best movie, Bænken
- 2005: Nordic Council Film Prize, Manslaughter
- 2005: Crown Prince Couple's Culture Prize
- 2006: Bodil award for best movie, Manslaughter
