= Telemark Museum =

- Location: Øvregate 41, 3715 Skien
- Coordinates: 59°12′32″N 9°36′54″E
- Type: Cultural history museum
- Director: Jorunn Sem Fure
- Chairperson: Georg Aubert
- Curator: Ellen Rodvang
- Website: https://www.telemarkmuseum.no/

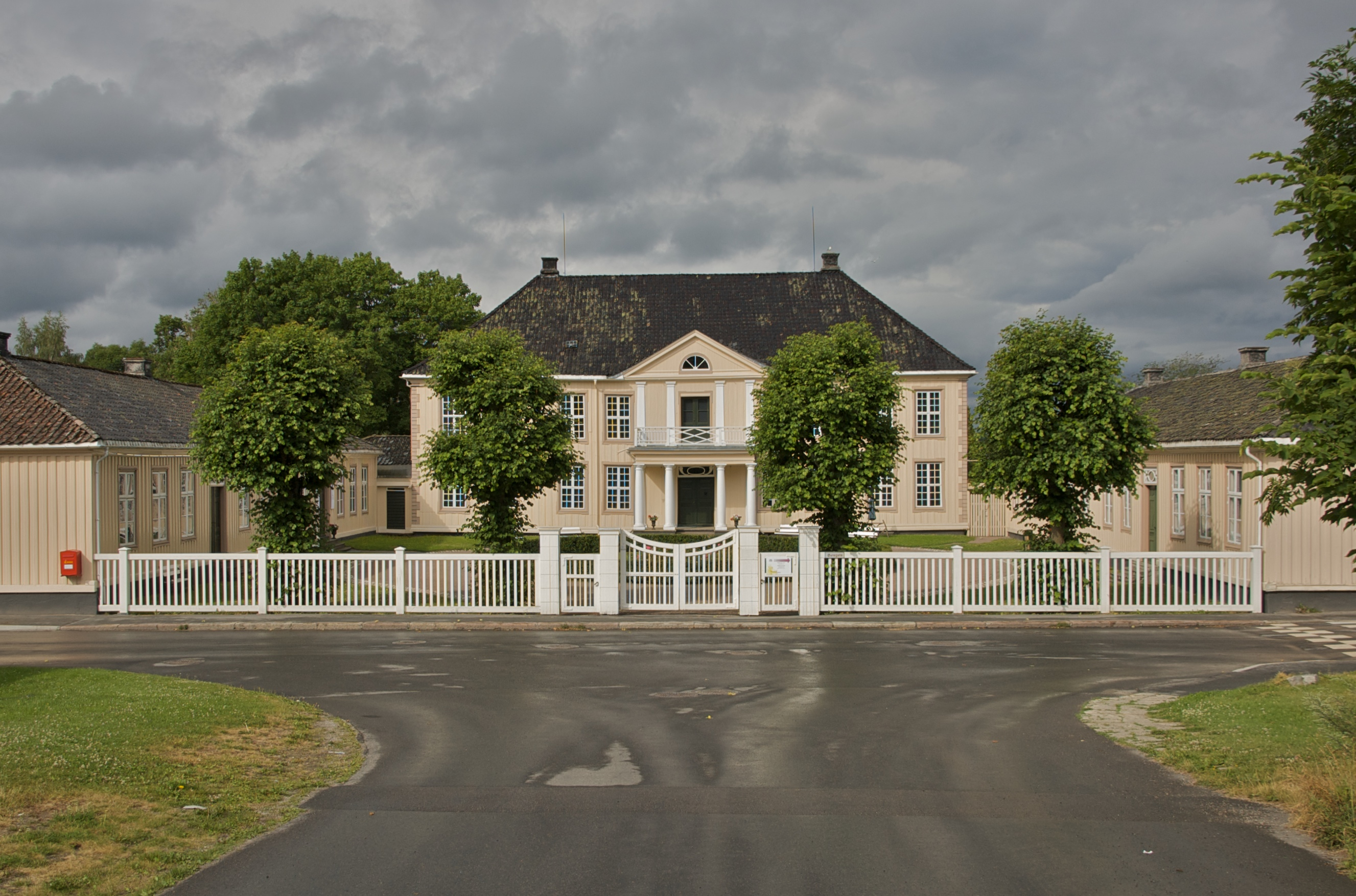
Søndre Brekke Manor

The Telemark Museum is a museum in Telemark, Norway. It includes several buildings across Telemark and is headquartered in Kleiva in the older part of Skien in Telemark county, Norway. The main museum building is located within walking distance of downtown Skien. Telemark Museum includes the Henrik Ibsen Museum in Skien.

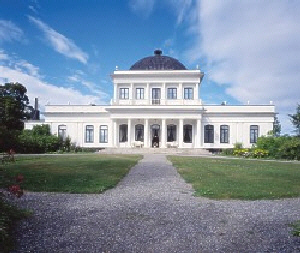
Ulefos Manor

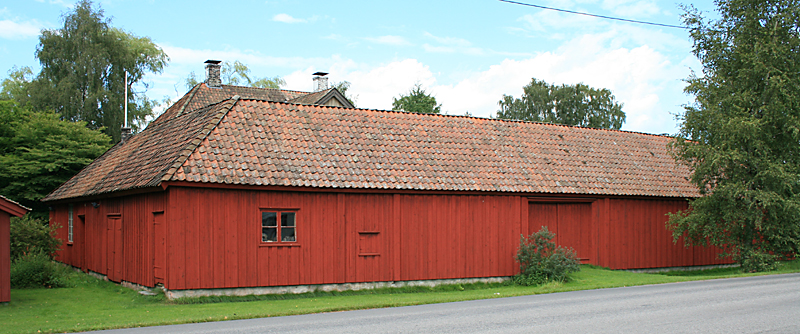
Porsgrunn City Museum

== History ==
Telemark Museum is a consolidated museum which included a number of museums within the Telemark area. It was founded in 1909 from a base at the Søndre Brekke farm. The farm is surrounded by Brekkeparken, a 36-acre (150,000 m^{2}) park. The main attraction, aside from seasonal exhibits in the main halls of the farm house, is the outdoor museum. Several older houses and farms from the former county of Telemark have been moved from their original location and rebuilt on site in the park.

Telemark Museum, the current name since 1998, was previously organized under the name of the County Museum of Telemark and Grenland. It includes the Porcelain Museum (Porselensmuseet), Theodor Kittelsen’s childhood home (Kittelsenhuset), Henrik Ibsen Museum including his childhood home (Venstøp), the Porsgrunn City Museum (Porsgrunn Bymuseum), Porsgrunn Maritime Museum (Sjøfartsmuseet Porsgrunn), Jønnevald Bus Factory Museum (Jønnevald Rutebilanlegg), Ulefos Manor (Ulefos Hovedgaard), plus Bamble Coastal Museum, Bø Museum and Brevik City Museum.

== Søndre Brekke Manor ==
Søndre Brekke Manor is the principal attraction, with the main building from the 18th century located within the park. The building received its final form from the owner cabinet minister, Nils Aall (1769–1854). The English style landscape park was established 1815. The spacious wings contain a number of special collections. In 1911, three peasant huts were moved to Brekkeparken. It has since developed into a large open-air museum with buildings from the Middle Ages until the 19th century, some with rose-painted interiors. Additional building were added in 1934 and 1958. The latter has fine examples of folk art from Telemark.

The indoor museum has a special permanent collection of folk art from all over Telemark. Recently, the museum hosted an exhibit on the life of Vidkun Quisling, generating a lot of publicity. The park also has a restaurant and outdoor cafe with a view of the river and downtown Skien.

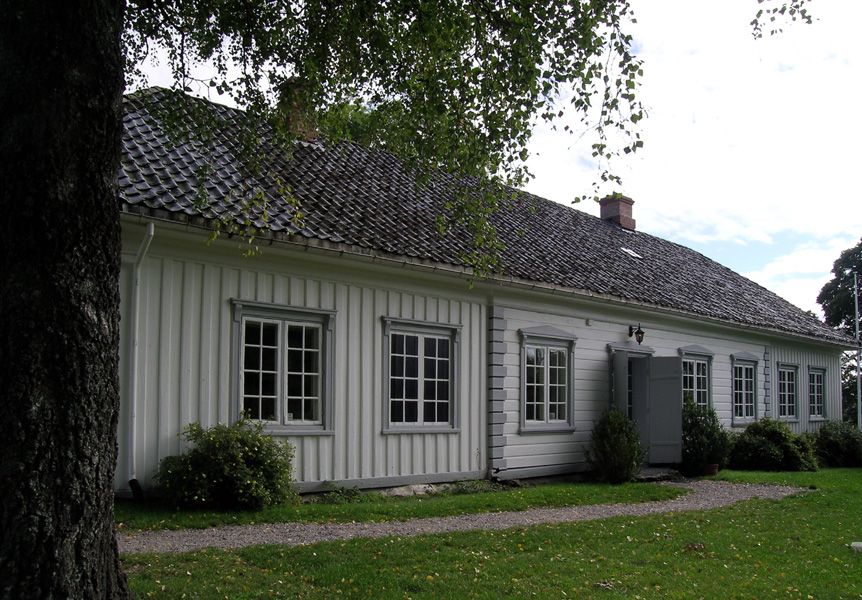
Venstøp main building

== Henrik Ibsen Museum ==
Henrik Ibsen Museum is on the site of the Venstøp farm in Skien Municipality, 5 kilometres (3.1 mi) from the center of Skien. In 1835 the Ibsen family moved out to Venstøp and stayed there for 7 years. This is where playwright Henrik Ibsen lived starting when he was 7 until he was 15 years old. The museum mainly focuses on the themes of childhood, adolescence and schooling, and shows how much this period of life actually meant to Ibsen's life and later work. The director of the Henrik Ibsen Museum is Jørgen Haave.

== Berg-Kragerø Museum ==
Telemark Museum also includes Berg-Kragerø Museum, the city museum in Kragerø. Berg-Kragerø Museum was founded in 1928, and received considerable collections. These were stored around town until Henriette Homan (1866–1943) by testament bestowed her farm Berg to the museum. The farm is situated approximately 4 km from the center of Kragerø and has a main building from 1803, surrounded by parks, forests and beach areas, besides residential leaseholder and operations building. The bequest also included contents dating from 1650. The museum was opened to the public during 1955. The new museum building was completed in 1979. The museum also owns the childhood home of artist, Theodor Kittelsen.

== Ulefos Manor ==
Ulefos Manor was built by Norwegian businessman and minister, Nils Aall, brother of statesman, Jacob Aall. It was the summer residence for the family. The manor house was completed in 1807 after a construction period of approx. 5 years. In addition to the elegant main building, the museum also has a carriage museum with more vehicles and travel gear from the Manor, a restored earth cellar, game room and greenhouse. The main building is surrounded by a large park in English style. Ulefoss Art Society Gallery is located in the outbuilding of the main garden.
