= List of Danish films of the 1980s =

The following table is a list of films produced in Denmark or in the Danish language during the 1980s. For an alphabetical list of all Danish films currently on Wikipedia see Category:Danish films. For Danish films from other decades see the Cinema of Denmark box above.

Danish Title	English Title	Director(s)	Cast	Genre	Notes
1980
Næste Stop Paradis	Next Stop Paradise	Jon Bang Carlsen	Karen Lykkehus, Otto Brandenburg, Inger Stender	Romance	
Sådan er Jeg Osse	That's Me, Too	Lise Roos	Stine Sylvestersen	Drama	Last film of Inger Stender
1981
Jeppe på bjerget	Jeppe on the Mountain	Kaspar Rostrup	Buster Larsen, Else Benedikte Madsen, Henning Jensen	Comedy	Bodil Award for Best Danish Film (1981), entered into Moscow
Kundskabens træ	Tree of Knowledge	Nils Malmros	Eva Gram Schjoldager; Jan Johansen	Drama	Listed in Denmark's cultural canon and screened at the 1982 Cannes Film Festival
Langturschauffør		Peter Ringgaard	Otto Brandenburg, Kirstin Olesen	Family	
Har du Set Alice?	Have You Seen Alice?	Brita Wielopolska	Heidi Zahle Thomsen	Drama	
Gummi-Tarzan	Rubber Tarzan	Søren Kragh-Jacobsen	Alex Svanbjerg, Otto Brandenburg	Family Drama	Bodil Award for Best Danish Film (1982)
1982
Thorvald og Linda	Thorvald and Linda Lene Grønlykke; Sven Grønlykke	Stina Ekblad, Carsten Blad	Drama		
Kidnapning	Kidnapping	Sven Methling	Michael Nezer	Family	
Tre engle og fem løver	Three Angels and Five Lions	Sven Methling	Michael Nezer	Comedy	
1983
Der er et yndigt land		Morten Arnfred			Entered into the 33rd Berlin International Film Festival
Skønheden og udyret	Beauty and the Beast	Nils Malmros	Line Arlien Soeborg, Jesper Klein	Drama	Bodil Award for Best Danish Film; Robert Award; Entered into the 34th Berlin International Film Festival
Zappa		Bille August			Screened at the 1983 Cannes Film Festival and the 13th Moscow International Film Festival
1984
Tro, håb og kærlighed	Twist and Shout	Bille August	Adam Tønsberg, Camilla Søeberg, Lars Simonsen, Ulrikke Bondo	Drama	Lars Simonsen won Best Actor at the 14th Moscow International Film Festival, Won 4 Robert Award
Forbrydelsens Element	The Element of Crime	Lars von Trier	Michael Elphick	Thriller	Bodil Award for Best Danish Film and entered into the 1984 Cannes Film Festival
Midt om natten	In the Middle of the Night	Erik Balling	Kim Larsen, Erik Clausen, Birgitte Raaberg	Comedy	
1985
Manden i Månen	Dark Side of the Moon	Erik Clausen	Christina Bengtsson, Yavuzer Cetinkaya	Romance	Bodil Award for Best Danish Film
1986
Ballerup Boulevard		Linda Wendel	Stine Bierlich		
Barndommens gade	Early Spring	Astrid Henning-Jensen			Entered into the 15th Moscow International Film Festival
1987
Babette's Gæstebud	Babette's Feast	Gabriel Axel	Stéphane Audran, Bodil Kjer, Birgitte Federspiel	Drama	Academy Award for Best Foreign Film, screened at Cannes
Pelle Erobreren	Pelle the Conqueror	Bille August	Max von Sydow; Pelle Hvenegaard	Drama	Academy Award for Best Foreign Film, Bodil Award for Best Danish Film, Palme D'Or
Epidemic		Lars von Trier			Screened at the 1987 Cannes Film Festival
1988
Ved vejen	Katinka	Max von Sydow			Screened at the 1988 Cannes Film Festival
Skyggen af Emma	Emma's Shadow	Søren Kragh-Jacobsen	Line Kruse, Börje Ahlstedt	Comedy	Bodil Award for Best Danish Film; Robert Award
1989
Atlantic Rhapsody - 52 myndir úr Tórshavn	Atlantic Rhapsody	Katrin Ottarsdóttir	Páll Danielsen	Children's	First Faroese film
Dansen med Regitze	Waltzing Regitze also Memories of a Marriage	Kaspar Rostrup	Ghita Nørby, Frits Helmuth	Drama	won Bodil Award for Best Danish Film, nominated for Academy Award for Best Foreign Film
Kærlighed uden stop	Love Without End	Hans Kristensen	Otto Brandenburg, Benny Hansen		
