= Robert Award for Best Actress in a Leading Role =

Danish film award

The Robert Award for Best Actress in a Leading Role (Danish: Robert Prisen for årets kvindelige hovedrolle) is a Danish Film Academy award presented at the annual Robert Award ceremony to recognize an actress who has delivered an outstanding leading performance in a Danish film.

== Honorees ==
=== 1980s ===
- 1984: Line Arlien-Søborg – Skønheden og udyret
- 1985: Bodil Udsen – Min farmors hus
- 1986: Stine Bierlich – Ofelia kommer til byen
- 1987: Kirsten Lehfeldt – Coeurs flambés
- 1988: Stéphane Audran – Babettes gæstebud
- 1989: Karina Skands – Himmel og helvede

=== 1990s ===
- 1990: Ghita Nørby – Waltzing Regitze
- 1991: Dorota Pomykała – Kajs fødselsdag
- 1992: Ghita Nørby – Freud Leaving Home
- 1993: Louise Hassing Nielsen – Pain of Love
- 1994: Sofie Gråbøl – Sort høst
- 1995: Kirsten Rolffes – The Kingdom
- 1996: Puk Scharbau – Kun en pige
- 1997: Emily Watson – Breaking the Waves
- 1998: Sidse Babett Knudsen – Let's Get Lost
- 1999: Bodil Jørgensen – The Idiots

=== 2000s ===
- 2000: Sidse Babett Knudsen – The One and Only
- 2001: Björk for Dancer in the Dark
  - Marianne Frost nominated for Break Your Bounds
  - Ann Eleonora Jørgensen nominated for Italian for Beginners
  - Ghita Nørby nominated for A Place Nearby
  - Anette Støvelbæk nominated for Italian for Beginners
- 2002: Stine Stengade for Kira's Reason: A Love Story
  - Sofie Gråbøl nominated for Grev Axel
  - Susanne Juhasz nominated for One-Hand Clapping
  - Sidse Babett Knudsen nominated for Mona's World
  - Charlotte Munck nominated for Shake It All About
- 2003: Paprika Steen for Okay
  - Anne-Grethe Bjarup Riis nominated for Halalabad Blues
  - Maria Bonnevie nominated for I Am Dina
  - Trine Dyrholm nominated for P.O.V. - Point of View
  - Sonja Richter nominated for Open Hearts
- 2004: Birthe Neumann for Move Me
  - Iben Hjejle nominated for Skagerak
  - Susanne Juhasz nominated for Regel nr. 1
  - Sidse Babett Knudsen nominated for Old, New, Borrowed and Blue
  - Stephanie Leòn nominated for Bagland
- 2005: Sofie Gråbøl for Aftermath
  - Laura Drasbæk nominated for Lost Generation
  - Ann Eleonora Jørgensen nominated for In Your Hands
  - Lena Endre nominated for Day and Night
  - Sonja Richter nominated for Villa Paranoia
- 2006: Sofie Gråbøl for Accused
  - Lene Maria Christensen nominated for Store Planer
  - Trine Dyrholm nominated for Flies on the Wall
  - Bryce Dallas Howard nominated for Manderlay
  - Birthe Neumann nominated for Solkongen
- 2007: Trine Dyrholm for A Soap
  - Laura Bro nominated for Rene hjerter
  - Lene Maria Christensen nominated for Fidibus
  - Laura Christensen nominated for Råzone
  - Sidse Babett Knudsen nominated for After the Wedding
- 2008: Noomi Rapace for Daisy Diamond
  - Rikke Louise Andersson nominated for White Night
  - Bodil Jørgensen nominated for Just like Home
  - Julie Kolbech nominated for The Art of Crying
  - Paprika Steen nominated for The Substitute
- 2009: Lene Maria Christensen for Terribly Happy
  - Trine Dyrholm nominated for Little Soldier
  - Rosalinde Mynster nominated for Worlds Apart
  - Paprika Steen nominated for Fear Me Not
  - Julie Ølgaard nominated for Crying for Love

=== 2010s ===
- 2010: Paprika Steen for Applause
  - Charlotte Gainsbourg nominated for Antichrist
  - Birgitte Hjort Sørensen nominated for At World's End
  - Stephanie Leon nominated for Hush Little Baby
  - Simone Tang nominated for Aching Hearts
- 2011: Trine Dyrholm for In a Better World
  - Julie Brochorst Andersen nominated for Hold om mig
  - Annette Heick nominated for Olsen Gang Gets Polished
  - Ellen Hillingsø nominated for The Experiment
  - Mille Hoffmeyer Lehfeldt nominated for Smukke mennesker
- 2012: Kirsten Dunst for Melancholia
  - Lene Maria Christensen nominated for A Family
  - Frederikke Dahl Hansen nominated for Frit fald
  - Barbara Garcia nominated for Rosa Morena
  - Tuva Novotny nominated for IDA
- 2013: Bodil Jørgensen for Hvidstengruppen and Trine Dyrholm for Love Is All You Need
- 2014: Helle Fagralid for Sorg og glæde
- 2015: Bodil Jørgensen for All Inclusive
- 2016: Tuva Novotny for A War
  - Bodil Jørgensen nominated for Mennesker bliver spist
  - Ghita Nørby nominated for Key House Mirror
  - Marie Tourell Søderberg nominated for Steppeulven
  - Mille Hoffmeyer Lehfeldt nominated for Lang historie kort
- 2017: Trine Dyrholm for Kollektivet
- 2018: Amanda Collin for En frygtelig kvinde
- 2019: Katrine Greis-Rosenthal for Lykke-Per

=== 2020s ===
- 2020: Trine Dyrholm for Dronningen
- 2021: Andrea Heick Gadeberg for Riders of Justice
- 2022: Birthe Neumann for The Pact
- 2023: Zar Amir Ebrahimi for Holy Spider
- 2024: Paprika Steen for Toves værelse
- 2025: Viilbjørk Malling Agger for Fuld af kærlighed
- 2026: Özlem Saglanmak for Det andet offer

== See also ==
- Bodil Award for Best Actress in a Leading Role
