= 10th Robert Awards =

1993 Danish film awards ceremony

- Date: 1993
- Organized by: Danish Film Academy

The 10th Robert Awards ceremony was held in 1993 in Copenhagen, Denmark. Organized by the Danish Film Academy, the awards honoured the best in Danish and foreign film of 1992.

== Honorees ==
=== Best Danish Film ===
- Pain of Love – Nils Malmros

=== Best Actor in a Leading Role ===
- Søren Østergaard – Pain of Love

=== Best Actress in a Leading Role ===
- Anne Louise Hassing – Pain of Love

=== Best Actor in a Supporting Role ===
- Jesper Christensen – Sofie

=== Best Actress in a Supporting Role ===
- Ghita Nørby – Sofie

=== Best Cinematography ===
- Jan Weincke – Pain of Love

=== Production Design ===
- Peter Høimark – Sofie

=== Costume Design ===
- Jette Termann – Sofie

=== Best Makeup ===
- Cecilia Drott – Sofie

=== Best Sound Design ===
- Niels Arild – Pain of Love

=== Best Editing ===
- Birger Møller Jensen – Pain of Love

=== Best Score ===
- Joachim Holbek & Billy Cross – Russian Pizza Blues

=== Best Documentary Short ===
- Hjerter i slør by Jesper W. Nielsen & Brev til Jonas by Susanne Bier

=== Best Foreign Film ===
- Strictly Ballroom – Baz Luhrmann

== See also ==
- 1993 Bodil Awards
