= Pyrus (TV series) =

- Created by: Martin Miehe-Renard
- Starring: Jan Linnebjerg; Paul Hüttel; Christiane Bjørg Nielsen; Jesper Klein; Jeanne Boel; Steen Stig Lommer; Karen Gardelli; Henrik H. Lund; Søren Østergaard; Niccié Jølst; Nicolé Jølst
- Country of origin: Denmark
- No. of seasons: 4
- No. of episodes: 96

Production
- Running time: 25 minutes

Original release
- Network: TV 2 (Denmark)
- Release: 1 December 1994 – 24 December 2000

Pyrus is a julekalender (Christmas calendar) TV series broadcast on the Danish television station TV2 during Christmas in Denmark. Originally aired as four semi-independent seasons, the series includes Alletiders Jul (1994), Alletiders Nisse (1995), Alletiders Julemand (1997), and Alletiders Eventyr (2000). It also inspired a spin-off feature film, Pyrus på Pletten, which premiered on Christmas Eve in 2000.

The series follows Pyrus, an elf or nisse (a term cognate with "elf," but in this context specifically referring to a Christmas elf), who lives inside a box in the National Archives of Denmark alongside other elves named Kandis and Gyldengrød. Gyldengrød serves as the elf archivist, while Pyrus and Kandis are his apprentices. The human archivist, Birger Bertramsen, works at the archives with his daughter, Josefine Brahe, who is his trainee. Both the humans and the elves' study national history, though their methods differ. The elves can magically transport themselves into both fiction and history books to gather first-hand information from the characters within, whereas the humans rely on traditional research using the historical documents housed in the archives.

The central plot of the series revolves around Pyrus and his friends exploring the history of Denmark, particularly the history of Danish Christmas and related traditions. The titles of the series are a double entendre, as Alletiders can mean both "Great" and "Of all times."

The first season, aired in 1994, was titled Alletiders Jul (Christmas for the Ages), followed by Alletiders Nisse (Elf for the Ages), Alletiders Julemand (Santa Claus for the Ages), and Alletiders Eventyr (Fairy Tale for the Ages). Each season focuses on a specific theme: the general concept of Christmas, the elf, the figure of Santa Claus, and fairy tales, respectively.

== Main cast ==
- Jan Linnebjerg as Pyrus, the young apprentice elf at the National Archives in Copenhagen.
- Paul Hüttel as von Guttenborg/von Gyldengrød, the archive elf.
- Jesper Klein as Birger Bertramsen, the human archivist who lives illegally in his office at the Archives.
- Jeanne Boel as Josefine Brahe, Bertramsen's secretary and daughter.
- Christiane Bjørg Nielsen as Kandis, Pyrus's fellow apprentice at the Archives. She first appears in Alletiders Nisse.
- Søren Østergaard as Leif-Jørgen Krusø, a policeman assigned to investigate the Archives over Christmas, later becoming Josefine's husband. He first appears in Alletiders Julemand and is a reference to Inspector Clouseau.
- Karen Gardelli as Freja, a young woman with amnesia who cannot recall which book she fell out of. She only appears in Alletiders Jul. In reality, she is the goddess and spirit of Christmas, Xenobia.
- Steen Stig Lommer as Uffe Spage Andersen, a computer expert assigned to reform the Archives over Christmas. He only appears in Alletiders Nisse.
- Henrik H. Lund as Julle/Santa Claus. He only appears in Alletiders Julemand.
- Niccie and Nicole Jølst as Mille and Molly, the twin nieces of Krusø. They only appear in Alletiders Eventyr.

== The plots ==
=== Alletiders Jul ===
On the first of December, Pyrus, a young, undisciplined, and lazy elf, arrives at the elfbo (Elf Dwelling) in the National Archives of Denmark. He is set to be the trainee of Gyldengrød, the archive elf, for a year. However, Pyrus is only interested in eating and sleeping. Gyldengrød, an old and highly intelligent elf, attempts to spark Pyrus's interest in the history of Denmark, but Pyrus finds it dull. Meanwhile, in the human world, archivist Bertramsen meets his new secretary, Josefine Brahe, on the same day.

As soon as Gyldengrød leaves Pyrus alone with his spellbook, Pyrus becomes curious and decides to try some magic. However, he makes a mess of it, accidentally conjuring an earthquake. In the resulting chaos, he discovers a girl with amnesia, who appears to have fallen out of one of the books in the archive.

The next day, Gyldengrød realizes that the problem is far worse than initially thought—Christmas has disappeared. No one outside the Archives has any memory of Christmas, except for Gyldengrød, Pyrus, Bertramsen, and Josefine.

Over the course of 24 episodes, Gyldengrød, Pyrus, and the amnesiac Freja search for Christmas and Freja's true identity by using magic to interact with the history books. Meanwhile, Bertramsen and Josefine work to rediscover and reintroduce Christmas through traditional research into Denmark's history.

Alletiders Jul was broadcast on TV2 in 1994 and rebroadcast in 2004.

=== Alletiders Nisse ===
Pyrus has just returned home from the Elf University and plans to relax during his vacation. However, Gyldengrød reminds him that Elf University students are required to write a paper during their holiday. Pyrus's assignment is to answer the question, "Hvad er en elf?" (English: "What is an elf?").

To complete the task, Pyrus discovers he must work with a classmate, Kandis, a sweet and highly intelligent female elf. Over the course of the 24 episodes, Pyrus and Kandis travel into various books, including works of fiction, fairy tales, fables, children's literature, and other texts, to research their paper.

In the human world, the National Archives of Denmark is scheduled to be torn down, with all national history digitized and moved to an electronic data processing (EDP) system. Uffe Spage Andersen, an EDP expert, is tasked with digitizing the entire collection.

Bertramsen and Josefine work to convince the government not to demolish the Archives by proving something that cannot be found online: the existence of elves. Throughout the series, Bertramsen and Josefine read everything they can about elves, but since no one has ever seen an elf, they struggle to provide proof.

One day, Uffe Andersen, unaware of their presence, accidentally locks Kandis inside a closet. To rescue her, Pyrus and Gyldengrød are forced to break elf law by revealing themselves to the humans.

Alletiders Nisse was broadcast on TV2 in 1995 and rebroadcast in 2006.

=== Alletiders Julemand ===
Pyrus is frustrated that elves do not receive presents from Santa Claus at Christmas. In an attempt to change this, he writes a letter to Santa, which results in Santa Claus arriving at the National Archives of Denmark the following day. Unaware that Santa has already arrived, Pyrus steals Gyldengrød's magic book and tries to bring Santa Claus to the Archives from a book about him, which leads to Santa developing amnesia.

Christmas is now in great danger because without Santa Claus, there will be no Christmas presents, and without presents, Christmas will be very sad. Pyrus, Gyldengrød, Kandis, Bertramsen, and Josefine all work together to rediscover the myth of Santa Claus, teaching him about himself in the hope that he will become Santa Claus once again.

Alletiders Julemand was broadcast on TV2 in 1997 and rebroadcast in 2007 and 2014.

=== Alletiders Eventyr ===
Bertramsen is tasked by the Royal Family with assembling a collection of fairy tales for the newborn prince. However, by accident, Pyrus magically combines all the fairy tales into one large book of randomly jumbled snippets. Meanwhile, Krusø is looking after his nieces over Christmas. While playing with the elves, one of the twins gets lost in the book.

Now, Pyrus, Kandis, Gyldengrød, Bertramsen, and Josefine must find the lost girl and rediscover all the fairy tales to restore them to their proper order in time for Christmas.

Alletiders Eventyr was broadcast on TV2 in 2000.
