= 1st Robert Awards =

1984 Danish film awards ceremony

- Date: 1984
- Organized by: Danish Film Academy

Highlights
- Best Film: Beauty and the Beast
- Most awards: Thunderbirds (6)
- Most nominations: Thunderbirds (6)

The 1st Robert Awards ceremony was held in 1984 in Copenhagen, Denmark. Organized by the Danish Film Academy, the awards honoured the best in Danish and foreign film of 1983.

== Honorees ==
=== Best Danish Film ===
- Beauty and the Beast – Nils Malmros

=== Best Screenplay ===
- Nils Malmros – Beauty and the Beast

=== Best Actor in a Leading Role ===
- Jesper Klein – Beauty and the Beast

=== Best Actress in a Leading Role ===
- Line Arlien-Søborg – Beauty and the Beast

=== Best Actor in a Supporting Role ===
- Hans Christian Ægidius – Forræderne

=== Best Actress in a Supporting Role ===
- Mette Munk Plum – Thunderbirds

=== Best Cinematography ===
- Dan Laustsen – Thunderbirds

=== Best Production Design ===
- Palle Nybo Arestrup – Thunderbirds

=== Best Costume Design ===
- Annelise Hauberg – Forræderne

=== Best Special Effects ===
- Eg Norre – Thunderbirds

=== Best Editing ===
- Janus Billeskov Jansen – Thunderbirds

=== Best Sound Design ===
- Jan Juhler – Thunderbirds

=== Best Score ===
- Leif Sylvester Petesen – Rocking Silver

=== Best Documentary Short ===
- Motivation – Anne Wivel & Arne Bro

=== Best Foreign Film ===
- Sophie's Choice – Alan Pakula

== See also ==
- 1984 Bodil Awards
