= Line Arlien-Søborg =

Danish actress and film director

- Born: 25 July 1966 (age 58); Århus, Denmark
- Occupation(s): Actress director
- Years active: 1981–present

Line Arlien-Søborg (born 25 July 1966) is a Danish former actress and film director. In 1984, she received the Bodil and Robert Best Actress awards for the film Skønheden og udyret.

== Film career ==
In 1981, Arlien-Søborg first received attention for her role as the conniving schoolgirl, Anne-Mette, in Nils Malmros's coming-of-age drama Tree of Knowledge (Kundskabens træ). Filming for the role was performed over a two-year period, while Arlien-Søborg was 13 to 15 years old, to realistically show her character's physical and emotional maturation. Two years later, Arlien-Søborg performed the lead in Malmros' 1983 drama Skønheden og udyret (Beauty and the Beast). Malmos wrote the role of the sexually blossoming 16-year-old Mette specifically for Arlien-Søborg for which she was awarded both the 1984 Bodil and Robert awards for Best Actress.

In 1986 Arlien-Søborg performed in the Danish television miniseries Kaj Munk and she once again performed for Malmros in his 1989 film Århus by Night. After completing an education in literature history, she worked for Denmark's DR Television studio where she wrote and directed the miniseries Derude med snøren. Arlien-Søborg subsequently worked as an assistant director for Malmros on two films, 2002's At kende sandheden (Facing the Truth) and Kærestesorger (in post-production in 2008).

She dissolved her friendship with Malmros in 2013 following the release of his autobiographical film Sorrow and Joy (Danish: Sorg og glæde). Arlien-Søborg said that the film's portrayal of a mutual flirtation between her teenage self and Malmros was false; and that she believed Malmros had fictionalized the episode to absolve himself of sexualizing and trying to seduce a child.

Since 2014, Arlien-Søborg has worked as a teacher in Danish Language and Media Studies at a Gymnasium (upper secondary school) in Skanderborg.

== Personal life ==
Arlien-Søborg lives in Risskov with her husband and their two children.

== Filmography ==
Year	Title	Original title	Credit	Notes
1981	Tree of Knowledge	Kundskabens træ	Actress ... Anne-Mette	
1983	Beauty and the Beast	Skønheden og udyret	Actress ... Mette	won Bodil Award for Best Actress won Robert Award for Best Actress
1986	Kaj Munk	Kaj Munk	Actress ... Lisbeth	(TV miniseries)
1989	Århus by Night	Århus by Night	Actress ... Lisa	
1998	Derude med snøren	Derude med snøren	Director writer	(TV miniseries)
2002	At kende sandheden	Facing the Truth	Assistant Director	
2008	Kærestesorger	Kærestesorger	Assistant Director	(post-production)
