= Barbara (1997 film) =

- DVD release cover
- Directed by: Nils Malmros
- Written by: John Mogensen; Nils Malmros; Jørgen-Frantz Jacobsen (novel)
- Produced by: Per Holst
- Starring: Anneke von der Lippe; Lars Simonsen
- Cinematography: Jan Weincke
- Edited by: Birger Møller Jensen
- Music by: Gunner Møller Pedersen
- Distributed by: Nordisk Film
- Release date: 3 October 1997
- Running time: 143 minutes
- Country: Denmark
- Language: Danish

Barbara is a 1997 Danish drama film directed by Nils Malmros and stars Anneke von der Lippe and Lars Simonsen. Adapted from the classic Faroese novel by writer Jørgen-Frantz Jacobsen, the film is about a minister in the 18th century who is captivated by the overt sexuality of a promiscuous woman and marries her. Set in the Faroe Islands, the film was Malmros' first diversion from his usual subject of adolescents in Århus, and his own experiences.

Malmros describes Barbara as "a melodrama -a depiction of grandiose feelings set against a magnificent natural background, told with a wonderfully ironic undertone."

== Plot ==
The aptly named ship Fortuna arrives in Tórshavn, bringing Poul (Lars Simonsen), the new pastor for the parish of Vágar, and the populace has gathered for the event. Among them is Barbara (Anneke von der Lippe), the widow of two former pastors for whose untimely deaths she is blamed by many. Pastor Poul is warned about her but falls for her charms, despite the fact that when three French ships come to port she follows the example of most of the other women in the town and allows herself to be seduced by a French sailor. As the widow of the parish, she has a house of her own on Vágar, and she and Poul leave for their respective homes there. Inevitably, they marry, but when in Tórshavn on a subsequent visit, Barbara meets and falls for the foppish Andreas Heyde (Peter Reichhardt), on a research trip from Copenhagen. Poul persuades Barbara to leave with him; however, when Christmas approaches he feels duty-bound to visit the outlying island of Mykines, despite Barbara's entreaties that he not do so. Andreas has now arrived nearby to spend Christmas at the home of the chief magistrate of the island. Despite his misgivings, Poul answers the call of duty, hoping to return almost immediately, but inclement weather delays his return for eleven days, and on his return he discovers that Barbara has left for Tórshavn with Andreas. After a confrontation between Poul and Andreas, instigated by Gabriel, Andreas is finally persuaded to leave for Copenhagen, without Barbara, and she makes a desperate and futile attempt to reach his ship, once more the Fortuna, as it leaves.

== Cast ==
Actor	Role
Anneke von der Lippe	Barbara
Lars Simonsen	Poul Aggersoee
Trond Høvik	Gabriel
Jesper Christensen	Sorenskriveren (Judge)
Jens Okking	Lagmanden
Helene Egelund	Susanne
Jytte Kvinesdal	Anna Sophie
Peter Hesse Overgaard	Hr. Wenzel
Ove Pedersen	Landfogden
Peter Reichhardt	Andreas Heyde
Henning Jensen	Provst Anders Morsing
Bodil Udsen	Armgard
Birgitte Federspiel	Ellen Katrine
Henny Moan	Magdalene

== Awards ==
Barbara received the Audience Award at the Rouen Nordic Film Festival as well as the 1998 Robert Award for Best Film. It was Denmark's submission for the 1998 Academy Award for Best Foreign Film, but was not accepted as a nominee. The film was also entered into the 48th Berlin International Film Festival.

== See also ==
- List of submissions to the 70th Academy Awards for Best Foreign Language Film
- List of Danish submissions for the Academy Award for Best Foreign Language Film
