= Louise Fribo =

Danish singer, actress and dancer

- Born: Louise Fribo Eriksson; 3 July 1970 (age 56); Copenhagen, Denmark
- Genres: Opera, musical
- Occupations: Singer, dancer, actress
- Years active: 1986–present
- Labels: EMI, DG
- Website: www.louisefribo.com

Louise Fribo (born 3 July 1970) is a Danish theatre performer, singer, actress and dancer.

== Career ==
Fribo, who studied the violin from age 4 and was trained as a classical dancer from age 7, made her motion picture debut as Lisa in the 1986 Danish feature film Barndommens gade (Childhood's Street) based on a novel by Tove Ditlevsen and directed by Palme d'Or winning director Astrid Henning-Jensen.

Fribo attended from 1986 to 1989 the Bush Davies School of Theatre Arts in East Grinstead and made her stage debut in Andrew Lloyd Webber's musical Cats at Operettenhaus Hamburg, where she sang the part of Cinderella in Stephen Sondheim's Into the Woods in the 1990–91 season. Her Danish stage debut came in 1991 as Cosette in Les Misérables on Odense Teater.

Fribo graduated from the Royal Danish Opera Academy in 2003 as a coloratura soprano and had her German opera debut as Zerbinetta in Ariadne auf Naxos on Theater Lübeck in April 2004. Since then she has sung at several theaters in Europe – in 2006 she participated in the Salzburg Festival – and in 2011 she made her U.S. debut singing in the Michael Sturminger opera The Infernal Comedy alongside John Malkovich.

Louise Fribo also gives concerts in Danish with Bent Fabricius Bjerre, and she gives church concerts.

She is the voice of the title character in the Danish dubbing of Mary Poppins and Belle in the dubbing of Disney's Beauty and the Beast and its sequels. She's also the voice of Ariel in The Little Mermaid II: Return to the Sea, The Little Mermaid: Ariel's Beginning and the tv series The Little Mermaid taking over the part from Marie Ingerslev and Sissel Kyrkjebo. She's also the voice of Miss Sensuella from Jungledyret Hugo 2 - den store filmhelt and Sasha the seahorse from Help! I'm a Fish.

On 24 October 2012, Louise Fribo created the role of Christine Daaé in Love Never Dies at the Det Ny Teater in Denmark. In 2015 she returned there to play the Mother Abbess in The Sound of Music.

== Personal life ==
She is, since 2013, no longer in a relationship with the father (David Springborg) of their two children.

== Recordings ==
- 2012 CD Look with your Heart (Lloyd-Webber Album)
- 2012 CD Walking in the air (Christmas Album)
- 2007 CD: Coloratura Soprano
- 2006 DVD: Il sogno di Scipione
- 2004 CD: En Musikalsk Rejse (A Musical Journey)
- 2000 CD: Drømte mig en Drøm (Danish songs)
- 1997 CD: Glædelig Jul (A selection of Christmas carols)

== Awards ==
- 2008 Reumertprisen (The Reumert Award) – for Best Supporting Female Actress in The Tales of Hoffmann
- 2006 Generation con Brio – as Costanza in Mozart's Il sogno di Scipione at the Salzburg Festival
- 2003 Århus Sommeroperas Venner – as Blondchen in Mozart's Entführung
- 1992 Marguerite Vibys Jubilæumslegat (The Margurite Viby Award) – as Cunégonde in Bernstein's Candide
