= Jungle Jack =

Jungle Jack may refer to:

- "Jungle Jack" Hanna, an American zoo keeper and animal expert.
- Jungledyret Hugo, a Danish cartoon character sometimes translated "Jungle Jack" or "Amazon Jack".
