= Julie Brochorst Andersen =

Danish actress (born 1993)

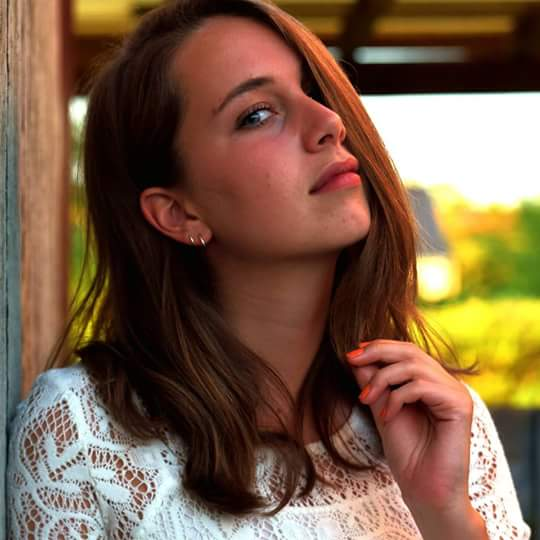
- Born: Julie Sandra Brochorst Andersen; 27 May 1993 (age 33); Copenhagen, Denmark
- Education: University of Copenhagen
- Years active: 2010–present
- Known for: Acting – Films and Television
- Notable work: Hold om mig
- Partner: Kevin Koch
- Awards: Best Actress, Ole Awards 2013 (You & Me Forever)

Julie Brochorst Andersen (born 27 May 1993) is a Danish actress. Her acting career began when, as a 15-year-old, she participated in a casting at school and went on to star in the teenage drama Hold me Tight.

== Filmography ==
- Mens Vi Lever (English: While We Live, 2017)
- Anti (2016)
- Hundeliv (English: Where Have All the Good Men Gone, 2016)
- Shiva (Short Film, 2015)
- Voxeværk (Short Film, 2015)
- Lækre til vi dør (Short Film, 2013)
- Mommy (Short Film, 2013)
- Ambulo (Short Film, 2012)
- You & Me Forever (2012)
- Hold om mig (English: Hold Me Tight, 2010)

== Television appearances ==
- Badehotellet (Seaside Hotel, 2019)
- Perfekte Steder (Perfect Places, 2016–2017)
- Alfa (Grow, 2020)

== Awards and nominations ==
- Best Actress, CPH Web Fest 2018 (Vitasminde, Winner)
- Best Actress, Ole 2013 (You & Me Forever, Winner)
- Best Actress, Bodil Award 2013 (You & Me Forever, Nominee)
- Best Actress, Zulu Awards 2011 (Hold om mig, Nominee)
- Best Actress, Robert Award 2011 (Hold om mig, Nominee)
- Best Actress, Bodil Award 2011 (Hold om mig, Nominee)
