= Facing the Truth (film) =

2002 film

- Front cover of the Danish DVD for Facing the Truth
- Directed by: Nils Malmros
- Written by: Nils Malmros; John Mogensen
- Produced by: Thomas Heinesen
- Starring: Jens Albinus; William Rosenberg; Lise Stegger
- Cinematography: Jan Weincke
- Edited by: Birger Møller Jensen
- Music by: Gunner Møller Pedersen
- Distributed by: Nordisk Film
- Release date: 25 October 2002
- Running time: 98 minutes
- Country: Denmark
- Language: Danish

Facing the Truth (Danish: At kende sandheden) is a 2002 Danish drama written and directed by Nils Malmros. Shot in black-and-white documentary style, and based on the real life of Malmros' father, the film relates the hardships of a young neurosurgeon struggling through a medical lawsuit. Malmros, whose films are known for their realism, is educated as a surgeon and performed all the film's brain surgery scenes. The film was nominated for the 2003 Bodil Award for Best Danish Film and won the 2003 Danish Film Academy's Robert Award for Film of the Year.

== Synopsis ==
The film opens in 1944, as a young fisherman who has suffered a stroke due to aneurysm is being attended to by a neurosurgeon, Dr. Richard Malmros (Jens Albinus). Malmros operates on the fisherman after injecting him with Thorotrast, a radioactive contrast medium, and the operation is a success. However, 42 years later, the patient develops liver cancer and dies. His widow sues the hospital claiming that the Thorotrast caused the liver cancer. The story flashes back through the life of Richard Malmros. As a child he lived in poverty. His father is unemployed due to World War I.

His childhood and later life are greatly influenced by his aunt who is a devout Christian and always warns about the danger of sin. The story continues through his schoolboy days, his university education, and his marriage, which he feels tricked into. The film focuses on the ambiguity of the 'truth' reported in the media as well as the personal dilemma that Richard Malmros faced: his knowledge of the dangers of Thorotrast, and the decision he had to make when there were no alternatives.

He could use the Thorotrast, or risk having them die right there, and this was a decision he had to make. The old Richard acknowledges that if he had known what he knows today, clearly some patients should not have been given Thorotrast. Although he is vindicated in court, he remains haunted by feelings of guilt, which he carries from the strong influence of his aunt in his childhood.

== Cast ==
Actor	Role
Jens Albinus	Richard Malmros as an adult
William Rosenberg	Richard Malmros as old man
Lise Stegger	Eli
Søren Østergaard	Malmros' son as an adult
Preben Hans	Pastor Bork
Peter Schrøder	Knoblau
Lasse Broust Andersen	Richard Malmros as child
Elin Reimer	Eli as old woman
Anni Bjørn	Aunt Johanne
Sofie Deplace Jørgensen	Eli's girlfriend
Mette Kolding	Ida's Mother
Malene Langborg	5. Classmate
Nynne Karen Nørlund	Karl's Mother
Bente Banemann	Waitress
Steffie Therese Mortensen	Eli at 11
Anette Becker	2. Classmate
Birthe Neuman	Eli's Mother
Camilla Helene Lind	Eli's girlfriend
Sina Houberg Jæger	Lotte 5-years-old
Birthe Backhausen	Grete Vedel
Søren Østergaard	Nils Malmros as an adult
Jørgen Brorsen	Elo's Father
Hother Bøndorf	Isaksen
Ida Dwinger	Richard's Mother
Birgit Sadolin	the Mother

== Awards ==
Facing the Truth won the Best Film at the 2003 Robert Awards. At the 2003 Mar del Plata Film Festival the film won Best Film and Nils Malmros received a Special Mention for "courage in portraying the ambiguity of truth." At the 2003 Bodil Awards the film was nominated for Best Danish Film and Jens Albinus won the Bodil for Best Actor.
