= Elga Olga Svendsen =

Danish actress

- Born: 14 April 1906; Copenhagen, Denmark
- Died: 26 July 1992 (aged 86); Denmark
- Occupations: Actress and singer
- Years active: 1934–1984

Elga Olga Svendsen (14 April 1906 – 26 July 1992) was a Danish film actress and singer. As Elga Olga she released one album and a dozen singles. She appeared in 15 films between 1934 and 1984. She was born in Copenhagen, Denmark and died in Denmark.

== Filmography ==
- 7-9-13 (1934)
- Thummelumsen (1941)
- Lykke på rejsen (1947)
- Vores fjerde far (1951)
- Frihed forpligter (1951)
- Kærlighedsdoktoren (1952)
- Krudt og klunker (1958)
- Pigen i søgelyset (1959)
- Mig og min lillebror (1967)
- Rend mig i revolutionen (1970)
- Snart dages det brødre (1974)
- Brand-Børge rykker ud (1976)
- Affæren i Mølleby (1976)
- Zappa (1983)
- Tro, håb og kærlighed (1984)

== Discography ==
- Elga Olga Med Willy Grevelunds Orkester: Elga Olga Af København (Sonet Records, 1976)
