= Poul Møller (disambiguation) =

Poul Møller (1919-1997) was a Danish politician.

Poul Møller may also refer to:

- Paul Barfoed Møller, from the film Jeppe på bjerget
- Poul Martin Møller (1794–1838), Danish academic, writer, and poet
