= Martha Christensen (Danish writer) =

Danish author (1926–1995)

Martha Johanne Christensen (1926–1995) was a Danish writer and educator. Around 1950, she contributed poems and short stories to the journal Vild Hvede but it was not until 1962 that she published her first novel Vær god ved Remond (Be Good to Remond) about the difficulties faced by a boy sent to an institution after his mother remarried. Like her later novels, it brings out the failures of social support. She is remembered in particular for Dansen med Regitze (Dancing with Regitze, 1987) telling the story of a married woman who valiantly approaches her death. In 1989, it was made into the award-winning film Waltzing Regitze. Her story of abandoned children Når mor kommer hjem (When Mother Comes Home) also led to a movie in 1995.

== Early life ==
Born on 12 June 1926 in Holsted in the west of Jutland, Martha Christensen was the daughter of the master smith Anders Christian Christensen (1878–1959) and his wife Johanne née Vinding (1892–1961). After completing her realskole education, she first attended a business school then embarked on a teachers' training course. She took a specialist course for early childhood educators and preschool teachers.

== Career ==
On completing her education, she spent a year working at an orphanage in Norway (1951–52). From 1952 until her retirement in 1986, she was employed by the Svanegården holiday home (fritidshjemmet Svanegården) in Odense.

From 1949, she contributed poetry and short stories to the journal Vild Hvede but it was not until 1962 that she published her first novel Vær god med Remond about the problems encountered by a mentally insecure boy who was sent to an institution after his mother remarried. Like her later works, it reveals the weaknesses of policies designed to provide social support. These concerns are conveyed in Manden som ville ingen ondt (The Man who Meant no Harm, 1989), Som de vil ha' dig (As They Want You To Be. 1974) about an orphanage for boys, and Vores egen Irene (Our Own Irene, 1976). Here she also brings up the problems faced by women in the 1970s.

She is remembered in particular for Dansen med Regitze (The Dance with Regitze, 1987) telling the story of a married woman who valiantly approaches her death. In 1989, it was made into the award-winning film Waltzing Regitze. Her story of the problems encountered by three children who are left alone when their mother goes to prison is the subject of Når mor kommer hjem (When Mother Comes Home) which also led to a movie in 1995.

Martha Christensen died on 3 January 1995 in Faaborg on the island of Funen. She is buried in the Falsled Filial churchyard.
