= Crimes of Passion (film series) =

- International promotional poster
- Directed by: Birger Larsen; Christian Eklöw & Christopher Panov; Peter Schildt; Daniel Di Grado; Molly Hartleb
- Based on: Six novels by Maria Lang
- Produced by: Reneé Axö
- Starring: Tuva Novotny; Linus Wahlgren; Ola Rapace
- Cinematography: Mats Axby; Andres Rignell; Rolf Lindström; Jan Jonaeus; Andréas Lennartsson
- Music by: Karl & Pär Frid
- Production company: Pampas Produktion AB
- Running time: 90 minutes
- Country: Sweden
- Language: Swedish

Crimes of Passion is the English collective title for a series of six feature-length crime films released in 2013, based on six of the early novels of the prolific Swedish crime novelist Maria Lang (real name Dagmar Lange), written in the late 1940s and early 1950s. The films were co-produced by Svensk Filmindustri and Swedish commercial broadcaster TV4.

The first film was released in Swedish cinemas on 8 March 2013, and received indifferent or poor reviews from most Swedish critics. The remaining five were released on DVD in Sweden during the autumn of 2013 and were all made available on TV4's subscription video on demand service TV4 Play Premium in June 2014. In October and November 2014, the six films were shown on TV4's DTTV service.

On 11 December 2013 BBC Four announced that it had bought the British broadcasting rights to Crimes of Passion, with the series premiering on BBC Four on 30 August 2014. The films have been described as Mad Men meeting The Killing.

== Plot ==
Set mainly in Bergslagen in the 1950s, the films follow Puck Ekstedt (Tuva Novotny), her boyfriend (and later husband) Einar Bure (Linus Wahlgren), nicknamed Eje, and their friend, police superintendent Christer Wijk (Ola Rapace), as they solve various crimes.

== Main cast ==
Main cast of Crimes of Passion: Ola Rapace, Tuva Novotny and Linus Wahlgren

- Tuva Novotny as Puck Ekstedt, a literature student dating and later married to Einar.
- Linus Wahlgren as Einar Bure, called Eje, Puck's boyfriend and later husband, and Christer's best friend.
- Ola Rapace as Christer Wijk, a police superintendent living in Stockholm.

== Music ==
The title sequence theme music to the series was written and produced by artists Frid & Frid (a.k.a. brothers Karl Frid & Pär Frid), and was sung by Isabella Lundgren. Frid & Frid also contributed most of the other incidental music throughout the six film episodes.

== Production ==
The series was made by Pampas Produktion AB for Swedish television network TV4. Crimes of Passion is produced by Reneé Axö and the films are directed by Birger Larsen, Christian Eklöw, Christopher Panov, Molly Hartleb and Peter Schildt.

== Films ==
No.	Title	Directed by	Written by	Original release date
1	Death of a Loved One (Mördaren ljuger inte ensam)	Birger Larsen	Charlotte Orwin; Jonna Bolin-Cullberg	8 March 2013 (cinema)
Other actors in this film: Gustaf Hammarsten, Suzanna Dilber, Peter Viitanen, Andreas Utterhall, Ida Engvoll, Fanny Risberg and Sanna Krepper
2	King Lily of the Valley (Kung Liljekonvalje av dungen)	Christian Eklöw; Christopher Panov	Charlotte Orwin; Jonna Bolin-Cullberg	7 August 2013 (DVD)
Other actors in this film: Maya Hansson-Bergqvist, Ulric von der Esch, Ida Marianne Vassbotn Klasson, Bengt Järnblad, Irma von Platen, Maria Sid, Lena B. Eriksson, Inga Landgré, Eva Millberg, Alexander Stocks, Victor von Schirach and Fredrik Dolk
3	No More Murders (Inte flera mord)	Peter Schildt	Charlotte Orwin; Jonna Bolin-Cullberg	4 September 2013 (DVD)
Other actors in this film: Julia Sporre, Anna Wallander, Martin Eliasson, Alexandra Zetterberg, Lottie Ejebrant, Thomas Oredsson, Ylva Ekblad, Fredrik Dolk, Sara Jangfeldt, Annika Hallin, Maria Kulle and Stina Ekblad
4	Roses, Kisses and Death (Rosor, kyssar och döden)	Daniel Di Grado	Alexander Onofri; Kerstin Gezelius	9 October 2013 (DVD)
Other actors in this film: Andreas La Chenardière, Steve Kratz, Anita Wall, Måns Westfelt, Lisa Henni, Alida Morberg, Karin Bergquist, Anders Ekborg, Filip Berg, Andreas Nilsson, Happy Jankell and Philip Hughes
5	Dangerous Dreams (Farliga drömmar)	Molly Hartleb	Charlotte Orwin; Jonna Bolin-Cullberg	6 November 2013 (DVD)
Other actors in this film: Björn Andersson, Claes Ljungmark, Elisabet Sverlander, Siw Erixon, Hanna Alström, Peter Carlberg, Maria Langhammer, Joel Spira, Simon J. Berger and Vera Vitali
6	Tragedy in a Country Churchyard (Tragedi på en lantkyrkogård)	Christian Eklöw; Christopher Panov	Alex Haridi	20 November 2013 (DVD)
Other actors in this film: Katia Winter, Reuben Sallmander, Emil Almén, Liv Mjönes, Susanne Thorson, Sofia Bach, Johan H:son Kjellgren, Ella Fogelström, Anastasios Soulis, Natalie Minnevik, Sissela Kyle and Jacob Ericksson
