= Eva Gram Schjoldager =

Danish actress

- Born: 8 May 1966 (age 58); Århus, Denmark
- Occupation: Actress
- Years active: 1981–1998

Eva Gram Schjoldager (born 8 May 1966) is a Danish actress and child star. In 1981, Shjoldager received international attention for her leading role as the bullied schoolgirl, Elin, in Nils Malmros's coming-of-age drama Tree of Knowledge (Kundskabens træ). Filming for the role was performed over a two-year period, while Schjoldager was 13 to 15 years old, to realistically show her character's physical and emotional maturation. Afterward, Schjoldager appeared in only one other film: Malmros' 1983 drama Skønheden og udyret (Beauty and the Beast). She decided to leave acting after completing an education in psychology from Århus University in 1998. In 2001, she was living with her husband and children and working as a human resource manager for a software firm in Denmark.

== Filmography ==
Year	Title	Original title	Role
1981	Tree of Knowledge	Kundskabens træ	Elin
1983	Beauty and the Beast	Skønheden og udyret	Drude
