= Henri Nathansen =

Danish writer and stage director (1868–1944)

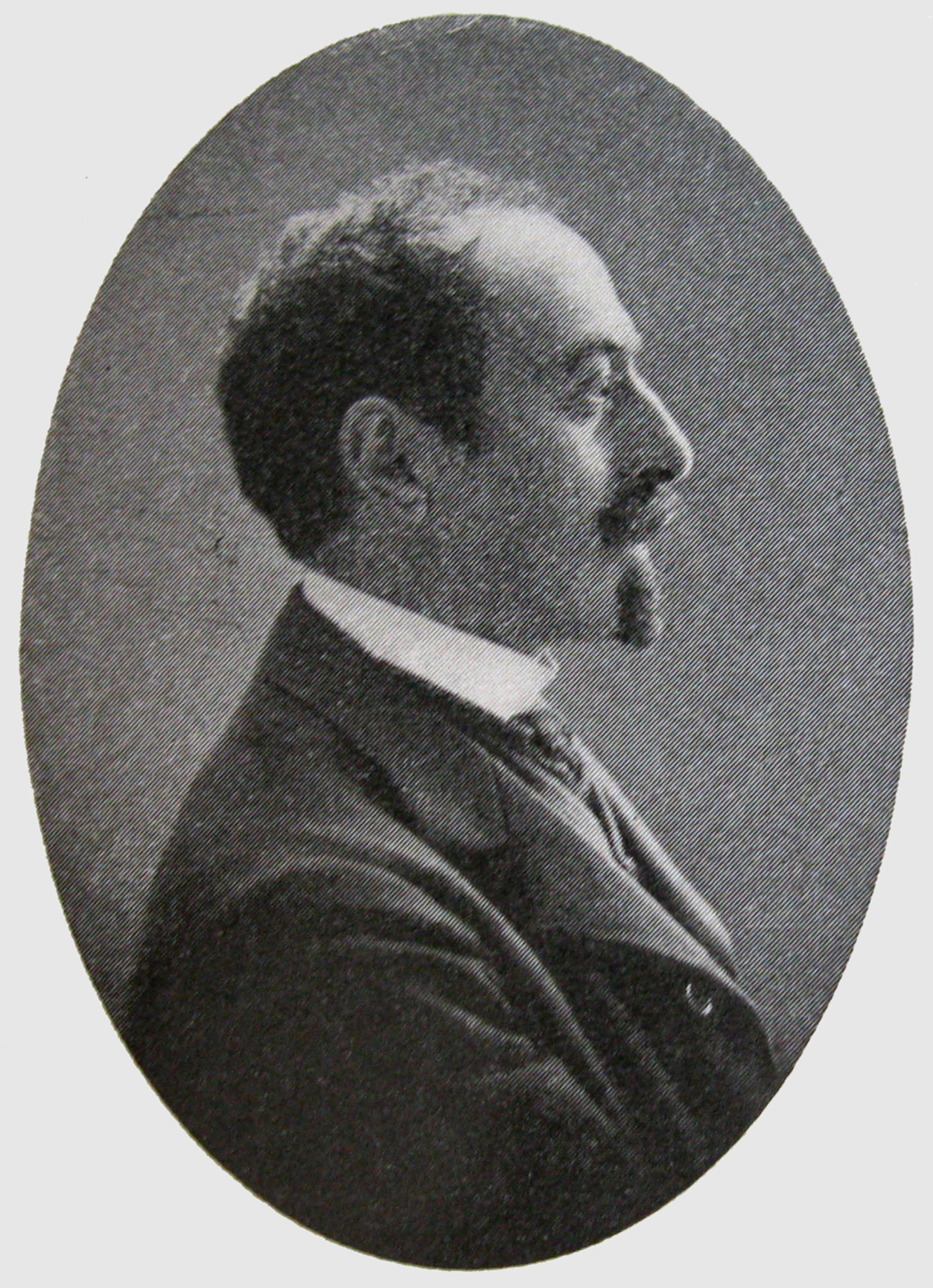
- Henri Nathansen, 1909
- Born: 17 July 1868; Hjørring, Denmark
- Died: 16 February 1944 (aged 75); Lund, Sweden
- Occupations: Novelist, dramatist, stage director, biographer
- Writing career
- Pen name: Frater Taciturnus
- Notable works: Indenfor Murene, Mendel Philipsen & Søn
- Literary movement: Naturalism

Henri Nathansen (17 July 1868 – 16 February 1944) was a Danish writer and stage director, today best known for the play Indenfor Murene (the Danish rendering of the Latin expression intra muros, meaning "within the walls").

== Biography ==
Nathansen grew up in a merchant family in Copenhagen. Abandoning a legal career, he turned to writing and later directing. His best known work, Indenfor Murene, premiered in 1912 at the Royal Danish Theatre, directed by the author. The play centers around a wealthy, loving, but conservative Jewish family whose only daughter breaks away from tradition by attending lectures at the university and secretly becoming engaged to her teacher, a gentile. Still frequently performed, the play was included in the official Canon of Danish Culture in 2006.

Nathansen's 1932 novel Mendel Philipsen & Søn, about a Jewish woman who falls in love with a gentile painter but instead enters into a loveless marriage with her Jewish cousin, was adapted for the 1992 movie Sofie.

Late in his career, Nathansen wrote a number of biographies, notably one of Georg Brandes (1929).

In October 1943, when the Nazis attempted to round up the Danish Jews, Nathansen fled to Sweden. Four months later, he killed himself.

== Legacy ==
A bust of Nathansen stands in the small garden complex Digterlunden next to the Town Hall Square in Frederiksberg.

== Sources ==
- Sprinchorn, Evert; Cody, Gabrielle H., eds. (2007). The Columbia encyclopedia of modern drama. Vol. 2. Columbia University Press. pp. 949–950. ISBN 978-0-231-14424-7.
- Marker, Frederick J.; Marker, Lise-Lone (1996). A history of Scandinavian theatre. Cambridge University Press. p. 224. ISBN 978-0-521-39237-2.
- "Henri Nathansen". Den Store Danske Encyklopædi (in Danish).
- "Henri Nathansen" (in Danish). bibliografi.dk: International Author Biography. Archived from the original on 11 November 2007.
