= Manifesto (1988 film) =

- Theatrical release poster
- Directed by: Dušan Makavejev
- Written by: Dušan Makavejev
- Produced by: Yoram Globus; Menahem Golan
- Starring: Camilla Søeberg; Alfred Molina; Simon Callow; Lindsay Duncan; Eric Stoltz
- Production company: Cannon Group
- Distributed by: Cannon Film Distributors
- Release date: 27 January 1988 (United Kingdom)
- Country: United States
- Language: English
- Box office: $70,060

Manifesto is a 1988 American comedy drama film written and directed by Dušan Makavejev and starring Camilla Søeberg, Alfred Molina, Simon Callow and Eric Stoltz. It was filmed in what was Yugoslavia under the working title, "For a Night of Love", and is based on the novella Pour une nuit d'amour by Émile Zola. The screenplay concerns an attempt by revolutionaries to assassinate an autocratic central European monarch, and the inept police state that tries to find and stop them. Callow, who plays the character of Hunt, documented the production of the film in his 1990 book Shooting the Actor.

== Plot ==
In the 1920s, the King's security chief Avanti arrives in the sleepy village of Waldheim with an array of policemen to protect the monarch on his upcoming visit. Meanwhile, the lovely Svetlana also returns to the village after 3 years away, with plans of assassination - and romance.

== Cast ==
- Camilla Søeberg as Svetlana Vargas
- Alfred Molina as Avanti
- Simon Callow as Police Chief Hunt
- Eric Stoltz as Christopher
- Lindsay Duncan as Lily Sachor
- Rade Šerbedžija as Emile
- Svetozar Cvetković as Rudi Kugelhopf
- Chris Haywood as Wango
- Patrick Godfrey as Doctor Lombrosow
- Linda Marlowe as Stella Vargas
- Ronald Lacey as Conductor
- Tanja Bošković as Olympia
- Gabrielle Anwar as Tina
- Enver Petrovci as The King
- Zeljko Duvnjak as Martin
