= Birthe Neumann =

Danish actress (born 1947)

Birthe Neumann (born 30 April 1947) is a Danish actress.

Neumann was born in Vanløse, Copenhagen. In 1972 she graduated from the Danish National School of Theatre, and was shortly afterwards employed as an actress at the Royal Danish Theatre in Copenhagen. At the Royal Danish Theatre she has appeared in a number of productions, among them Marx and Coca Cola, Molière's The Learned Ladies, Henrik Hertz's Sparekassen (The Savings Bank), Jess Ørnsbo's Majonæse (Mayonnaise), Arthur Miller's Death of a Salesman, and David Hare's A Breath of Life.

Her film appearances include Hovedjægerne (her first film role, in 1971; released internationally as The Headhunters), Lad isbjørnene danse (1990, Dance of the Polar Bears), Kærlighedens Smerte (1992, Pain of Love), The Celebration (1998, Festen, the first Dogme 95 film), Elsker dig for evigt og (2002, Open Hearts, also a Dogme film) and Lykkevej (Move Me, 2003).

She has also appeared in Danish television series including Lars von Trier's Riget (The Kingdom), Forsvar (Defense), and as a repeated guest star on Krøniken (Chronicles).

She has received both of Denmark's leading film awards: a Bodil for her performances in Kærlighedens smerte and Lykkevej, and a Robert for Lykkevej. In 2013, she received the Lauritzen Award.

Neumann was married to Danish actor Paul Hüttel from 1974 until his death in 2025; they had one daughter.

== Filmography ==
=== Film ===
Key
†	Denotes productions that have not yet been released

Year	Title	Role	Notes
1992	Pain of Love	Kirstens mor	
1998	The Celebration	Else, the mother	
2002	Facing the Truth	Eli's Mother	
2002	Open Hearts	Hanne	
2008	Dancers	Annika's Mother	
2010	In a Better World	Marianne's colleague	
2020	Into the Darkness	Sara	
2021	The Pact	Karen Blixen	
2025	Mors drenge	Jette Dreyer	
2026	De forbandede år - Fredens pris	Sara Meyer	
2026	Three of a Kind	Vivi	

=== Television ===
Year	Title	Role	Notes
2013–2024	Badehotellet	Olga Fjeldsø	64 episodes
2022	The Shift	Vivi	
2024	Constellation	Walborg Bang	1 episode

== Awards and nominations ==
Year	Award	Category	Work	Result
1993	Bodil Award	Best Actress in a Supporting Role	Kærlighedens smerte	Won
1996	Bodil Award	Best Actress in a Supporting Role	Kun en pige	Nominated
1996	Robert Awards	Best Actress in a Supporting Role	Kun en pige	Won
1999	Robert Awards	Best Actress in a Supporting Role	The Celebration	Won
2002	Bodil Award	Best Actress in a Supporting Role	Fogsvansen	Nominated
2002	Robert Awards	Best Actress in a Supporting Role	Fogsvansen	Won
2003	Bodil Award	Best Actress in a Supporting Role	Open Hearts	Nominated
2003	Robert Awards	Best Actress in a Supporting Role	Open Hearts	Nominated
2004	Bodil Award	Best Actress in a Leading Role	Move Me	Won
2004	Robert Awards	Best Actress in a Leading Role	Move Me	Won
2006	Bodil Award	Best Actress	Solkongen	Nominated
2006	Robert Awards	Best Actress	Solkongen	Nominated
2013	Robert Awards	Best Actress in a Supporting Television Role	Julestjerner	Won
2022	Bodil Award	Best Actress	The Pact	Won
2022	Robert Awards	Best Actress	The Pact	Won
2026	Robert Awards	Best Actress in a Supporting Role	Three of a KInd	Nominated
