= Seaside Hotel =

Danish television series

- Genre: Drama, comedy
- Created by: Hanna Lundblad; Stig Thorsboe
- Written by: Hanna Lundblad; Stig Thorsboe
- Directed by: Fabian Wullenweber; Jesper W. Nielsen
- Starring: Amalie Dollerup; Lars Ranthe; Anne Louise Hassing; Jens Jacob Tychsen; Merete Mærkedahl; Ulla Vejby; Anette Støvelbæk; Birthe Neumann
- Composers: Halfdan E; Jeppe Kaas
- Country of origin: Denmark
- Original language: Danish
- No. of seasons: 10
- No. of episodes: 64

Production
- Executive producers: Hanna Lundblad; Stig Thorsboe; Pernille Bech Christensen; Lars Bjørn Hansen; Keld Reinicke; Birdie Bjerregaard; Michael Fleischer
- Producer: Michael Bille Frandsen
- Cinematography: Jacob Kusk; Dirk Brüel; Niels Reedtz Johansen
- Editors: Janne Bjerg Sørensen; Carsten Søsted; Steen Schapiro
- Running time: 50 minutes

Badehotellet (English: Seaside Hotel) is a Danish drama comedy series that has been running on TV 2 since 2013. The storyline follows the guests and employees at a seaside hotel by Skagerrak, 10 kilometres (6.2 mi) south of Skagen. The show's plot line starts in mid-1928. Seasons 1 through 5 each follow a summer hotel season in the years 1928 through 1932. Season 6 through 8 each follow a summer season in the years 1939 through 1941. Season 9, which aired in 2022, depicted the summer of 1945. Season 10, the show's last, aired in 2024 and is set in 1946–47.

From 2016 through 2020, the series was the most watched fictional series on Danish television.

As of June 2024, seasons 1–10 are available in the United States on PBS Passport.

== Main cast and characters ==
Following are the main characters in the series:

Actor	Character
Bodil Jørgensen	Molly Andersen
Rosalinde Mynster	Fie Kjær
Amalie Dollerup	Amanda Madsen/Berggren
Lars Ranthe	Georg Madsen
Anne Louise Hassing	Therese Madsen
Jens Jacob Tychsen	Edward Weyse
Cecilie Stenspil	Helene Aurland/Weyse
Peter Hesse Overgaard	Hjalmar Aurland
Mads Wille	Grev Ditmar
Sigurd le Dous	Philip Dupont
Birthe Neumann	Olga Fjeldsø
Sonja Oppenhagen	Lydia Vetterstrøm/Ploug
Anette Støvelbæk	Alice Frigh
Bjarne Henriksen	Otto Frigh
Ulla Vejby	Edith
Merete Mærkedahl	Otilia
Ena Spottag	Martha
Morten Hemmingsen	Morten Enevoldsen
