= The Empty Mirror =

- Directed by: Barry J. Hershey
- Written by: Barry J. Hershey; R. Buckingham
- Produced by: Jay Roach; David D. Johnson; William Dance
- Starring: Norman Rodway; Joel Grey; Camilla Soeberg
- Cinematography: Frederick Elmes
- Edited by: Marc Grossman
- Music by: John Frizzell
- Production company: Walden Woods Films
- Distributed by: Lions Gate Films
- Release date: November 1996
- Running time: 118 minutes
- Country: United States
- Language: English

The Empty Mirror is an experimental dramatic feature-length film using historical images and speculative fiction to study the life and mind of Adolf Hitler. The film is a psychological journey that examines the nature of evil and the dark strands of human nature. The 1996 film was premiered at the Cannes International Film Festival and was released theatrically by Lions Gate Films. The film had its cable premiere on HBO.

== Plot ==
The film is a fantastical journey through the looking-glass of history into the darkest recesses of the mind of Adolf Hitler. In a dreamlike subterranean environment removed from historical time, Adolf Hitler confronts the demons of his own psyche. As he dictates his memoirs, Hitler encounters apparitions of his confidant, Joseph Goebbels, his enigmatic mistress, Eva Braun, Hermann Göring, Sigmund Freud and the mysterious Woman in Black.

Through haunting images, Hitler's stream-of-consciousness soliloquies and exchanges with his phantom guests, The Empty Mirror presents a frightening primer on genius and psychosis, domination and destruction. The action unfolds amidst a streaming flow of archival film footage intercut with images from Leni Riefenstahl's masterpiece of Nazi propaganda, Triumph of the Will, as well as private home movies shot by Eva Braun.

== Cast ==
- Norman Rodway as Adolf Hitler
- Joel Grey as Joseph Goebbels
- Camilla Søeberg as Eva Braun
- Peter Michael Goetz as Sigmund Freud
- Doug McKeon as The Typist
- Glenn Shadix as Hermann Göring
- Hope Allen as Woman in Black
- Lori Scott as Floating Female Spirit
- Raul Kobrinsky as Jailer
- Sarah Benoit as White Nurse
- John Paul Jones as Extremely Large Man
- Alan Richards as Odd-Looking Man
- Adolf Hitler as Himself (archive footage)
- Heinrich Himmler as Himself (archive footage)
- Joseph Stalin as Himself (archive footage)

== Reception ==
Critical reaction to the film was generally favorable. Ella Taylor of The Atlantic Monthly called it an "ambitious, fascinating feature debut". David Sterritt of The Christian Science Monitor said "it conjures up a postmodern version of what composer Richard Wagner called a Gesamtkunstwerk, or 'total art work'". Ed Kelleher of Film Journal International called it "[a] vivid, unsettling… bold, demanding film…". Also impressed, The Boston Phoenix reported, "in its silent moments of visual horror, many of them enduringly haunting, The Empty Mirror transcends its ambitious erudition, becoming a work of beauty and emotional depth". On Norman Rodway as Hitler, Joe Leydon of MSNBC said, "Rodway – whose performance as Hitler is a canny balance of prideful fanaticism and anxious rationalization – is truly mesmerizing." Similarly, Peter Stack of The San Francisco Chronicle remarked, "Rodway's bellowing, sometimes pleading tour-de-force is so extraordinary that it's almost scary to watch." On a negative front, Lawrence Van Gelder of The New York Times, commented, "Adolf Hitler may have been many things, but it seems unlikely that he was the colossal bore portrayed in the hyperthyroid hodgepodge of pseudo-psychotherapy." Left unimpressed, Kevin Thomas of The Los Angeles Times mused, "There's lots of flashy visuals as punctuation, but they simply serve to underline the theatricality of this entire endeavor, which belongs on a stage, if anywhere at all."

== Awards ==
- Best Narrative Film – New England Film Festival (1997)
- Gold Award – Charleston Worldfest (1996)
- Critics' Choice – Los Angeles AFI International Film Festival (1996)
- Best Cinematography – Fantasporto Film Festival (1997)
- Best Cinematography – Houston International Film Festival (1997)
- Best First Feature – Houston International Film Festival (1997)
- Lumiere Award – New Orleans International Film Festival (1997)
- Medal of the President of the Republic of Italy – Salerno International Film Festival
- Best Feature Film – Sinking Creek Film Festival (1997)

== See also ==
- List of Holocaust films
