= Four Jacks (quartet) =

Four Jacks was a Danish vocal quartet, founded in 1956 by Poul Rudi and Otto Brandenburg. John Mogensen joined shortly afterwards, and gradually took over the creative leadership. Mogensen thought that there was a missing ingredient, and after a while Bent "Little Bent" Werther was added. Werther was more of an entertainer, and was often at the forefront. The group had its TV debut in 1957. Brandenburg left in 1958 to pursue a successful solo career and was replaced by James Rasmussen.

The group is of interest because several of Denmark's most popular singers were members. In addition to Brandenburg, Mogensen went on to become one of Denmark's most popular singers of the early 1970s, and Rasmussen later had a successful career in Hollywood before returning to Denmark in 1980. In 2005, a re-release of the group's hits reached number one in the Danish Top 40 charts. In the English-speaking world, the group is perhaps best known for their version of Oley Speaks' On the Road to Mandalay.

== Discography ==
=== LPs ===
- Four Jacks (1960)
- Vi sang dem som børn (1960)
