= Jan Weincke =

Danish cinematographer (born 1945)

- Born: 30 April 1945 (age 81); Copenhagen, Denmark
- Occupation: Cinematographer

Jan Weincke (born 30 April 1945) is a Danish cinematographer.

== Filmography ==
- Facing the Truth (2002)
- Barbara (1997)
- Inside (1996)
- Illusioner (1994)
- Pain of Love (1992)
- Penn & Teller Get Killed (1989)
- Dead of Winter (1987)
- Weeds (1987)
- Hello Again (1987)
- Twist and Shout (1984)
- Beauty and the Beast (1983)
- Zappa (1983)
- Tree of Knowledge (1981)
- That's Me, Too (1980)
