= Dance of the Polar Bears =

1990 film

- Film poster
- Directed by: Birger Larsen
- Written by: Birger Larsen
- Produced by: Bent Fabricius-Bjerre
- Starring: Anders Schoubye; Tommy Kenter; Birthe Neumann; Paul Hüttel
- Cinematography: Björn Blixt
- Edited by: Birger Møller Jensen
- Music by: Frans Bak
- Distributed by: Warner & Metronome
- Release date: 5 February 1990
- Running time: 89 minutes
- Country: Denmark
- Language: Danish

Dance of the Polar Bears (Danish: Lad isbjørnene danse) is a 1990 Danish drama film directed by Birger Larsen. The film was selected as the Danish entry for the Best Foreign Language Film at the 63rd Academy Awards, but was not accepted as a nominee.

== Cast ==
- Anders Schoubye as Lasse
- Tommy Kenter as father
- Birthe Neumann as mother
- Paul Hüttel as Hilding
- Laura Drasbæk as Lollo
- Hakim Bellmann Jacobsen as Gubbi
- Kristine Horn as Tina
- Stig Hoffmeyer as teacher

== See also ==
- List of submissions to the 63rd Academy Awards for Best Foreign Language Film
- List of Danish submissions for the Academy Award for Best Foreign Language Film
