= Per Holst =

Danish film producer and director (1939–2025)

- Born: 28 March 1939; Brønshøj, Denmark
- Died: 23 August 2025 (aged 86)
- Occupations: Film producer and director
- Years active: 1967–2025

Per Holst (28 March 1939 – 23 August 2025) was a Danish film producer and director. He has produced more than 50 films since 1967. In 1997, he was a member of the jury at the 47th Berlin International Film Festival. He died on 23 August 2025, at the age of 86.

== Filmography ==
Work	Year	Credit	Notes
De standhaftige	2015	Producer	DK/Feature
Max Embarrassing Goes to the Festival	2012	Producer	DK/Feature
Max Embarrassing 2	2011	Producer	DK/Feature
Simon and the Oaks	2011	Producer	Feature
Brotherhood	2010	Producer	DK/Feature
Simon & Malou	2009	Producer consultant	DK/Feature
Max Pinlig	2008	Producer	DK/Feature
The Black Madonna	2007	Producer	DK/Feature
Evergreen	2007	Production	DK/Short fiction
[[Jungledyret Hugo 3 – fræk, flabet og fri]]	2007	Production	DK/Feature
The Ugly Duckling and Me!	2006	Story	DK/Feature
Evil	2003	Co-producer	Feature
I Am Dina	2002	Producer	Feature
Count Axel	2001	Co-producer	DK/Feature
Monas verden	2001	Associate producer	DK/Feature
Juliane	2000	Producer	DK/Feature
Bornholms stemme	1999	Production	DK/Feature
Two penny dance	1999	Production	DK/Feature
The Man with the Tuba	1999	Executive producer	DK/Short fiction
Tsatsiki, morsan och polisen	1999	Co-producer	Feature
Klinkevals	1999	Executive producer	Feature
Janes drøm	1999	Production	TV documentary
Strisser på Samsø	1997	Producer	TV series
Det store flip	1997	Production	DK/Feature
Royal blues	1997	Production	DK/Short fiction
Let's Get Lost	1997	Producer	DK/Feature
Barbara	1997	Producer	DK/Feature
[[Jungledyret Hugo 2 – den store filmhelt]]	1996	Production	DK/Feature
Aberne og det hemmelige våben	1995	Producer	DK/Feature
All Things Fair	1995	Producer	DK/Feature
Flemming og Berit	1994	Producer	TV series
Jungledyret Hugo	1993	Producer	DK/Feature
Pain of Love	1992	Production	DK/Feature
The hideaway	1991	Production	DK/Feature
Casanova	1990	Production	DK/Feature
War of the Birds	1990	Production	DK/Feature
Sirup	1990	Production	DK/Feature
Århus by night	1989	Production	DK/Feature
Huller i suppen	1988	Production	DK/Feature
The Redtops	1988	Production	DK/Feature
Pelle the Conqueror	1987	Production	DK/Feature
Coeurs flambés	1986	Production	DK/Feature
Ophelia comes to town	1985	Production	DK/Feature
Walter og Carlo - op på fars hat	1985	Direction	DK/Feature
Drengen der forsvandt	1984	Production	DK/Feature
The Element of Crime	1984	Executive producer	DK/Feature
Twist and Shout	1984	Production	DK/Feature
Children of the future	1984	Production	DK/Documentary
Beauty and the Beast	1983	Production	DK/Feature
Zappa	1983	Production	DK/Feature
Tree of Knowledge	1981	Production	DK/Feature
The Return of Captain Klyde	1980	Direction	DK/Feature
The Baron	1978	Appearance	DK/Feature
Sacked!	1973	Direction	DK/Feature
Robin Hood	1973	Director: Danish version	Feature
Benny's Bathtub	1971	Production	DK/Short fiction
Flygtning	1963	Production	DK/Documentary

== See also ==
- Asta Film
