= Kaspar Munk =

Danish film director and screenwriter

- Born: 23 June 1971 (age 55); Taastrup, Denmark
- Occupation: Film director
- Years active: 1996–present
- Spouse: Lone Hørslev
- Children: 2

Kaspar Munk (born 23 June 1971) is a Danish film director, writer and producer, best known as the director of HBO series Kamikaze and Danish Netflix series The Rain. Munk is the recipient of five Robert Awards, which is the Danish equivalent of the Academy Awards.

== Career ==
Munk made his debut in 1996 with the short film Let's Be Friends. In 2007 he was nominated for the Robert Awards for the short film Forsvunden, which went on to win the Award for Best Children's and Youth Film at Odense International Film Festival.

His first feature film was Hold Me Tight in 2010, for which he received several Danish and international awards, including the Marc'Aurelio Award in Rome, Italy, Best Feature Film Award in Tallinn, Estonia, and two awards at the festival in Mannheim-Heidelberg, Germany.

In 2012, Munk directed and co-financed You & Me Forever, which won the Danish film prize Robert Awards for Best Children's and Youth Film, as well as a nomination at the Bodil Awards. The film received the Nordic Film Prize In 2013.

In 2015, Munk moved away from youth and children movies and started directing TV series, including the DR series Ride Upon The Storm, as well as two episodes of the Netflix series The Rain.

In 2021, Munk directed the first season of the first ever Danish-produced HBO series, Kamikaze.

== Filmography ==
=== TV Series ===
Year	Title	Credits
2022	Chosen (post-production)	Director
2021	Kamikaze	Director (8 episodes)
2020	The Rain	Director (2 episodes)
2017-2018	Herrens veje	Director (10 episodes)
2016	Bedrag	Director (2 episodes)
2015	Heartless	Director (3 episodes)
2014	Tidsresan	Director (24 episodes)
2014	Limbo	Director (10 episodes)

=== Film ===
Year	Title	Credits
2018	Wild Witch	Director
2012	You & Me Forever	Director
2010	Hold Me Tight	Director
2006	Embrace Me	Director
2005	Tiny Death	Director
2003	Kisses	Director
2003	Øje-blink	Director
2001	Passing by	Director

== Awards ==
- Kamikaze (TV series) (2021)
- Vildheks (Film) (2018)
  - (Nominated) Best Children/Youth Film, Robert Awards in 2018
  - (Nominated) Best Adapted Screenplay, Robert Awards in 2018
  - (Nominated) Michel Award, Hamburg Film Festival in 2018
- Herrens Veje (TV Series) (2018-2019)
  - (Won) Best TV Series, Robert Awards in 2019
- Heartless (TV Series) (2014)
  - (Nominated) Best Danish TV Series, Robert Awards in 2016
- Tidsrejsen (TV Series) (2014)
  - (Won) Best Short-Format TV Series, Robert Awards in 2014
- You & Me Forever (Film) (2012)
  - (Won) Best Children/Family Film, Robert Awards in 2012
  - (Nominated) Best Film, Bodil Awards in 2013
  - (Nominated) Best Film, Ole Awards in 2013
  - (Nominated) Best Feature Film for Youth, Zlín International Film Festival for Children and Youth in 2013
- Hold Me Tight (Film) (2010)
  - (Won) Best Children/Family Film, Robert Awards in 2010
  - (Nominated) New Talent Grand PIX, CPH PIX in 2010
  - (Winner) Best Feature, Mannheim-Heidelberg International Filmfestival in 2010
  - (Winner) Audience Award, Mannheim-Heidelberg International Filmfestival in 2010
  - (Winner) Emerging Talent Award, Rome Film Fest in 2010
  - (Nominated) Best Film, Zulu Awards in 2011
- Forsvunden (Short)
  - (Winner) Youth Jury Prize, Odense International Film Festival in 2008
