= Sorrow and Joy =

- Film poster
- Directed by: Nils Malmros
- Written by: Nils Malmros; John Mogensen
- Starring: Jakob Cedergren; Helle Fagralid
- Release date: 7 November 2013
- Running time: 107 minutes
- Country: Denmark
- Language: Danish

Sorrow and Joy (Danish: Sorg og glæde) is a 2013 Danish drama film directed by Nils Malmros. The autobiographical film recounts the tragic event in which Malmros' wife, suffering from bipolar disorder, killed their infant daughter with a knife. It was selected as the Danish entry for the Best Foreign Language Film at the 87th Academy Awards, but was not nominated.

== Cast ==
- Jakob Cedergren as Johannes
- Helle Fagralid as Signe
- Ida Dwinger as Else
- Kristian Halken as Laurits
- Nicolas Bro as Birkemose
- Helle Hertz as Johannes' mother
- Niels Weyde as Johannes' father
- Søren Pilmark as Lawyer

== See also ==
- List of submissions to the 87th Academy Awards for Best Foreign Language Film
- List of Danish submissions for the Academy Award for Best Foreign Language Film
