= Asta Film =

Danish film production company

Asta Film is a Danish film production company.

== History ==
Asta Film was founded in 2002 by Per Holst, who came from a position as creative director in Nordisk Film. In October 2010, producer Michael Bille Frandsen became partner for just two years, as he left the company to produce a tv-series developed during his time in Asta Film. In April 2017 Morten Holst and Pelle Folmer joined Asta Film as producers and co-owners, re-establishing the focus on fictional work in features and series.

== Filmography ==
- Jungledyret Hugo 3 – fræk, flabet og fri (2007)
- Max Pinlig (2008)
- Brotherhood (2009)
- Simon (2011)
- Max Pinlig 2 (2011)
- Max Pinlig på Roskilde – nu med mor (2012)
- De standhaftige (2015)
- What a Circus (2017)
- B.O.Y. - Bruises of Yesterday (2025)

== See also ==
- Fridthjof Film
- 1606 ApS
