= Boys (1977 film) =

1977 film

- Film poster
- Directed by: Nils Malmros
- Written by: Nils Malmros; Frederick Cryer
- Produced by: Steen Herdel; Nils Malmros
- Starring: Mads Ole Erhardsen
- Release date: 26 February 1977
- Running time: 83 minutes
- Country: Denmark
- Language: Danish

Boys (Danish: Drenge) is a 1977 Danish drama film directed by Nils Malmros. The film was selected as the Danish entry for the Best Foreign Language Film at the 50th Academy Awards, but was not accepted as a nominee.

== Cast ==
- Mads Ole Erhardsen as Ole som 5-årig
- Jesper Hede as Kresten
- Mette Marie Hede as Mette
- Lone Rode as Oles mor
- Poul Clemmensen as Oles far
- Lotte Hermann as Tanten
- Mikkel Hede as Barn
- Karen-Margrethe Nyborg as Barn
- Charlotte Winther Nielsen as Barn
- Gaute Munch as Barn
- Lars Junggren as Ole
- Inez Thomsen as Marianne
- Svend Schmidt-Nielsen as Mariannes far

== See also ==
- List of submissions to the 50th Academy Awards for Best Foreign Language Film
- List of Danish submissions for the Academy Award for Best Foreign Language Film
