= You & Me Forever =

- Film poster
- Directed by: Kaspar Munk
- Written by: Kaspar Munk
- Produced by: Anders Toft Andersen
- Starring: Julie Brochorst Andersen; Frederikke Dahl Hansen; Emilie Kruse; Benjamin Wandschneider
- Cinematography: Søren Bay
- Edited by: Marlene Billie Andreasen, Nanna Frank Møller
- Music by: Sara Savery
- Release date: September 13, 2012
- Running time: 85 minutes

You & Me Forever is 2012 Danish coming-of-age drama about friendship, jealousies, and growing up. It was directed by Kaspar Munk. It follows Munk's 2010 film, Hold Me Tight, that addresses similar coming-of-age themes.

== Plot ==
Laura and Christine are both 16 years old and best friends. A young, more cosmopolitan girl, Maria, arrives at their school. The relationship between the three takes an twist as Maria acknowledges bisexual encounters. For Laura, the new friendship upends the world she thought she knew.

== Reception ==
On the review aggregator website Rotten Tomatoes, the film holds an 83% approval rating, based on six reviews with an average rating of 6.67/10.

GamesRadar said, "this blisteringly realistic Danish coming-of-age drama is smarter than most and superbly performed – parental bust-ups, excruciating seductions and all." The London Evening Standard called it "a mostly vacant film. But very pretty." The Guardian says, "The ending is a smidge pat, but there's much to savour, especially the impressive performances of the young cast."

Autostraddle listed the film at 78 on its ranking of the 103 best lesbian films of all time.
