= Birger Larsen (director) =

Danish film director and screenwriter (1961–2016)

- Born: 22 December 1961; Hvidovre, Denmark
- Died: 26 October 2016 (aged 54); Denmark
- Occupations: Film director and screenwriter
- Notable work: Dance of the Polar Bears, Sweethearts, Crimes of Passion

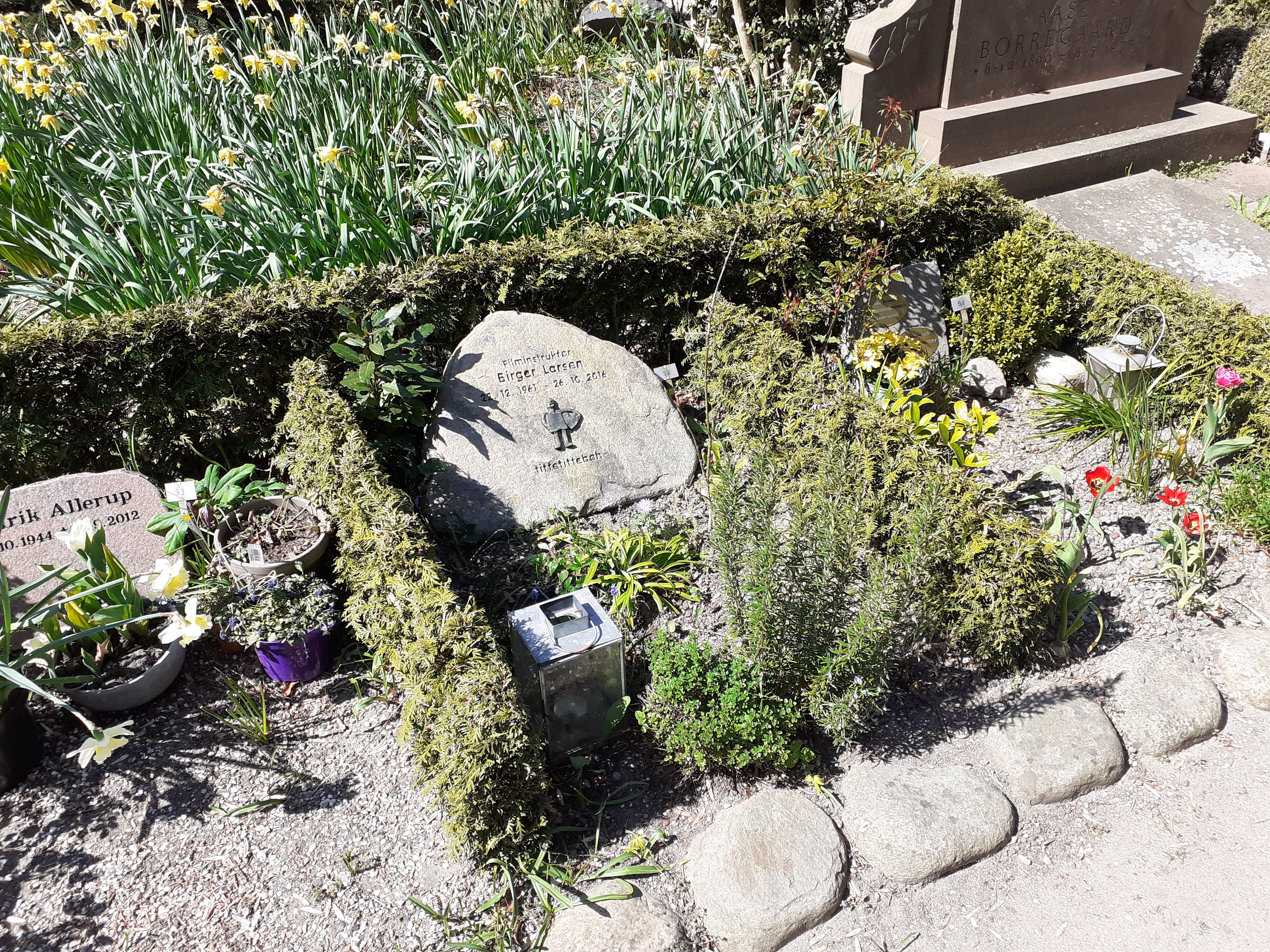
The grave of the film director Birger Larsen (1961–2016) at Holmens Kirkegård in Copenhagen.

Birger Larsen (22 December 1961 – 26 October 2016) was a Danish film director and screenwriter. He won the Bodil Award for Best Danish Film for his 1990 film Dance of the Polar Bears (Danish: Lad isbjørnene danse). He was also nominated for the Academy Award for Best Live Action Short Film for his film Sweethearts (1996). In 2013, he directed the first episode of Crimes of Passion.

== Filmography ==
Film

- Dance of the Polar Bears (1990)
- The Big Dipper (1992)
- One Step Behind (2005)
- SuperBrother (2009)
- Those Who Kill – Shadow of the Past (2012)

Short film

- Sweethearts (1996)

TV movies

- Længe leve friheden (1993)
- Murder: Joint Enterprise (2012)

TV series

- Frihedens skygge (1994)
- Taxa (1997)
- Nikolaj og Julie (2002)
- Den 5:e kvinnan (2002)
- The Killing (2007)
- Those Who Kill (2010)
- Murder (2016) (Episode "The Third Voice")

Other credits

Title	Year	Role
Wanna see my beautiful navel?	1978	Claus
Beauty and the Beast	1983	Assistant lighting technician
The Element of Crime	1984	Best boy (2o unit)
Tonny Toupé show	1985	Billardspiller med solbriller
Emma's Shadow	1988	Assistant director
Holes in the Soup	1988	Editor
Heaven and Hell	1988	2o unit director
Shower of Gold	1988	Assistant director
Love on the rails	1989	Assistant director
Eye of the Eagle	1997	2o unit director
Skagerrak	2003	2o unit director
