= Anne Louise Hassing =

Danish actress (born 1967)

Anna Louise Hassing
- Born: 17 September 1967 (age 58); Horsens, Denmark
- Occupation: Actress
- Years active: 1992–present
- Spouse: Peter Hellemann (m. 2006; div. 2017)
- Children: 1

Anne Louise Hassing (born 17 September 1967) is a Danish actress. Hassing won the Bodil Award for Best Actress for her debut film role in Pain of Love (1992) and the Bodil Award for Best Supporting Actress in The Idiots (1998). She is also known for her featured roles in the popular television series Krøniken (2004–2007) and Seaside Hotel (2013-2024).

== Career ==
Anne Louise Hassing was born in Horsens, Denmark, on 17 September 1967. Hassing's acting career is known in Denmark for its remarkable start. In 1992, Hassing made her film debut in the lead role of Nils Malmros' Pain of Love (Danish: Kærlighedens Smerte). Malmros auditioned 362 actresses before choosing Hassing to play the role of an extremely emotional character named Kirsten, a manic-depressive student having an affair with her teacher. The role earned Hassing both the Robert and the Bodil awards for Best Actress.

I recognized much of myself in the film's Kirsten. Her qualities are very much my own: cheerfulness, the variety of emotions, vulnerability, but also the many mood swings, which for me never developed into actual depression. I was also in love with a teacher in high school.

— Anne Louise Hassing, translated from Jyllands-Posten interview, 1992

Afterwards, Hassing worked for a short time as a bartender in Aarhus, Denmark. She was accepted into the Danish National School of Theater, which she attended from 1993 to 1997. Despite suffering from extreme stage fright, Hassing continued to pursue theater work. Her next notable role came five years later, after she graduated from the National School of Theater. In 1997, Hassing played the tender, uncomplicated character of Susanne in Lars Von Trier's Dogme film, The Idiots (Danish:Idioterne). Again, Hassing won a Bodil Award for her role, earning Best Supporting Actress of 1997. In an interview, Hassing spoke about working with Trier:

Everyone worked hard because Lars is incredibly demanding. He wants it real. No one can cheat. Everything must come from the heart. It is very inspiring, but one needs three-month of vacation afterward...

— Anne Louise Hassing, translated from Ekstra Bladet interview, 1998

Hassing has performed in the film adaptations of the Jane Aamund's novels Klinkevals and Juliane as well as the Danish TV series Strisser på Samsø (A Cop on Samsø) and De pokkers forældre. Hassing again received critical acclaim for her featured role as Ida in the popular Danish television drama Krøniken (English title: Better Times), for which she was awarded the Best Actress award in 2004, 2005, and 2006 at the annual Danish television awards, TvFestival.

In 2013, She appeared in the Academy Award - nominated film The Hunt for which she was nominated a third time for the Bodil Award for Best Supporting Actress. From 2013 to 2024, Hassing was featured in the role of Therese Madsen in the hit television series Seaside Hotel.

Hassing published Balance midt i livet in 2024 which was a humorous memoir and personal advice book about her experiences with menopause.

== Personal life ==
Hassing married the Danish musician Peter Hellemann in 2006 after they had been a couple since 2001 and had a son in 2005. They divorced in 2017.

Hassing lives in Amager, Copenhagen. She practices Nichiren Buddhism with the Buddhist association Soka Gakkai International and credits the practice for relaxing her and relieving anxieties about her career and life.

== Selected filmography ==
Year	Title	Role	Notes
2013–2024	Seaside Hotel	Therese Madsen	Television series
2014	Kapgang	Helle Friis	
2012	The Hunt	Agnes	Nominated Bodil Award - Best Supporting Actress; Nominated Robert Award - Best Supporting Actress
2011	Goltzius and the Pelican Company	Susannah	
2010	A Family	Sanne Rheinwald	Nominated Bodil Award - Best Supporting Actress; Nominated Robert Award - Best Supporting Actress
2004–2007	*Krøniken (22 episodes)	Ida Norregard	Television series
2006	Far til fire	Bibliotikar	
2000	Juliane	Madame Birk	
1999	Klinkevals	Madame Birk	
1998	The Idiots	Susanne	Nominated Bodil Award - Best Supporting Actress
1992	Pain of Love	Kirsten	Won Bodil Award - Best Actress; Won Robert Award - Best Actress
