= Kaspar Rostrup =

Danish film director (1940–2025)

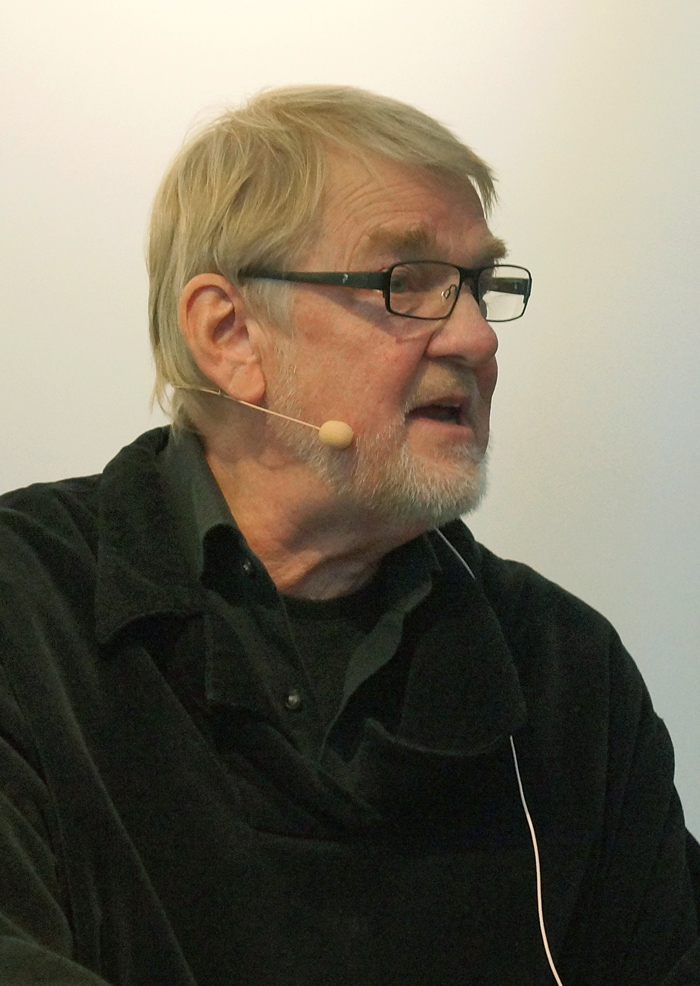
- Rostrup in 2012
- Born: 27 April 1940; Frederiksberg, Denmark
- Died: 10 November 2025 (aged 85)
- Occupations: Film director, screenwriter
- Years active: 1968–2025

Kaspar Rostrup (27 April 1940 – 10 November 2025) was a Danish film director. Two of his films won the Best Film prize at the Bodil Awards : Jeppe på bjerget (1981) and Waltzing Regitze (1989). The latter was also nominated for the Academy Award for Best Foreign Language Film. Jeppe på bjerget was entered into the 12th Moscow International Film Festival.

== Life and career ==
Rostrup was trained as an actor at the Royal Danish Theatre’s Drama School and the Aarhus Theatre Drama School in 1966. After completing his education, he was the artistic director of the experimental theatre Vestergade 58 in Aarhus until 1968. In the early 1970s, he directed several television series and plays. In 1981, he made his film directorial debut with Jeppe på bjerget. In 1984, he became director of Gladsaxe Theatre, where he created the concept of “total theatre”. In 1992, he was attached to Nordisk Film.

It was as the director of Dansen med Regitze from 1989 and the television series Bryggeren in 1996 that Rostrup truly achieved widespread popular success. Dansen med Regitze won the Bodil Award for Best Danish Film and the Robert Award for Danish Film of the Year in 1989, as well as an Oscar nomination for Best Foreign Language Film.

Rostrup died on 10 November 2025, at the age of 85.

== Selected filmography ==
- Jeppe på bjerget (1981)
- Waltzing Regitze (1989)
