= Early Spring (1986 film) =

1986 film

Early Spring (Barndommens gade)
- Directed by: Astrid Henning-Jensen
- Written by: Erik Thygesen
- Screenplay by: Astrid Henning-jensen
- Based on: Barndommens gade (The Street of Childhood); 1943 novel by Tove Ditlevsen
- Produced by: Bent Fabricius-bjerre; Tivi Magnusson
- Starring: Sofie Gråbøl
- Cinematography: Mikael Salomon
- Edited by: Ghita Beckendorff
- Music by: Anne Linnet
- Release date: 7 November 1986
- Running time: 90 minutes
- Country: Denmark
- Language: Danish

Early Spring (Danish: Barndommens gade) is a 1986 Danish drama film directed by Astrid Henning-Jensen. It was entered into the 15th Moscow International Film Festival. The film is based on the novel of the same name by Tove Ditlevsen.

== Cast ==
- Sofie Gråbøl as Ester
- Carl Quist Møller as Carl
- Vigga Bro as Ester's mother
- Torben Jensen as Ester's father
- Louise Fribo as Lisa (as Louise Fribo Eriksen)
- Kirsten Lehfeldt as Frøken Thomsen (Miss Thomsen)
- Else Petersen as Miss Thomsen's mother
- Lene Vasegaard as the teacher (Lærerinden)
- Benny Poulsen as the teacher Banana (Lærer 'bananen')
- John Hahn-Petersen as Street Policeman (Gadebetjent)
- Birgit Conradi as School Nurse (Skolesundhedsplejerske)
- Margrethe Koytu as a cleaning lady (Vaskekone)
