= That's Me, Too =

Sådan er Jeg Osse
- Poster
- Directed by: Lise Roos
- Written by: Lise Roos
- Produced by: Erik Overbye
- Cinematography: Jan Weincke
- Edited by: Edith Toreg
- Music by: Morten Kærså
- Distributed by: Focus Film
- Release date: 29 February 1980
- Running time: 103 minutes
- Country: Denmark
- Language: Danish language

Sådan er Jeg Osse or That's Me, Too is a 1980 Danish drama film directed and written by Lise Roos. It was the last film to star Inger Stender.

== Cast ==
- Stine Sylvestersen as Stine
- Avi Sagild as Stines mor
- Maria Tagliani as Stines lillesøster
- Thomas Roos as Stines lillebror
- Preben Kaas as Stines far
- Anne-Lise Gabold as Stines fars nye kone
- Eline Roos as Stines fars nye datter
- Tobias Hansen as Stines fars nye søn
- Inger Stender as Stines mormor
- Morten Krøgholt as Stines ven
- Rasmus Kærså as Stines ven
- Gitte Schödt as Stines veninde
- Sussie Egesten as Stines veninde
- Jakob Olsen as Den ene venindes fyr
- Søren Thomsen as Den voksne
- Birgit Kragh as Stines gamle lærerinde
- Kirsten Olesen as Bryggeriarbejder
- Arne Skovhus as Arbejdsformidler
- Kim Sagild as En drømmemand
- Ulrich Breuning as Madsen
