= Lars Simonsen =

Danish actor (born 1963)

- Born: 19 September 1963 (age 61); Odense, Denmark
- Occupation: Actor

Lars Simonsen (born 19 September 1963) is a Danish actor.

He graduated from Aarhus Teater in 1990. In theatre roles, he has appeared at Odense Teater, Rialto Teatret, Gladsaxe Teater, Husets Teater and Betty Nansen Teatret, among others.

Plays he has worked on include Snart kommer tiden, Den gerrige, Hagbard og Signe, Maskerade, Pinocchios aske, Helligtrekongers aften and Primadonnaer på prøve.

Lars Simonsen won the Robert Prize for best actor in 1985 and 1998 for the films Tro, håb og kærlighed and Barbara. He won the award for Best Actor at the 14th Moscow International Film Festival for his role in Twist and Shout.

From TV, he is best known from the series Landsbyen, but he has also had a role in Mordkommisjonen.

== Filmography ==
=== Films ===
Year	Title	Role
1984	Tro, håb og kærlighed	Erik
1985	Den kroniske Uskyld	
1985	Når engle elsker	Mortensens Sønn
1987	Pelle Erobreren	Niels Køller
1991	De Nøgne træer	Kjeld
1996	Tøsepiger	Michael
1996	Bella, min Bella	Bellas far
1997	Barbara	Poul Aggersoee
1999	Manden som ikke ville dø	Adrian Palmberg
1999	Klinkevals	Simon Berggren
2001	Gem et smil, Katrine	
2003	Livsforsikringen	O.P. Vademand

=== Television ===
Year	Title	Role
1985	Jane Horney	Jonas
1991	Landsbyen	Thomas
1992	Mørklægning	Lydmand
2001	Skjulte spor	Carsten Hansen
2001	Mit liv som Bent	Frank Lands
2002	Mordkommisjonen	Flemming, Faren
2003	Afgrunden	Grigori Chmara
2003	Forsvar	Professor Estrup
2007	Forbrydelsen	Peter Lassen
2011–13	The Bridge	
2016	Bedrag	Ulrik
2018	The Rain	Dr. Frederik Andersen
