= Sofie (film) =

1992 film

- Film poster
- Directed by: Liv Ullmann
- Screenplay by: Peter Poulsen; Liv Ullmann
- Based on: Mendel Philipsen and Son by Henri Nathansen
- Produced by: Lars Kolvig
- Starring: Karen-Lise Mynster; Ghita Nørby
- Cinematography: Jörgen Persson
- Edited by: Grete Møldrup
- Production company: Nordisk Film
- Distributed by: Pathé-Nordisk
- Release date: 25 September 1992
- Running time: 151 minutes
- Country: Denmark
- Language: Danish

Sofie is a 1992 Danish drama film based on the novel Mendel Philipsen and Son by Henri Nathansen. It was Denmark's submission for the 1992 Academy Award for Best Foreign Film.

== Cast ==
- Karen-Lise Mynster - Sofie
- Ghita Nørby - Frederikke
- Erland Josephson - Sofie's Father
- Jesper Christensen - Hojby
- Torben Zeller - Jonas
- Henning Moritzen - Frederick Philipson

== See also ==
- List of submissions to the 65th Academy Awards for Best Foreign Language Film
- List of Danish submissions for the Academy Award for Best Foreign Language Film
