= Jungledyret Hugo =

Danish media franchise

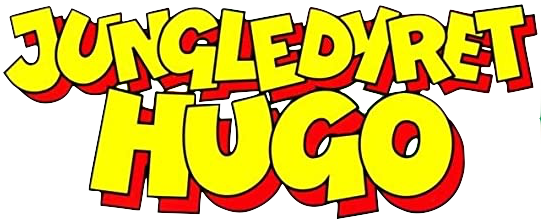
- Logo of the franchise
- Created by: Flemming Quist Møller
- Original work: Jungledyret (1993)
- Owner: Egmont Group
- Years: 1993–2007

Films and television
- Film(s): Jungledyret (1993); Jungledyret Hugo 2 – den store filmhelt (1996); Jungledyret Hugo 3 – fræk, flabet og fri (2007)
- Television series: Jungledyret Hugo (2002–2003)

Games
- Video game(s): Jungledyret Hugo (1995)

Jungledyret Hugo (Danish for "Hugo the Jungle Animal") is a Danish media franchise created by Flemming Quist Møller based on a lullaby he wrote for his son, and was later turned into a full-length animated feature, produced at A. Film. The franchise currently consists of two traditionally animated features, an animated television series, books, music album, and a third film animated in CGI.

The first two films were translated, edited, and released in the United States on a single DVD in 1998 by Miramax Family. The first film was released as Go Hugo Go and the second film was released as Hugo the Movie Star. The third film was released on region 1 DVD on August 12, 2014 under the title "Amazon Jack". A CD-ROM side-scrolling platform game for the PC based on the first film was also made in 1995 and released in Scandinavia.

== Characters ==
Danish stamp of 2002 with the main characters Hugo and Rita from the film.

In the Jungledyret series, many animals talk to each other, but humans cannot understand them.

- Hugo

Hugo is the only known surviving member of the koala-like species of Hugus primiticus. He is bipedal, though he can run in an awkwardly quadrupedal manner for speed. He can use tools such as levers and skateboards, and can outwit the vast majority of the human beings and other animals, such as snakes, cats, pigs, squirrels and even foxes. He is noted for his sly personality, his childish selfishness, his gluttony and his smugness. He eats mostly fruits and loves bananas (though he is omnivorous, as he won't shy away from eating meatballs). His most feared predator of all is, of course, humanity (with the exception of Meatball Charlie).

Hugo was voiced by Jesper Klein in the original Danish release, his singing voice was provided by Mek Pek and Bronson Pinchot in the Miramax dub.

- Rita

Rita is a young red fox who befriends Hugo on the streets of Copenhagen. She is kind, streetwise, spunky, and has a decent amount of common sense, unlike Hugo, who is rather impulsive. She lived with her mother and her two little brothers and one little sister in a den near some railroad tracks, until the second film, where she gets dragged along for the ride by Hugo, who was escaping from Cupmann and his henchmen. Her father is never mentioned. A romance between Hugo and Rita is hinted in the first film and later made sexually suggestive in the second one, but the animated series and third film later minimized this element to the point where it was only mentioned on a few occasions.

Rita was voiced by Kaya Brüel in Danish and Holly Gauthier-Frankel in the Miramax dub.

- Meatball Charlie

Charlie is the cook aboard the cargo ship that transports Hugo to Copenhagen. He finds Hugo, who has escaped the cargo hold, and at the end of the voyage, donates him to the city zoo. He appears toward the end of the first film, and is not present in the second. In the animated series, he appears once again, helping Hugo and Rita on numerous occasions, and in the third film, he makes several appearances, nearly coming off as part of the main character cast. Hugo mentions that Meatball Charlie is probably his and Rita's only "human" friend.

In the original Danish production, Meatball Charlie is named Dellekaj (a mixture of "Delle" which is slang for "frikadelle", a kind of meatball and "Kaj" which is a common Danish name) and was voiced by Jesper Klein who also voices Hugo, and Marcel Jeannin in the Miramax dub.

- Conrad Cupmann

Conrad owns a film studio in Copenhagen, and dreams of making much money. He is morally bankrupt, willing to slash and burn the jungle to capture Hugo. His first relationship started off with Izabella Dehavalot, but he rejected her wishes and left her when Hugo manages to escape Copenhagen in the first film. His second relationship is with Barbie Turner, but instead, he is rejected by her, since she did not want him hurting Hugo. He is voiced by Flemming Quist Møller in Danish and Mark Camacho in the Miramax dub.

- Generalissimo Maximillion Maximus

Generalissimo Maximillion Maximus, better known as General Maximus, is one of the series' most recurrent major antagonists. He is the wicked ruler of the recently founded fictional nation Junglandia, the country from where Hugo originates. The symbol of Junglandia is General Maximus' coat of arms, which depicts the same species as Hugo and, since Hugo is the rarest animal in the world, General Maximus is always seeking Hugo, both to have him as a symbol of the nation and in order to gain a world-famous reputation. He has a low moral set, promising a great reward to the ones who gets Hugo, but he will not always keep his promises, either cheating them, or will later break his promises, and displays a ruthless determination in order to capture him.

- Doctor Loongkoffer

Loongkoffer is an animal psychologist hired by Conrad in Jungledyret 2 to tame Hugo, but he fails in his endeavor. In Jungledyret 3, he has turned over a new leaf and wishes to keep Hugo safe. He is disgusted by Professor Strix's idea of cloning Hugo, fearing that Hugo would die in the experiments. He was voiced by Arthur Grosser in the Miramax dub. In the original Danish TV series and third film, his name is Dr. Donald Sturmdrang.

- Professor Strix

Professor Strix is a mad scientist who appears in the last two episodes of the animated series. He is one of two scientists who believe Hugo is an unknown arctic animal. He runs a professional research facility. In the third film, he makes a comeback and tries to eradicate Hugo, make multiple copies of Hugo and sell them all around the world. He is heartless, as he is willing to kill Hugo in an effort to make clones of him. In the TV series and third film, his name is Strict.

- Sharpclaw

A villainous black panther who appears in the TV series and third film.

- Pedro

He is the bodyguard of General Maximus from TV series and third film.

=== Films ===
- Izabella Dehavalot

Izabella is a black-haired starlet with a sharp figure. She is also the ex-wife of Conrad Cupmann. Her goal is to gain notoriety through the exploitation of an animal co-star; she cites several fictional actors, and then her "good friend Michael" and his chimp. Upon the discovery of Hugo, Izabella brightens at the idea of using him as her co-star and stops at nothing to capture him. Conrad divorced her in the time span between the two films, after she becomes obsessed to the point of madness over capturing Hugo. In all European versions, she is called Izabella Scorpio. She was voiced by Jytte Abildstrøm in Danish and Susan Glover in the Miramax dub.

- Rita's Mother

Rita's mother is a city fox living in Copenhagen. Rita first mentions her to Hugo during their encounter at the zoo, explaining that she hunts food for the family during the night, although it seems she rarely finds enough, as Rita says she is always hungry. Rita describes her as "real tough" and implies she has regularly fought and killed the city's stray cats. The hunt leaves her exhausted, and she spends most of the daytime in the den. She strongly disapproves of Rita's nighttime adventures, but can do little to dissuade her. Experienced but somewhat cold, she initially refuses to harbor Hugo when Rita brings him home, stating that the den is already crowded, but Rita's pleading leads her to relent, and she lets him stay for the day. She catches the two before they set off for the banana ship that evening, offering to take Hugo to the docks herself and ordering Rita to stay and look after her siblings. As they enter the industrial park they are pursued by one of the bounty hunters; fearing for her own safety, she abandons Hugo before they reach the harbor, giving him vague directions before fleeing the area. Rita's mother makes two brief appearances in Jungledyret 2. She doubts Hugo will ever return to Copenhagen and tells Rita to forget about him, while she goes out to hunt for food. She is not referenced in later media. She was voiced by Helle Ryslinge in Danish and Sonja Ball in Miramax dub.

- Barbie Turner

Barbie is a stereotypical dumb blonde and, in the second film, is Cupmann Studio's new starlet. It is also implied that she is Conrad's lover. She often chews bubble gum, even on the sound stage. In the original version of the film, her name is Sensuella. She was voiced by Louise Fribo in the Danish dub and Jennifer Seguin in the Miramax dub.

- The Jungle Dog

The Jungle Dog is a small bush dog that Hugo and Rita encounter in the third film. Rita discovers the pup when she hides in a hollow log near the Jungle Dog's nest area. The pup mistakes Rita for its mother, and Rita (presuming the pup was abandoned by its real mother) takes it under her wing. Before the film's release, some fans mistook the pup to be Hugo and Rita's child.

=== Television series ===
- Carlton and Heath

Carlton and Heath are the two reporters to catch Hugo and Rita.

- Gangsters

A quartet of gangsters, whose names are Bonnie, Sonny, Tonny, and Johnny.

- Ramon and Jeff

They are two hunters from the jungle who keep trying to catch Hugo.

- Oleta the Otter

A female otter who appears in the TV series.

- Carla

She is a sister of Meatball Charlie from TV series.

- Wilhelm Croesus

He is a wealthy man, grandfather of Georgia Croesus.

=== Books ===
- Funny Bonito

He is the leader of the gangsters.

- Ronny

He is the gangster and the twin of Tonny.

- Mikkel

He is a Mountain fox from I nordLysets Land.

== Different languages ==
The original films are known in various locals under different translated names:

- Jungledyret Hugo in Denmark
- Jungeldyret in Norway
- Jungle Jack in France, Netherlands, Czech Republic and other countries
- Skógardýrið Húgó in Iceland
- おいらフーゴだ (Oira Fūgoda) in Japan
- Jack Iz Džungle in Serbia
- Jura Iz Džungle in Croatia
- Dzhungliloom Hugo in Estonia
- Milý Jack in Slovakia
- Viidakkovekara Juuso in Finland
- Hugo das Dschungeltier in Germany
- Dzsungel Jack in Hungary
- Hugo ή Ζούνκλα τον Ζον (Hugo i Zoúnkla ton Zóon) in Greece
- Djungeldjuret Hugo in Sweden
- Szalony Jack in Poland
- La grande avventura di Jungle Jack in Italy
- Jack, Rey del Amazonas in Spain and Mexico
- Hugo, o tesouro da Amazônia in Brazil
- Em Directo da Selva in Portugal
- Hugo the Jungle Animal in Australia, United Kingdom and United States

== Films ==
=== Jungledyret Hugo (1993) ===
Jungledyret Hugo
- Directed by: Stefan Fjeldmark; Flemming Quist Møller
- Written by: Flemming Quist Møller
- Produced by: Per Holst; Anders Mastrup
- Starring: Jesper Klein; Kaya Brüel; Flemming Quist Møller; Søs Egelind
- Narrated by: Thomas Winding (Danish version only)
- Cinematography: Jan-Erik Sandberg
- Edited by: Henrik Carlsen
- Music by: Anders Koppel (score); Søren Kragh-Jacobsen (songs); Hans-Henrik Ley (songs)
- Production companies: A. Film A/S; Per Holst Film
- Distributed by: Egmont Group
- Release date: 10 December 1993
- Running time: 73 minutes
- Country: Denmark
- Language: Danish

A musical comedy and the first film in the series. It was the first film in Denmark to pioneer the use of CGI backgrounds and digital ink and paint software and cost around 17 million DKK to make. 150 cartoonists were signed on to work on the film for a year.

This film introduces Hugo, an apparently one-of-a-kind creature who lives in the Amazon rainforest. Youthful and carefree, Hugo is prone to playing practical jokes with the spider monkeys Zik and Zak. His idyllic lifestyle is interrupted when he is captured by the CEO of a famed movie company, Conrad Cupmann, to be co-star in a Hollywood-style film. In order to return from Copenhagen to his jungle home, he must escape with the help of a newly found friend, Rita the fox.

Miramax Films in partnership with Cinar produced an English dub of the film titled Go Hugo Go, which featured actor Bronson Pinchot as Hugo. Despite the dub having a 1998 copyright, it was not released until 2005 when it was released as straight-to-DVD with its sequel. Echo Bridge Home Entertainment, under license from Miramax, released the film on DVD separate from its sequel in 2011.

=== Jungledyret Hugo 2 – den store filmhelt (1996) ===
Jungledyret Hugo 2 – den store filmhelt
- Directed by: Stefan Fjeldmark; Flemming Quist Møller; Jørgen Lerdam
- Written by: Flemming Quist Møller
- Produced by: Per Holst; Anders Mastrup; Anne Ingvar; Egil Ødegård (co-producer)
- Starring: Jesper Klein; Kaya Brüel; Flemming Quist Møller; Søs Egelind
- Edited by: Hans Perk
- Music by: Anders Koppel (score and songs)
- Production companies: A. Film A/S; Per Holst Film
- Distributed by: Nordisk Film
- Release date: 25 December 1996
- Running time: 72 minutes
- Country: Denmark
- Language: Danish

The second film is still a musical, but more of a drama than the first film, with themes of friendship and loyalty.

The sequel picks up where the first film left off. Hugo and Rita each tell their friends about how much they miss one another. Meanwhile, the CEO of the film studio still wants to catch him. His plan is to have Hugo co-star in a film, and then earn much money through merchandising.

The English version titled this film Hugo the Movie Star (or Hugo 2: The Movie Star), an almost literal translation of the Danish title. A montage of the first film was put during Rita's song at the beginning of the film. Two TV networks, TV2, in Denmark, and YLE in Finland, collaborated to make this film. Unlike the 1st film which was done with traditional ink and painted cels, Jungledyret 2 was digitally inked and painted using Toonz with some of the CGI elements being created in Softimage. The film cost $25 million DKK to make.

=== Jungledyret Hugo 3 – fræk, flabet og fri (2007) ===
Jungledyret Hugo 3 – fræk, flabet og fri
- Directed by: Flemming Quist Møller; Jørgen Lerdam
- Written by: Flemming Quist Møller
- Produced by: Per Holst; Irene Sparre Hjorthøj; Kristina Holst (co-producer)
- Starring: Jesper Klein; Kaya Brüel; Flemming Quist Møller; Søs Egelind
- Music by: Trond Bjerknæs (score); Jesper Mechlenburg (songs); Jason Luke (songs)
- Production companies: A. Film A/S; Per Holst Film; Asta Film ApS
- Distributed by: Egmont Group
- Release date: 21 December 2007
- Running time: 75 minutes
- Country: Denmark
- Language: Danish

The third film continues from the 2002 animated series, which in turn was a sequel to the second film. It is a CGI film. The plot again involves Hugo being captured, this time by several competing groups of humans, who are all after Hugo for their own reasons. It was co-produced at Asta Film, Nordisk Film, and A. Film's facilities in Latvia. The film was made on a budget of €3,400,000. It was later released in the United States by Phase 4 Films in 2014 under the title Amazon Jack.
