= Camilla Søeberg =

Danish actress (born 1966)

Camilla Søeberg (born 9 June 1966) is a Danish actress.

== Selected filmography ==
- Twist and Shout (1984)
- Manifesto (1988)
- Erotique (1994)
- The Empty Mirror (1996)
- Sekten (1997)
- Mouse Hunt (1997)
- The Reunion (2011)
