= Paul Hüttel =

Danish actor (1935–2025)

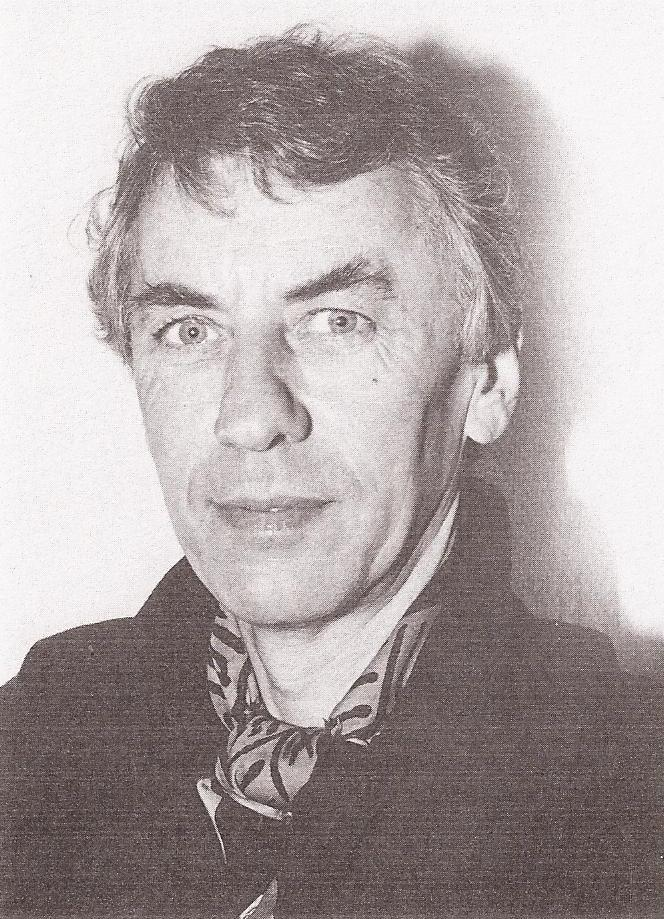
- Hüttel in 1988
- Born: 13 July 1935; Hedensted, Denmark
- Died: 24 October 2025 (aged 90)
- Occupation: Actor
- Years active: 1960–2025

Paul Hüttel (13 July 1935 – 24 October 2025) was a Danish actor. He appeared in over 50 films and television shows since 1960. Hüttel starred in the 1969 film Ballad of Carl-Henning, which was entered into the 19th Berlin International Film Festival. He was married to Danish actress Birthe Neumann; they have one daughter. Hüttel died on 24 October 2025, at the age of 90, and is buried at Holmen Cemetery in Copenhagen.

== Selected filmography ==
- Ballad of Carl-Henning (1969)
- The Olsen Gang in a Fix (1969)
- Amour (1970)
- 19 Red Roses (1974)
- Matador (1978–1982) - Herbert Schmidt
- Katinka (1988)
- Dance of the Polar Bears (1990)
