= Zappa (1983 film) =

1983 film

- Film poster
- Directed by: Bille August
- Written by: Bille August; Bjarne Reuter
- Produced by: Per Holst
- Starring: Adam Tønsberg
- Cinematography: Jan Weincke
- Edited by: Janus Billeskov Jansen
- Distributed by: Kærne Film
- Release date: 4 March 1983
- Running time: 103 minutes
- Country: Denmark
- Language: Danish

Zappa is a 1983 Danish coming-of-age drama film directed by Bille August. It was screened in the Un Certain Regard section at the 1983 Cannes Film Festival and was entered into the 13th Moscow International Film Festival. The film was also selected as the Danish entry for the Best Foreign Language Film at the 56th Academy Awards, but was not accepted as a nominee.

Zappa was adapted for the screen from the novel by the same name by Bjarne Reuter. It is the first of a trilogy, followed by Når snerlen blomstrer and Vi der valgte mælkevejen. The sequel Når snerlen blomstrer was also filmed by Bille August in 1984 and is known as Twist and Shout in English.

== Cast ==
- Adam Tønsberg as Bjørn
- Morten Hoff as Mulle
- Peter Reichhardt as Steen
- Lone Lindorff as Bjørn's mother
- Arne Hansen as Bjørn's father
- Thomas Nielsen as Henning
- Solbjørg Højfeldt as Steen's mother
- Bent Raahauge Jørgensen as Steen's father (as Bent Raahauge)
- Inga Bjerre Bloch as Mulle's mother
- Jens Okking as Mulle's father
- Elga Olga Svendsen as Bjørn's grandmother
- Willy Jacobsen as Bjørn's Grandfather
- Ulrikke Bondo as Kirsten
- Søren Frølund as Teacher 'Kaalormen'
- Michael Shomacker as Asger

== Reception ==
The film was reviewed in The New York Times in 1984, Janet Maslin stating that "Mr. August has made Zappa a suspenseful, moving drama, with concerns that are as troubling as they are universally recognizable." Nathan Rabin reviewed Zappa for the AV Club in 2004, writing that he saw it as a "masterfully bleak coming-of-age drama" and that "the film's unnerving power comes from its realization that everyone is doomed to go through adolescence alone." DVD Talk and AllMovie also reviewed, with the former commenting that it was "a pretty intense piece or work" and superior to its sequel.

In a review for Positif, François Ramasse praised the film's intelligence and its shift from gentleness to violence.

== See also ==
- List of Danish submissions for the Academy Award for Best Foreign Language Film
- List of submissions to the 56th Academy Awards for Best Foreign Language Film
