= Gunner Møller Pedersen =

Danish composer (born 1943)

Gunner Møller Pedersen (born 1943) is a Danish composer. Pedersen is best noted for composing the scores to nine of the films of Danish director Nils Malmros including Beauty and the Beast (Skønheden og udyret) in 1983 and Pain of Love (Kærlighedens Smerte) 1992. He also scored Jørgen Leth's 1976 documentary A Sunday in Hell about the French bicycle race Paris–Roubaix.

== Opera ==
Die Rättin - Rottesken (1997) opera based on the novel by Günter Grass
