= Hold Me Tight (2010 film) =

2010 Danish drama film

- Film poster
- Danish: Hold om mig
- Directed by: Kaspar Munk
- Screenplay by: Jannik Tai Mosholt
- Produced by: Anders Toft Andersen
- Starring: Julie Brochorst Andersen; Frederik Christian Johansen
- Cinematography: David Katznelson
- Edited by: Ida Bregninge; Nanna Frank Møller
- Music by: Mikael Simpson
- Production company: Nimbus Film
- Release date: 2 September 2010
- Running time: 80 minutes
- Country: Denmark
- Language: Danish

Hold Me Tight (Danish: Hold om mig) is a 2010 Danish drama film directed by Kaspar Munk. It was the director's first film.

== Synopsis ==
Sara, Mikkel, Louise, and Hassan are four teenagers whose lives are thrown into chaos one day when a misunderstanding cascades into a series of events that will mark each one of them in their own way.

== Cast ==
- Julie Brochorst Andersen as Sara
- Frederik Christian Johansen as Mikkel
- Sofia Cukic as Louise
- Hicham Najid as Hassan
- Wili Julius Findsen as Jonas
- Charlotte Fich as Sara's mom
- Bjarne Henriksen as Mikkel's dad
- Helene Egelund as Mikkel's mom

== Reception ==
Variety said the film "is a classic example of what happens when bad scripts tackle good subjects". The film has a few powerful scenes smothered by stereotypes along with "one of the most spectacularly misconceived endings in memory".
