= Jesper Klein =

Danish actor (1944–2011)

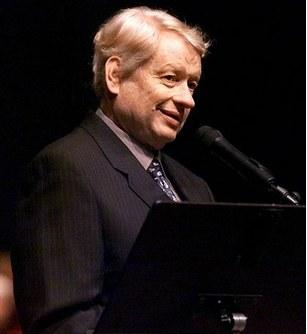
- Born: 13 November 1944; Næstved, German-occupied Denmark
- Died: 22 August 2011 (aged 66); Frederiksberg, Denmark
- Occupation: Actor
- Years active: 1968–2011
- Known for: Jungledyret Hugo
- Spouse: Lykke Nielsen (m. 1970–2006)
- Children: 2

Jesper Klein (13 November 1944 – 22 August 2011) was a Danish actor. He appeared in over 80 films and television shows since 1968. He starred in the 1969 film Ballad of Carl-Henning, which was entered into the 19th Berlin International Film Festival. Klein received the 1984 Robert Award for Best Actor in a Leading Role for his role in Nils Malmros' Beauty and the Beast.

From 1970 to 2006 he was married to Lykke Nielsen, they have a son Sebastian. Lykke died in 2006. Jesper Klein died on 22 August 2011, from cancer at the age of 66.

== Selected filmography ==
- Det kære legetøj (1968)
- Ballad of Carl-Henning (1969)
- Tough Guys of the Prairie (1970)
- Benny's Bathtub (1971)
- Gold for the Tough Guys of the Prairie (1971)
- Sunny Beach Revolution (1971)
- Prince Piwi (1974)
- Trællene (1978)
- Beauty and the Beast (1983)
- The Man Who Wanted to Be Guilty (1990)
- The Great Day on the Beach (1991)
- Jungledyret Hugo (1993)
- Frække Frida og de frygtløse spioner (1994)
- Jungledyret Hugo 2 – den store filmhelt (1996)
- Circleen: City Mouse (1998)
- A Tale of Two Mozzies (2007)
- Jungledyret Hugo 3 - fræk, flabet og fri (2007)

== Staff filmography ==
- Farlig sommer (1969) – Music Composer
- Vinterbyøster (1973) – Writer
- Jullerup Færgeby (1974) – Writer
- Ungdomsredaktionen (1975) – Writer
- Kaptajn Klyde og hans venner vender tilbage (1980) – Writer, director
- Eldorado for dyr (1985) – Writer
- Valhalla (1986) – Voice Director
