= Pain of Love =

- Front cover of the Danish DVD box
- Kærlighedens smerte
- Directed by: Nils Malmros
- Written by: Nils Malmros; John Morgensen
- Produced by: Per Holst
- Starring: Anne Louise Hassing; Søren Østergaard; Birthe Neumann; Waage Sandø
- Cinematography: Jan Weincke
- Edited by: Birger Møller Jensen
- Music by: Gunner Møller Pedersen
- Distributed by: Egmont Entertainment
- Release date: 30 October 1992
- Running time: 115 minutes
- Countries: Denmark; Sweden
- Language: Danish

Pain of Love (Danish: Kærlighedens smerte) is a 1992 Danish dramatic tragedy written and directed by Nils Malmros. It stars Anne Louise Hassing and Søren Østergaard in a beautiful but bitter story about a young college student whose small setbacks in school and relationships lead her toward an inexorable descent into suicidal depression.

== Cast ==
- Anne Louise Hassing ... Kirsten
- Søren Østergaard ... Søren
- Birthe Neumann ... Kirstens mor
- Waage Sandø ... Kirstens far
- Anni Bjørn ... Inge-Lise
- Peder Dahlgaard ... Anders
- Kamilla Gregersen ... Julie
- Finn Nielsen ... Lasse
- Ove Pedersen ... Psychology Examiner
- Mads-Peter Neumann ... Psychology Monitor
- Victor Marcussen ... Psychology Monitor
- Karin Flensborg ... Examiner

== Awards ==
The film won the 1993 Robert for Best Film, and became the only film in Danish cinema to sweep the Bodil Awards with wins for Best Danish Film and for all four acting categories. It was also nominated for the Golden Bear at the 43rd Berlin International Film Festival.
