= Jeppe på bjerget (1981 film) =

1981 film

- Directed by: Kaspar Rostrup
- Written by: Henning Bahs; Kaspar Rostrup; Ludvig Holberg (play)
- Produced by: Bo Christensen
- Starring: Buster Larsen; Else Benedikte Madsen; Henning Jensen
- Cinematography: Claus Loof
- Edited by: Lars Brydesen
- Music by: Erling D. Bjerno
- Production company: Nordisk Film
- Release date: 16 February 1981
- Running time: 110 minutes
- Country: Denmark
- Language: Danish

Jeppe på bjerget (English: Jeppe of the Hill) is a 1981 Danish film directed by Kaspar Rostrup. The script, written by Henning Bahs, was based on a play of the same name by Ludvig Holberg.

The film was produced by Nordisk Film and debuted on 16 February 1981. It won three Bodil Awards: Best Film, Best Actor (for Buster Larsen) and Best Supporting Actor (for Kurt Ravn). It was also entered into the 12th Moscow International Film Festival.

== Synopsis ==
A baron and his people decide to capture the poor peasant Jeppe and put him in the lord's bed to see his reaction.

== Cast ==
- Buster Larsen as Jeppe
- Else Benedikte Madsen as Nille
- Henning Jensen as Baronen
- Kurt Ravn as Erik Lakaj
- Benny Poulsen as Baronens sekretær
- Paul Barfoed Møller as Jacob Skomager
- Axel Strøbye as Ridefogeden
- Arthur Jensen as Jacobæus Lakaj
- Claus Ryskjær as Peter Kane Lakaj
- Claus Nissen as Peder Hammer Lakaj
- Benny Bjerregaard as Severin
- Jonny Eliasen as Morten Lakaj
- Frank Andersen as Jacob Lakaj
- Ole Ishøy as Baron
- Ove Verner Hansen as Baron
