= Tree of Knowledge (film) =

1981 Danish film by Nils Malmros

- Front cover of the Danish DVD for Tree of Knowledge
- Directed by: Nils Malmros
- Written by: Nils Malmros; Frederick Cryer
- Produced by: Per Holst
- Starring: Eva Gram Schjoldager; Jan Johansen; Line Arlien-Søborg
- Cinematography: Jan Weincke
- Edited by: Merete Brusendorff; Janus Billeskov Jansen
- Music by: Per Hillers Danseorkester; Saratoga Jazzband
- Distributed by: Kærne Film
- Release date: 13 November 1981
- Running time: 110 minutes
- Country: Denmark
- Language: Danish

Tree of Knowledge (Danish: Kundskabens træ) is a 1981 Danish coming-of-age drama directed by Nils Malmros. The film details the lives of 17 teenage schoolmates in 1950s Denmark. Shooting on location at the high school which he had attended, Malmros took two years to film the action, so the cast members reflected the real-life physical and emotional development of their characters.

Tree of Knowledge received two awards: the Danish Film Critics Bodil Award for Jan Weincke's cinematography, and the Audience Award at the Lübeck Nordic Film Festival. Tree of Knowledge is one of the top 100 Danish films listed by the Danish Film Institute and is one of ten films listed in the cultural canon of Denmark by the Danish Ministry of Culture.

The film was screened in the Un Certain Regard section at the 1982 Cannes Film Festival and was selected as the Danish entry for the Best Foreign Language Film at the 55th Academy Awards, but was not accepted as a nominee.

== Cast ==
| Actor | Role |
|---|---|
| Eva Gram Schjoldager | Elin |
| Jan Johansen | Niels-Ole |
| Line Arlien-Søborg | Anne-Mette |
| Marian Wendelbo | Elisabeth |
| Gitte Iben Andersen | Lene |
| Brian Theibel | Willy Bonde |
| Erno Müller | Class teacher |
| Merete Volstedlund | Anne-Mette's mother |
| Karin Flensborg | Elin's mother |
| Knud Andreasen | Elin's father |
| Lone Elliot | Maj-Britt |
| Astrid Holm Nielsen | Ina |
| Bo von der Lippe | Jørn |
| Morten Nautrup | Flemming |
| Martin Lysholm Jepsen | Helge |
| Anders Ørgård | Gert |
| Dan Rørmand Brøgger | Torkild |
| Lars Spang Kjeldsen | Søren Roland |
| Nikolaj Flensborg | Kaj |
| Hanne Sørensen | Mona |
| Anne-Mette Brinch Andersen | Gås |
| Anne-Mette Kjøller Warlo | Joan |
| Malene Darre | Loppe |
| Lars Hjort Frederiksen | Carsten |
| Karen Møller | Mrs. Andreasen |
| Jørgen Nygaard | Pastor |
| Arne Ringgaard | Dance teacher |
| Thorkild Tromholt | Pianist |
| Rikke Malmros | Gym teacher |
| Uffe Bak | Gym teacher |
| Norma Nissen | Mrs Scheel |
| Svend Schmidt-Nielsen | Park ranger |
| Per Cortes | Music teacher |
| Birgit Rafman | |
| Margit Due | |
| Christian Svendsen | |
| Jeanette Hede | |
| Jørg Bjerre Andersen | |

== Production ==
When Nils Malmros called Gitte Iben Andersen to say that she had been chosen to play Lene, she objected that there was a group nudity scene. She initially refused to play the scene for that reason but eventually agreed when Malmos remarked that all other girls had accepted the scene, without realising that he had used the same trick with them.

== Reception ==
Film Critic Roger Ebert of the Chicago Sun-Times wrote "The Tree of Knowledge is the truest and most moving film I have ever seen about the experience of puberty... a creative act of memory about exactly what it was like to be 13 in 1953."

== See also ==
- List of submissions to the 55th Academy Awards for Best Foreign Language Film
- List of Danish submissions for the Academy Award for Best Foreign Language Film
