= Beauty and the Beast (1983 film) =

- Front cover of the Danish DVD for Beauty and the Beast
- Directed by: Nils Malmros
- Written by: Nils Malmros
- Produced by: Per Holst
- Starring: Line Arlien-Søborg; Jesper Klein
- Cinematography: Jan Weincke
- Edited by: Birger Møller Jensen
- Music by: Gunner Møller Pedersen
- Distributed by: Kærne Film
- Release date: 11 November 1983
- Running time: 90 minutes
- Country: Denmark
- Language: Danish

Beauty and the Beast (Danish: Skønheden og udyret) is a 1983 Danish drama film written and directed by Nils Malmros. The film stars Line Arlien-Søborg as a sexually active 16-year-old and Jesper Klein as the father who struggles to accept his daughter's relationships with boys as well as his own jealousy. Malmros, who had worked with the young Arlien-Søborg on his coming-of-age drama, Tree of Knowledge, wrote the role of the daughter specifically for her.

== Cast ==
Actor	Role
Line Arlien-Søborg	Mette
Jesper Klein	Father
Merete Voldstedlund	Mother
Carsten Jörgensen	Jønne
Eva Gram Schjoldager	Drude
Brian Theibel	Mini
Jan Johansen	Lars
Michael Nørgaard	Jønne's friend
Lone Elliot	Søsser
Ib Tardini	Man outside bar
Hans Otto Hjort Hansen	Bouncer
Pia Bodal	Girl outside bar
Svend Schmidt-Nielsen

== Awards and nominations ==
Both Arlien-Søborg and Klein won the 1984 Bodil and Robert awards for acting. Beauty and the Beast received the 1984 Bodil Award for Best Danish Film and Robert Award for Danish Film of the Year. The film was entered into the 34th Berlin International Film Festival.
