= Aching Hearts =

2009 film

- Danish: Kærestesorger
- Directed by: Nils Malmros
- Starring: Thomas Ernst; Simone Tang
- Release date: 13 March 2009
- Running time: 117 minutes
- Country: Denmark
- Language: Danish

Aching Hearts (Danish: Kærestesorger) is a 2009 Danish drama film directed by Nils Malmros.
