= Ida Dwinger =

Danish actress (born 1957)

- Born: 6 March 1957 (age 68)
- Occupation: Actor
- Years active: 1989–present

Ida Dwinger (born 6 March 1957) is a Danish actor. She has appeared in multiple movies, television series, and stage productions since the 1980s.

== Biography ==
Dwinger grew up in a small town in Yugoslavia.

In 1981, Dwinger entered into Skuespillerskolen ved Odense Teater, an acting school in Odense, graduating three years later in 1984. She was nominated for Best Supporting Actress at the Reumert Award in 2001 for her roles at the Royal Danish Theatre and Café Teatret, appearing in Egelykke and Knivskarpe Polaroider respectively.

Dwinger received her bachelor's degree in theology, becoming a full-time student and later graduating in 2019. She has one daughter.
