= Søren Østergaard =

Danish actor (born 1957)

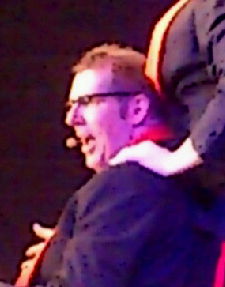
- Søren Østergaard performing in Zirkus Nemo
- Born: 11 May 1957 (age 69); Esbjerg, Denmark
- Occupation: Actor
- Years active: 1986–present

Søren Østergaard (born 11 May 1957, in Esbjerg) is a Danish film, television and stage actor.

== Selected filmography ==
- Facing the Truth (2002)
- Pain of Love (1992)

== Awards ==
- Bodil Award for Best Actor for Pain of Love (1993)
