= Twist and Shout (film) =

1984 film

- Film poster
- Directed by: Bille August
- Written by: Bjarne Reuter; Bille August
- Based on: Når snerlen blomstrer by Bjarne Reuter
- Produced by: Per Holst
- Starring: Adam Tønsberg; Lars Simonsen; Camilla Søeberg; Ulrikke Bondo
- Cinematography: Jan Weincke
- Edited by: Janus Billeskov Jansen
- Music by: Bo Holten
- Production companies: Per Holst Filmproduktion; Palle Fogtdal A/S
- Distributed by: Kærne Film
- Release date: 26 December 1984
- Running time: 107 minutes
- Country: Denmark
- Language: Danish

Twist and Shout (Danish: Tro, håb og kærlighed) is a 1984 Danish drama film directed by Bille August. It was entered into the 14th Moscow International Film Festival where Lars Simonsen won the award for Best Actor. The film saw a release in American theaters in 1986. Twist and Shout was also selected as the Danish entry for the Best Foreign Language Film at the 58th Academy Awards, but was not accepted as a nominee.

The film is adapted for the screen from the novel "Når snerlen blomstrer" by Bjarne Reuter. The story is part of a trilogy and is a sequel to the 1983 film Zappa; the story is followed by the novel "Vi der valgte mælkevejen". Twist and Shout revolves around a bunch of young people in the 1960s suburbs of Copenhagen.

== Plot ==
The plot follows two best friends, Bjørn (Adam Tønsberg) and Erik (Lars Simonsen), and their coming-of-age in 1963 Denmark against the backdrop of The Beatles becoming an overnight sensation throughout Europe. Bjørn is pursued by Kirsten (Ulrikke Bondo), who has her mind set on marriage, but Bjørn instead falls for Anna (Camilla Søeberg). The somber Erik cares for his home-bound mentally ill mother while his strict father rules his life. Erik desires Kirsten, but she's unattainable to him. Pregnancy, a horrific illegal abortion, an engagement party, and a revelation about the rectitude of Erik's father leads to a climax of events, and Bjørn and Erik must stand up to controlling adults.

== Cast ==
- Adam Tønsberg as Bjørn
- Lars Simonsen as Erik
- Camilla Søeberg as Anna
- Ulrikke Bondo as Kirsten
- Bent Mejding as Erik's father
- Aase Hansen as Erik's mother
- Arne Hansen as Bjørn's father
- Lone Lindorff as Bjørn's mother
- Thomas Nielsen as Bjørn's little brother Henning
- Malene Schwartz as Kirsten's mother
- Troels Munk as Kirsten's father
- Helle Spangaard as Kirsten's sister Inge

== Reception ==
The film has a score of 80%, based on 5 reviews, on review aggregate site Rotten Tomatoes. In a brief mixed review, Roger Ebert awarded the film two and a half stars. Critic Desson Howe noted although there was nothing particularly special about the film's plot, the on-screen charisma of the four young leads elevated the film. Janet Maslin of The New York Times gave a positive review, writing both Zappa and Twist and Shout "draw their strength from the portrait of an arid, conventional Danish society that Mr. August uses as these stories' implicit backdrop". Michael Wilmington of The Los Angeles Times also praised the film and said it gives "a realistic look at adolescent love and its harrowing consequences, a stark portrayal of the horrors of family life, and a bitter but clear-eyed look at social barriers, the dangers of compromise and the vulnerable bonds of friendship".

== See also ==
- List of submissions to the 58th Academy Awards for Best Foreign Language Film
- List of Danish submissions for the Academy Award for Best Foreign Language Film
