= John Mogensen =

Danish singer, songwriter and pianist

- Born: May 5, 1928
- Origin: Denmark
- Died: April 10, 1977 (aged 48)
- Genres: Pop, folk
- Occupations: Singer, songwriter, pianist
- Years active: 1956–1977

John Mogensen (May 5, 1928 – April 10, 1977) was a Danish singer, songwriter and pianist.

Mogensen was a member of the vocal quartet Four Jacks from 1956 to 1963. While still a member of the group, he gained popularity as a songwriter and launched a solo career in 1971. With his rough voice and frank and direct language, he formed a link between traditional pop and folk songs, alternating between direct criticism of society, simple love songs, and reflections from the pub milieu that he knew so well. Several of his songs remain popular, for example, Der er noget galt i Danmark, Så længe jeg lever, and Fut i fejemøjet.

After his early death, he became almost a cult figure to his followers. Some of his songs were re-issued and a musical based upon his life was performed for several years.

A biographical movie based on John Mogensen's life, The Way to Mandalay, was released In 2018 with Rasmus Bjerg in the leading role.

== Discography ==
- 1971: John Mogensen
- 1971: Stop En Halv
- 1973: John
- 1975: Taurus
- 1977: Nordstjernen

Post-mortem

- 1994: Der er noget galt i Danmark
- 2014: Hvad er der så mer?? - De allerbedste..
