= Nils Malmros =

Danish film director and screenwriter

- Born: Nils Sigurd Malmros; 5 October 1944 (age 81); Århus, German occupied Denmark
- Occupations: Director; Screenwriter; Doctor of Medicine
- Years active: 1968–present
- Spouse: Marianne Tromholt

Nils Malmros (born 1944), a Danish film director and screenwriter, is considered a leading auteur of realism in Danish cinema. Malmros is noted for his detailed focus on the common growing pains of adolescence and the loss of innocence, which he draws from his childhood experiences growing up in Århus, Denmark. His most notable films form a trilogy about schoolchildren in 1950s Århus: Lars-Ole 5c, Boys and Tree of Knowledge. The latter film, 1981's Tree of Knowledge (Kundskabens træ), is one of ten films listed in Denmark's cultural canon by the Danish Ministry of Culture.

Malmros, self-educated as a filmmaker, is formally trained as a surgeon. In his film Facing the Truth (At kende sandheden), he performed all of the film's brain surgery sequences himself. Malmros is a 4-time recipient of the Bodil Award for Best Danish Film and a 3-time recipient of the Robert Award for Danish Film of the Year.

== Early life and medical training ==
Nils Sigurd Malmros was born on 5 October 1944 in Århus, Denmark the son of Richard Malmros, professor of neurosurgery at University of Aarhus, and Eli Cold. As a young man, Malmros wanted to be a furniture designer and applied for admission to architecture school in Copenhagen, but was not accepted. Instead, Malmros followed in the path of his father and, in 1965, began studying medicine. However, after viewing François Truffaut's Jules and Jim and reading a film analysis by Klaus Rifbjerg, Malmros became inspired to pursue film making. Malmros eventually completed his medical training and graduated from the Århus University medical school in 1988—after 23 years and the completion of five feature films.

== First films ==
In 1968, using his own money and his friends as actors, Malmros wrote and directed his first film: A Strange Romance (En mærkelig kærlighed). The film about the problems and philosophical discussions of some youths in Århus received a premiere at a Copenhagen theater but passed with little notice. After opening in Århus, critics panned the movie for being amateurish and a plagiarism of Truffaut. Malmros was hurt, but pushed forward with his next movie project: Lars-Ole, 5c.

In 1969, Malmros sought financial support from the Danish Film Fund, first for script development of Lars-Ole, 5c, and again later for production. Both times he was turned down—the Film Fund would not support what they considered a children's movie. Malmros again self-funded his project. The movie revolved around the social life and development of a fifth-grade schoolboy. Malmros filmed on location at the Finsensgades Skole in Århus where he once attended, and he reduced costs by using children from the school as actors and extras." In 1971, he appealed for support to transfer the film from 16-mm to 35-mm and was again refused. The film premiered in 1973 to critical praise and was hailed as "a little film miracle." Malmros' treatment by the Danish Film Fund became a scandal and was discussed within the Danish parliament. Subsequently, the Film Fund was dissolved and replaced by the Danish Film Institute which awarded Malmros 335,000 dkk in settlement in 1974. In August of that year, Malmros won the Bodil Award for Best Danish Film for Lars-Ole, 5c.

== Professional career ==
The positive results and financial success of his Lars-Ole, 5c permitted Malmros to pursue his first professional film: Boys (Drenge). Once again, Malmros used his own childhood experiences to relate his story, this time about an Århus schoolboy's sexual development told in three phases from child to teenager to young man. The film premiered in 1977 and in 1978, Malmros won his second Bodil Award for Best Danish Film.

In 1981, Malmros released the third film of his trilogy: Tree of Knowledge (Kundskabens træ). Like Lars-Ole, 5c and Boys, Tree of Knowledge was an examination of Danish schoolchildren in Århus during the 1950s. However, this time, the story revolved around the lives of 17 young teenagers during a two-year period. Shooting on location at the Århus Katedralskole where he went to school, Malmros took two years to film the action, so the cast members reflected the real life physical and emotional development of their characters. Malmros originally wanted to film over a four-year period but ran into financial difficulties with the film's funding from the Det Danske Filminstitut. The film received critical acclaim but garnered only two awards: a Bodil Award for Jan Weincke's cinematography and an audience prize at the Lübeck Nordic Film Days. However, Tree of Knowledge is one of the top 100 Danish films listed by the Danish Film Institute and is one of ten films listed in the cultural canon of Denmark by the Danish Ministry of Culture.

Malmros made Beauty and the Beast (Skønheden og udyret) in 1983. The film describes the tensions between a father and daughter when he becomes jealous of his daughter's developing relationships with boys. In 1984 Malmros won his third Bodil Award for Best Danish Film. The movie was also awarded the newly established Robert Award for Danish Film of the Year. He followed this with his 1989 film Århus by Night. The film was inspired by Malmros' experiences during the filming of Boys and many of the characters were obvious portraits of those involved from the earlier film. During filming Malmros came under criticism from the Actor's union for employing amateur actors. Malmros held a preview of the movie and was criticized for the surrealistic Freudian ending by reviewers, for example critic Klaus Rifberg. However, without Rifberg's knowledge, Malmros had seen the review and one week before the official premiere he removed the film's ending, thus shortening the film by 5 minutes. Malmros received pleasant but mild reviews of the film.

In 1992, Malmros shifted from his usual milieu and made the dramatic tragedy Pain of Love (Kærlighedens Smerte). Departing from Malmros' usual sentimental view of childhood, the film tells a beautiful but bitter story about a young college student whose small setbacks in school and relationships lead her toward an inexorable descent into suicidal depression. The film won both the Bodil and Robert awards in 1993 for Best Danish Film. Both Anne Louise Hassing and Søren Østergaard received the same awards for their leading roles and both supporting actors received Bodil awards as well.

For his next film, Malmros for the first time chose a story from outside of his childhood environs. Malmros' Barbara (1997) is an adaptation of the classic Danish novel by Jørgen-Frantz Jacobsen set in the Faroe Islands. The film about a minister who falls in love and marries a promiscuous woman received the Audience Award at the Rouen Nordic Film Festival as well as the 1998 Robert Award for Best Film. For his 2002 film, Facing the Truth (At kende sandheden), Malmros returned to his personal experience with semi-biographical tale about his father who was a pioneer in brain surgery. Shot in black-and-white documentary style, the film relates the hardships of a young neurosurgeon struggling through a medical lawsuit. Malmros, intent on the film's realism, used his surgical background by performing all of the film's brain surgery scenes himself. The film was nominated for the 2003 Bodil Award for Best Danish Film and Malmros accepted the 2003 Danish Film Academy's Robert Award for Film of the Year.

In 2009, Malmros released another coming-of-age story, Aching Hearts (Kærestesorger). Filmed over a three-year period with teenagers in Viborg, the movie repeated the filming techniques and themes from Malmros' Tree of Knowledge.

In 2013, Malmros wrote and directed Sorrow and Joy (Danish: Sorg og glæde) about the tragic events in which his wife killed their 9-month-old daughter. It was selected as the Danish entry for the Best Foreign Language Film at the 87th Academy Awards, but was not nominated.

== Personal life ==
Malmros married school teacher Marianne Tromholt on 5 June 1982. Tromholt has bipolar disorder. In 1984, while on a home visit from Risskov Psychiatric Hospital and off her medication, Tromholt killed the couple's 9-month-old daughter with a kitchen knife. Tromholt received 18 months of hospital treatment after which Malmros obtained her release. Tromholt returned to teaching at the request of her students' parents. She retired from teaching in 2012, prior to the release of Malmros' 2013 film Sorrow and Joy which recounts the tragic events.

As of 2024, Nils Malmros and Marianne Tromholt had lived in their Højbjerg home for 42 years.

== Filmography ==
Year	Title	Original title	Credits	Notes
1968	A Strange Romance	En mærkelig kærlighed	Director writer Cinematographer producer editor	
1973	Lars-Ole, 5c	Lars-Ole, 5c	Director writer Actor ... Music Teacher producer editor	Bodil Award for Best Danish Film
1977	Boys	Drenge	Director writer Sound editor	Bodil Award for Best Danish Film
1978	Kammesjukjul	Kammesjukjul	Director writer	Television
1981	Tree of Knowledge	Kundskabens træ	Director writer	Listed in Denmark's Cultural Canon
1983	Beauty and the Beast	Skønheden og udyret	Director writer	Bodil Award for Best Danish Film; Robert Award for Danish Film of the Year; Entered into the 34th Berlin International Film Festival.
1989	Århus by night	Århus by night	Director writer	
1992	Pain of Love	Kærlighedens smerte	Director writer	Bodil Award for Best Danish Film; Robert Award for Danish Film of the Year; Entered into the 43rd Berlin International Film Festival.
1997	Barbara	Barbara	Director writer	Entered into the 48th Berlin International Film Festival.
2002	Facing the Truth	At kende sandheden	Director writer	
2009	Aching Hearts	Kærestesorger	Director writer	
2013	Sorrow and Joy	Sorg og glæde	Director	

== Awards ==
- Danish Film Critics Bodil Award for Best Danish Film, for Lars-Ole 5c, 1974
- Krebs' School Award, 1975
- Danish Film Critics Bodil Award for Best Danish Film, for Boys, 1977
- Preben Franks Memorial Award, 1982
- Gjest Baardsen Award, Oslo, 1982
- Audience Prize of the "Lübecker Nachrichten", Lübeck Nordic Film Days, for Tree of Knowledge, 1982
- Niels Matthiasen's Memorial Award, 1983
- Albertslunds Cultural Fond's Honorary Award, 1983
- Danish Film Academy Robert Awards for Best Film and Best Screenplay for Beauty and the Beast, 1984
- Danish Film Critics Bodil Award for Best Danish Film, for Beauty and the Beast, 1984
- Otto Rungs Authors Award, 1990
- Danish Playwrights Guild (Danske Dramatikere) Honors Award, 1993
- Danish Film Critics Bodil Award for Best Film for Pain of Love, 1993
- Danish Film Academy Robert Award for Best Film, for Pain of Love, 1993
- National Art Council's Lifetime Award, 1995
- Danish Film Academy Robert Award for Best Film, and Rouen Nordic Film Festival Audience Award, for Barbara, 1998
- Hartmann Award, 1998
