= Danish Culture Canon =

Danish curation of cultural works

The Danish Culture Canon (Danish: Kulturkanonen) consists of 108 works of cultural excellence in eight categories: architecture, visual arts, design and crafts, film, literature, music, performing arts, and children's culture. An initiative of Brian Mikkelsen in 2004, it was developed by a series of committees under the auspices of the Danish Ministry of Culture in 2006–2007 as "a collection and presentation of the greatest, most important works of Denmark's cultural heritage." Each category contains 12 works, although music contains 12 works of score music, and 12 of popular music. The literature section's 12th item is an anthology of 24 works.

== Architecture ==
The committee for architecture was asked to choose 12 works covering both buildings and landscaping. It was decided that works could either be in Denmark designed by one or more Danes or abroad designed by Danish architects. The committee consisted of: Lone Wiggers (chair), Carsten Juel-Christiansen, Malene Hauxner, Lars Juel Thiis and Kent Martinussen.

Building	Location	Year	Architect	Image
Hover Church	near Ringkøbing, Jutland	12th century	Unknown	Hover kirke
Glorup Manor	near Nyborg, Funen	12th century rebuilt 1742–1743; 1762–1765 and 1773–1775	Philip de Lange, Christian Joseph Zuber and Nicolas-Henri Jardin	Glorup herregård
Frederiksstaden	Copenhagen	1749–1771	Nicolai Eigtved	Amalienborg
Church of Our Lady	Copenhagen	1811–1829	C.F. Hansen	Vor Frue kirke
Dyrehaven	Klampenborg, Zealand	1846	Rudolph Rothe	Vesthus
Lægeforeningens boliger—Brumleby	Østerbro, Copenhagen	1854–1856	Michael Gottlieb Bindesbøll and Vilhelm Klein	Lægeforeningens boliger
Mariebjerg Cemetery	Gentofte, Zealand	1925–1935	G.N. Brandt	Mariebjerg kirkegård
Aarhus Universitet	Århus	1931	Kay Fisker, C.F. Møller, Povl Stegmann and C.Th. Sørensen	Aarhus Universitet
Aarhus City Hall	Århus	1937–1942	Arne Jacobsen and Erik Møller	Århus Rådhus
Finger Plan	Copenhagen	1947	Peter Bredsdorff	Fingerplanen
Sydney Opera House	Sydney	1957–1973	Jørn Utzon	Sydney Opera House
Great Belt East Bridge	Zealand and Funen	1991–1998	Dissing+Weitling	Storebæltsbroen

== Visual arts ==
The committee for visual arts decided that only works of artists who had completed their oeuvre could be included. They also decided that members of the committee could each select a work they especially appreciated. In this way, the committee first selected seven works whereafter five members selected one work each. The committee consisted of Hein Heinsen (chair), Hans Edvard Nørregård-Nielsen, Bente Scavenius, Bjørn Nørgaard and Sophia Kalkau.

Work	Location	Year	Artist	Image
Sun chariot	National Museum of Denmark	c. 1300 BC	Unknown	Sun chariot
The Resurrection	Undløse Church	c. 1440	Union Master	Frescoes in Undløse Church
Bordesholm Altar	Schleswig Cathedral	Completed 1521	Hans Brüggemann	Bordesholm Altar
Frederik V on Horseback	Amalienborg	Completed 1771	Jacques Saly	Statue of Frederik V
Jason with the Golden Fleece	Thorvaldsens Museum	Completed 1828	Bertel Thorvaldsen	Jason with the Golden Fleece
A View through Three of the North-Western Arches of the Third Storey of the Coliseum	Statens Museum for Kunst	1813–1816	C.W. Eckersberg	View through three of the northwesterly arches in the Colosseum's third storey
Autumn Morning on Lake Sortedam	Ny Carlsberg Glyptotek	1838	Christen Købke	Autumn Morning on Lake Sortedam
Dust Motes Dancing in Sunbeams	Ordrupgaard	1900	Vilhelm Hammershøi	Dust Motes Dancing in the Sunbeams
Summer Day by Roskilde Fjord	Randers Kunstmuseum	1900	L.A. Ring	Summer Day by Roskilde Fjord
The Great Relief	J.F. Willumsens Museum	1923–1928	J.F. Willumsen	
Standing Woman	Göteborgs konstmuseum	1937–1943	Astrid Noack	
Stalingrad	Museum Jorn, Silkeborg	1957–1972	Asger Jorn	

== Design and crafts ==
The committee for design and crafts decided that selection should be based on works with a useful function which were relevant at the time they were created while remaining recognizable today. They should also fall into an international perspective. The committee consisted of Merete Ahnfeldt-Mollerup (chair), Erik Magnussen, Astrid Krogh, Ursula Munch-Petersen and Louise Campbell.

Work	Designer	Year	Image
Viking ship Skuldelev 2	Unknown	c. 1042	Skuldelev 2
Flora Danica (book) and Flora Danica (dinner set)	Georg Christian Oeder, Johann Christoph Bayer several artists	1761–1883	Flora Danica
Thorvald Bindesbøll: life's work		1846–1908	Thorvald Bindesbøll
Knud V. Engelhardt: life's work		1882–1931	Knud V. Engelhardt
Marie Gudme Leth: life's work		1895–1997	
PH lamp shade system	Poul Henningsen	1925– still being developed	PH lamp shade system
Tea service	Gertrud Vasegaard	1956	
Gedser experimental wind turbine	Johannes Juul	1957	
Panton chair	Verner Panton	1960	
Polyurethane chair	Gunnar Aagaard Andersen	1964	
Kevi wheel	Jørgen Rasmussen	1965	Kevi wheel castor
Fiberline facade system	Fiberline Composites and Schmidt hammer lassen	2006	

== Film ==
In their selection, the committee for film focused on films reflecting Danish life with Danish actors. The included nevertheless the film Sult (Hunger) which takes place in Oslo and has Swedish actors. The committee consisted of Susanne Bier (chair), Vinca Wiedemann, Tivi Magnusson, Ole Michelsen and Jacob Neiiendam.

Work	Creator	Year	Image
Master of the House	Carl Th. Dreyer	1925	Dreyer av Mandelmann
Day of Wrath	Carl Th. Dreyer	1943	
Ditte, Child of Man	Bjarne Henning-Jensen	1946	
Jenny and the Soldier	Johan Jacobsen	1947	
Hunger	Henning Carlsen	1966	
Benny's Bathtub	Jannik Hastrup and Flemming Quist Møller	1971	
Matador	Erik Balling	1978–1982	
Tree of Knowledge	Nils Malmros	1981	
Babette's Feast	Gabriel Axel	1987	
Pelle the Conqueror	Bille August	1987	August
The Celebration	Thomas Vinterberg	1998	Vinterberg
The Idiots	Lars von Trier	1998	Trier

== Literature ==
The committee for literature found it important to select works with a quality which had been appreciated over time. The selected works were also considered to have made an important contribution both to Danish literature and to Danish culture in the widest sense. They reflect an original and bold artistic approach to works of value. They are worthy of being preserved for posterity as they serve as reference points in a modern global context. The committee consisted of Finn Hauberg Mortensen (chair), Erik A. Nielsen, Mette Winge, Claes Kastholm Hansen and Jens Christian Grøndahl.

Author	Work	Year	Image
Leonora Christina	Jammers Minde (literally Memory of Misery), translated as Memoirs of Leonora Christina	1673–1674, published 1869	Leonora
Steen Steensen Blicher	The Rector of Veilbye	1829	Blicher
Hans Christian Andersen	The Little Mermaid	1837	Hans Christian Andersen
Søren Kierkegaard	Either/Or	1843	Kierkegaard
Jens Peter Jacobsen	Fru Marie Grubbe	1876	J.P. Jacobsen
Herman Bang	Ved Vejen	1886	Bang
Henrik Pontoppidan	Lucky Per	1898–1904	Pontoppidan
Johannes V. Jensen	The Fall of the King	1900–1901	Jensen
Karen Blixen	Winter's Tales	1942	Blixen
Klaus Rifbjerg	Og andre historier (And Other Stories)	1964	Rifbjerg
Inger Christensen	Butterfly Valley	1991	Christensen

The 12th item is an Anthology of lyrics consisting of the following 24 works:

Author	Work	Year	Image
Anonymous folk song	Ebbe Skammelsøn		
Anonymous folk song	Germand Gladensvend		
Thomas Kingo	Hver har sin Skæbne (Sorrig og Glæde...)		Kingo
H. A. Brorson	Den yndigste rose er funden	1732	Brorson
Johs. Ewald	Til Siælen. En Ode	1780	Ewald
Schack von Staffeldt	Indvielsen	1804	Staffeldt
Adam Oehlenschläger	Hakon Jarls Død eller Christendommens Indførsel i Norge	1803	Oehlenschläger
N. F. S. Grundtvig	De Levendes Land	First published 1883	Grundtvig
Christian Winther	Rosa unica	1849	Winther
Emil Aarestrup	Paa Sneen	1838	Aarestrup
Holger Drachmann	Jeg hører i Natten den vuggende Lyd	1877	Drachmann
Sophus Claussen	Ekbatana	1896	Claussen
Jeppe Aakjær	Aften	1912	Aakjær
Thøger Larsen	Den danske Sommer	1914	
Tom Kristensen	Det er Knud, som er død	1936	
Jens August Schade	Læren om staten	1928	Schade
Gustaf Munch-Petersen	det underste land	1933	
Thorkild Bjørnvig	Anubis	1955	
Ole Sarvig	Regnmaaleren	1943	
Morten Nielsen	Øjeblik	1945	
Frank Jæger	Sidenius i Esbjerg	1959	
Ivan Malinowski	Myggesang	1958	
Per Højholt	Personen på toppen	1985	
Henrik Nordbrandt	Violinbyggernes by	1985	

== Music ==
The committee for music explained that, taking account of the wide range of Danish music, they gave focus to individual works rather than a composer's oeuvre. They presented two lists: one for what they called score music (classical), the other for popular music, although the two should be considered as a whole. The committee consisted of Per Erik Veng (chair), Jørgen I. Jensen, Torben Bille, Inger Sørensen and Henrik Marstal.

=== Classical music ===
Composer/author	Work	Year	Image
F.L.Æ. Kunzen	Holger Danske	1789	Kunzen
C. E. F. Weyse	Otte Morgensange and Syv Aftensange	1837 and 1838	Weyse
H. C. Lumbye	Three galops: Telegraph Galop, Champagne Galop and Copenhagen Steam Railway Galop	1844, 1845 and 1847	Lumbye
Niels W. Gade	Elverskud	1854	Gade
J. P. E. Hartmann	Vølvens Spaadom	1872	Hartmann
Peter Heise	Drot og marsk	1878	Heise
Carl Nielsen	Maskarade	1906	Nielsen
Carl Nielsen	Symphony No. 4: The Inextinguishable	1916	
Rued Langgaard	Antikrist	1923	Langgaard
Per Nørgård	Symphony No. 3	1976	
Pelle Gudmundsen-Holmgreen	Symphony-Antiphony	1978	

The 12th item titled Højskolesange (Folk High School Songs) consists of the following 12 songs:

Composer/author	Work	Year	Image
C. E. F. Weyse (1826), words: N. F. S. Grundtvig	Den signede dag med fryd vi ser	1826	
Folk song, words rewritten by Svend Grundtvig	Det var en lørdag aften	1849	Svend Grundtvig
Folk song from the Mariager area	En yndig og frydefuld sommertid	Published in A.P. Berggreen's Danske folkesange 1869	
Music: Carl Nielsen, words: Ludvig Holstein	Vi sletternes sønner	Music 1906, words 1903	
Music: Carl Nielsen, words: Jeppe Aakjær	Jens Vejmand	Music 1907, words 1905	
Music: Thomas Laub, words: St.St. Blicher	«Det er hvidt herude»	Melodi 1914, tekst 1838	
Music: Oluf Ring, words: Thøger Larsen	Danmark, nu blunder den lyse nat	Music 1922, words 1914	
Music: Poul Schierbeck, words: Hans Christian Andersen	I Danmark er jeg født	Music 1926, words 1850	
Music: Thorvald Aagaard, words: Laurits Christian Nielsen	Jeg ser de bøgelyse øer	Music 1931, words 1901	
Music: Otto Mortensen, words: Helge Rode	Du gav os de blomster, som lyste imod os	Music 1939, words 1921	
Music: Otto Mortensen, words: Alex Garff	Septembers himmel er så blå	Music and words 1949	
Music: Peter Erasmus Lange-Müller/Shu-Bi-Dua, words: Holger Drachmann	Vi elsker vort land	Music 1887 and 1980, words 1885	

=== Popular music ===
Composer/author	Work	Year	Image
Kai Normann Andersen	A selection of 12 songs: Musens sang, Den allersidste dans, Pige træd varsomt, Å hvor jeg, ih, hvor jeg, uh hvor jeg vil, I dit korte liv, Man binder os på mund og hånd, Alle går rundt og forelsker sig, Gå ud og gå en tur, Glemmer du, Titte til hinanden, Drømmeland og Gå med i lunden	1925–1959	
Dansk Guldalderjazz	Dansk Guldalderjazz Vol. 1–4	1940–1949	
Savage Rose	The Savage Rose	1968	
Kim Larsen	Værsgo	1973	Kim Larsen
Benny Andersen and Povl Dissing	Svantes Viser	1973	Dissing
Gasolin'	Live sådan	1976	
Kliché	Supertanker	1980	
C.V. Jørgensen	Tidens Tern	1980	Jørgensen
Sebastian	Stjerne til støv	1981	Sebastian
Palle Mikkelborg with Miles Davis	Aura	1984/1985	
tv·2	Nærmest lykkelig	1988	

The 12th item Evergreens is an anthology consisting of the following works:

Composer/author	Work	Year	Image
Sven Gyldmark/Poeten	Solitudevej – sung by Elga Olga Svendsen.	From Cirkusrevyen 1953	
Sven Gyldmark & Erik Leth	Er du dus med himlens fugle – sung by Poul Reichhardt.	From the film Vagabonderne på Bakkegården 1958	
Vidar Sandbeck & Peter Mynte – single	Heksedans (her kommer mutter med kost og spand) – sung by Raquel Rastenni.	1960	
Bjarne Hoyer & Ida From	To lys på et bord – sung by Otto Brandenburg	From Dansk Melodi Grand Prix, 1960	
Otto Helge Francker & Sejr Volmer-Sørensen	Dansevise – performed by Grethe Ingmann and Jørgen Ingmann.	From Dansk Melodi Grand Prix, 1963	
Bent Fabricius-Bjerre & Klaus Rifbjerg	Duerne flyver – sung by Cæsar.	From the film Jeg er sgu min egen, 1967	
John Mogensen	Så længe jeg lever – sung by John Mogensen.	Single 1970, also in the album John Mogensen: John, 1973	
Anne Linnet	Smuk og dejlig – performed by Shit & Chanel.	From the album Shit & Chanel, 1976	Linnet
Peter A. G. Nielsen/Gnags	Under Bøgen – performed by Gnags.	From the album Er du hjemme i aften, 1977	Nielsen
Shu-bi-dua	Danmark – performed by Shu-bi-dua.	From Shu-bi-dua 78'eren, 1978	
Frans Bak & Per Nielsen	Danse i måneskin – performed by Trine Dyrholm & Moonlighters.	From Dansk Melodi Grand Prix, 1987	
Lars Lilholt	Kald det kærlighed – performed by Lars Lilholt Band.	From Lars Lilholt Band: Portland, 1986	Lilholt

== Performing arts ==
The committee for performing arts explained that their selection was based on works of unique creativity representing something new for their time while still remaining meaningful today. The committee consisted of Flemming Enevold (chair), Karen-Maria Bille, Jokum Rohde, Sonja Richter and Erik Aschengreen.

Creator	Work	Year	Image
Ludvig Holberg	Jeppe på Bjerget	1722	Holberg
Adam Oehlenschläger	Aladdin	1805	Oehlenschläger
August Bournonville and Herman Severin Løvenskiold	La Sylphide	1836	Bournonville
Henri Nathansen	Indenfor Murene (Inside the Walls)	1912	Nathansen
Kaj Munk	Ordet (The Word)	1932	Munk
Kjeld Abell	Anna Sophie Hedvig	1939	
Four revue numbers:	Man binder os på mund og hånd (Liva Weel, 1940), Skolekammerater (Kellerdirk, 1956), Brevet til Bulganin (Osvald Helmuth, 1957), Fingernummeret (Dirch Passer, 1974)	1940, 1956, 1957 and 1974	
Harald Lander and Knudåge Riisager	Etudes	1948	
Flemming Flindt and Georges Delerue	Enetime	1963	
Solvognen	Julemandshæren	1974	
Sort Sol	Sort Sol live, Carlton og Wurst	1986–1987	
Jess Ørnsbo	Majonæse	1988	

== Children's canon ==
The committee was formed spontaneously as work proceeded in the other areas. It is therefore not an independent selection as suggestions were received from all the other areas.

Creator	Work	Year	Image
C.Th. Sørensen	Children's building site	1931	
Gunnar Nyborg-Jensen (ed.)	De små synger	1948	
Astrid Henning-Jensen	Palle alene i Verden (Film)	1949	
Carl Barks	The Golden Helmet	1954	Barks
Nanna Ditzel	High chair	1955	
Godtfred Kirk Christiansen	Lego brick	1958	Lego bricks
Cecil Bødker	Silas og den sorte hoppe	1967	
Halfdan Rasmussen & Ib Spang Olsen	Halfdans ABC	1967	
Katrine Hauch-Fausbøll	Kaj & Andrea	1971 ff.	
Anne Linnet	Go' sønda' morn'	1980	Linnet
Søren Kragh-Jacobsen	Gummi-Tarzan (Film)	1981	
Steen Koerner	Nøddeknækkeren	2003	

== Impact ==
According to press reports, the canon has had limited impact and has been ineffective in its stated goal of fostering integration between the Danes and the immigrant communities. Berlingske pointed out, nevertheless, that the canon will remain a milestone as a non-socialist government had dared to "simply state that some works are better than others" and assert in that "this country may well be a modern society in a globalised world but that does not mean we have no merit as a nation or no right to national pride." Erik A. Nielsen, a member of the canon's literature committee, is not surprised the literature canon has had such limited effect, faced as it is with a "tsunami of international, strongly commercial cultural interests." He points out that the only reason his students take an interest in Danish culture is that "they have to take exams in it. If they are free to choose culture themselves, they go for films, rock music and a whole lot more that is essentially English or American in origin.

== See also ==
- Swedish Culture Canon
