= Åbyskov =

- Town
- Location in the Region of Southern Denmark
- Coordinates: 55°4′11″N 10°44′2″E
- Country: Denmark
- Region: Southern Denmark
- Municipality: Svendborg

Population (2026)
  - Total: 270
- Time zone: UTC+1 (CET)
  - Summer (DST): UTC+2 (CEST)

Åbyskov is a small town located on the island of Funen in south-central Denmark, in Svendborg Municipality. It is five kilometers southeast of Skårup and 10 kilometers east of Svendborg.
