= De Levendes Land =

De Levendes Land ("Land of the Living") is a hymn written in 1824 by the Danish theologian and priest, N. F. S. Grundtvig. It is composed in a metre similar to a famous hymn, Far Verden, far vel ("Farewell, world, farewell") by Thomas Kingo but unlike its baroque model, Grundtvig's work carries a more optimistic message, expressing faith in the love and grace of God. The poem was written at a critical time in Grundtvig's life but lends voice to his belief that with God's love one can find happiness in life.

In 2006 it was named as part of the Danish Culture Canon, being one of the 24 items in the Lyrikantologi which was selected as one of the 12 works in the Literature section of the canon. The text has been translated into English by S. A. J. Bradley.
