= Crown Prince Couple's Awards =

The Crown Prince Couple's Awards (Danish: Kronprinspaarets Priser) are a set of culture and social prizes awarded annually by Crown Prince Frederik and Crown Princess Mary of Denmark. The awards were established in 2004 as a gift from the Bikuben Foundation on the occasion of the couple's marriage.

== Description ==
There are currently four awards: the Crown Prince Couple's Culture Prize and the Crown Prince Couple's Social Prize, each worth 500,000 Danish kroner and two cultural Stardust prizes of 50,000 kroner each, awarded to rising stars.

The objective of the awards is to highlight and recognize exceptional achievement in the arts and culture and in social work. The Culture Prize honours a Danish or Greenlandic artist with international potential while the Social Prize honours a groundbreaking Danish or Greenlandic project with international stature in the social sphere. The Stardust Prizes honour and highlight two young Danish or Greenlandic artists who are set to make a name.

== Recipients ==
- 2005
  - Film director Per Fly (Culture Prize)
  - Red Barnet (charitable donation)
- 2006
  - Artist Olafur Eliasson (Culture Prize)
  - Julemærkefonden (charitable donation)
- 2007
  - Actress Sonja Richter (Culture Prize)
  - Ventilen, a support organisation for lonely young people (charitable donation)
- 2008
  - Musician Tina Dickow (Culture Prize)
  - Morgencaféen for hjemløse (charitable donation)
- 2009
  - Cellist Andreas Brantelid (Culture Prize)
  - Musician Nanna Fabricius Øland and photographer Joakim Eskildsen (Stardust Prizes)
- 2010
  - Landsforeningen af væresteder (Social Prize)
  - Rådgivningscenteret og mødestedet Bagland and værestedet Amarngivat (modest social prizes)
- 2011
  - Architect Bjarke Ingels (Culture Prize)
  - Writer Josefine Klougart and the band The William Blakes (Stardust Prizes)
- 2012
  - Illustrator and writer Jakob Martin Strid (Culture Prize)
  - Ungdommens Røde Kors (Social Prize)
  - Accordionist Bjarke Mogensen and singer Nive Nielsen (Stardust Prizes)
- 2013 - The awards were presented in the Sydney Opera House on 28 October 2013
  - Artists participating in the first seasons of the television drama series Forbrydelsen and Borgen: Søren Sveistrup, main scriptwriter of Forbrydelsen, Seasons 1 to 3, Sofie Gråbøl, actress; Birger Larsen, director; Eric Kress, photographer; Niels Sejer, production designer; as well as Adam Price, main scriptwriter of Borgen 1-2, Sidse Babett Knudsen, actress; Søren Kragh-Jacobsen, director; Lasse Frank, photographer; Søren Gam, production designer (Culture Prize)
  - Voluntary organisation Natteravnene (Social Prize)
  - Violinist Rune Tonsgaard Sørensen and singer/songwriter Karen Marie Ørsted / MØ (Stardust Prizes)
- 2014 - Presented in Musikkens Hus, Aalborg, on 27 September
  - Designer Cecilie Manz (Culture Prize)
  - Support organisation TUBA (Social Prize)
  - Photographer Lærke Posselt and actress Johanne Louise Schmidt (Stardust Prizes)
- 2015
  - Amalie Smith

== See also ==
- List of European art awards
- List of awards for contributions to culture
- List of awards for contributions to society
