= Johannes Juul =

Danish engineer

- Born: 27 October 1887; Ormslev, Denmark
- Died: 5 November 1969 (aged 82); Haslev, Denmark
- Citizenship: Danish
- Known for: Development of wind turbines

Johannes Juul (27 October 1887 – 5 November 1969) was a Danish engineer who is remembered for the important part he played in the development of wind turbines. His achievements are included in the Danish Culture Canon.

== Early life ==
Born in Ormslev near Aarhus, Juul was brought up in a Grundtvigian home. He attended a free school, where physics was his favorite subject. His uncle bought him equipment for experiments. When he was 17, he became a student at Askov Højskole, a folk high school, where he was one of the first to study wind electricity applications under the pioneer Poul la Cour. The school was the first in Denmark to have a turbine producing electric power. He went on to qualify as an electrician at Copenhagen's Machinist School in 1914, taking a power electronics diploma the following year at Helsingør Technical School.

== Career ==
On the basis of a bank loan, Juul set up his own workshop in Køge working as an electrical installer and power electronics expert. One of his customers was the electricity company SEAS (Sydsjællands Elektricitets Aktieselskab) who gave him responsibility for their grid.

After carefully studying the needs of Danish housewives, he worked on the design of an electric oven. In order to save power and reduce risk, he created a model with hotplates operating at 6, 11 and 14 volts, depending on the amount of heat required. The hotplates heated up much more quickly than on earlier models. His patented design was put into production in 1934 by the firm Lauritz Knudsen (LK), remaining popular until the late 1950s.

Denmark had suffered from fuel shortages during the Second World War. In 1947, Juul therefore embarked on the wind turbine project that was to bring him worldwide fame. After much experimentation with wind tunnels, the first turbine with two blades and producing 10 kW, was developed in 1950 and installed at Vester Egesborg in the south of Zealand. The turbine turned out to be generally self-regulating as the rotor was automatically slowed down by the generator's braking action, even in heavy winds. For additional protection, he invented a system consisting of aerodynamic brakes on the blade tips. Two years later he produced a turbine for Bogø with an output of 45 kW.

Installed at the top of a 25 m (82 ft) tower in 1957, the 200 kW Gedser wind turbine was designed by Johannes Juul on the basis of the Bogø turbine. The Gedser facility ran maintenance free for over 10 years. Now dismantled, its essentials can be seen at the Energy Museum (Energimuseet) near Bjerringbro in central Jutland, while the tower still stands near the east coast, 2 km North of Gedser.

== Visionary views ==
In 1962, the windpower committee stated that the Gedser turbine had operated well and had been able to withstand the pressures of use. It had also been able to produce power for the grid. In the meantime, power produced by coal-fired plants cost 8 to 9 Danish crowns per Gcal while power from the Gedser turbine was costing 19 crowns per Gcal. They therefore concluded there was no reason to continue to develop wind power. Juul, who at the time was 75 and had long been retired, totally disagreed explaining that the experimental turbine at Gedser was over-dimensioned and a compromise between various options with the result that it was only 40% efficient compared to the Bogø efficiency of 53%. Moreover, new materials such as plastics and fibreglass would bring increases in efficiency. Juul's visionary conclusions in 1962 turned out to be confirmed by subsequent progress in the Danish wind industry which 40 years later had become the greatest supplier of turbines to the world market. Today the Gedser wind turbine, referred to as the Danish design, is widely regarded as the basis on which new turbines were developed. The inventor was Johannes Juul.
