= The Great Relief =

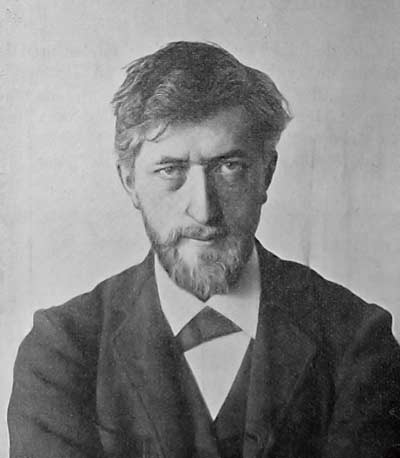
J.F. Willumsen, photographed in 1900

The Great Relief (Danish: Det Store Relief) is a sculpture by the Danish artist J.F. Willumsen completed in 1928. Consisting mainly of marble and gilt bronze, it was included in the 2006 Danish Culture Canon as a masterpiece of Danish culture.

== Background ==
Willumsen first thought of creating the relief when he was at the Chicago World Fair in 1893, envisaging it as a decoration for a wall in one of the city's bars. He started working on it after returning to Paris the same year and continued its development over the next five or six years in Copenhagen. But it was only when he had received an official commission for the work in 1920 that he worked towards its completion, using a large plaster wall specially erected in his house in Stradagervej as a base. Willumsen supervised the selection and cutting of the variously coloured pieces of Carrara marble in Lazzarini's Italian workshop.

== The sculpture ==
In his earliest notes on the work, Willumsen explained he intended to illustrate various degrees of happiness by using different symbols. The lowest degree, which he labels tragicomical, is strong but short-lived without any lasting effects. He sees it as being symbolized by "grotesque musicians". At the middle level comes sensuality or parody, not as powerful as the first but nevertheless leaving its traces. His symbol here is a man and a woman called "the parody". The strange thing is that the woman is dressed in men's battle attire while the man is dressed in a woman's clothes. According to Willumsen, the reaction of the opposite sex is a "quivering sensation" leaving a greater impression than the strong burst of humour at the lowest level. The third and highest level for Willumsen is aesthetic joy. To achieve it, the individual needs to have a sense of beauty.

When presenting his work in 1928, Willumsen described it as a "collocation of figures for Willumsen's view of existence and human life". The relief, he explained, centres on two "giants", dividing it into positive and negative parts. "One of the giants, the one on the left, is designed to represent cool 'reflection', or perhaps more accurately, cool 'calculation'. Above his outstretched right arm, there are two large figures to the left, a man in women's clothing called 'Weakness', tyrannized by a woman, an armour-clad fury called 'War'. The other giant, the one on the right, who is holding's the first one's hand, has a soft expression, he should perhaps be called 'Unsophistication' or 'Instinct'; his eyes are closed. On his outstretched left arm there are two large figures, a man: 'the Worker', the symbol of will and deed, and 'a Woman' who admiringly and affectionately presses the Worker's hand against her throbbing heart." Around the six large figures, there are many smaller figures. They are people 'who along the way go through different states of mind such as rest, fear, and suffering, moving in an anticlockwise direction, starting with 'the Worker' and finishing at life's greatest state of happiness, 'the golden couple'.

== Museum ==
The Great Relief can be seen in J.F. Willumsens Museum in Frederikssund, open Thursday to Sunday from 10 am to 5 pm.
