= Amalie Smith (writer) =

Danish writer and visual artist

Amalie Smith (born 1985) is a Danish writer and visual artist.

She graduated from the Danish Writers' School in 2009 and the Royal Danish Academy of Fine Arts in 2015 (MFA). She works in poetry, prose, video, photography, installation, sound art and generative art.

Three of her books have been translated into Norwegian and/or Swedish, shorter texts translated into English, German, Russian, Spanish and Greenlandic. Marble and Thread Ripper have been translated into English and published by Lolli Editions in 2020 and 2022.

== Awards ==
- 2023: N. L. Høyen Medal
  From citation: "There is every reason to honor the visual artist Amalie Smith. There is every reason to honor the writer Amalie Smith. But today we would like to honor the communicator Amalie Smith, of course to point out the quality of the work, but also to point out the importance of artists also communicating art"
- 2015:Crown Prince Couple's Award
- 2011: Bodil and Jørgen Munch-Christensen debutante prize for De næste 5000 dage
