= Gregers Algreen-Ussing =

Danish architect and professor emeritus (born 1938)

Gregers Algreen-Ussing (born 30 November 1938 in Tehran) is a Danish architect and professor emeritus at the Kunstakademiets Arkitektskole (School of Architecture).

He is the son of an engineer Helge Algreen-Ussing and teacher Gudrun Benthin. He became a Knight of the Order of the Dannebrog in 1994 and in 2006 he received the NL Høyen medal. He has been married to psycho-analylist Judy Gammelgaard since 1982.

== Awards ==
Andersen-Ussing received the N. L. Høyen Medal in 2006.

== See also ==
- List of Danish architects
