= J. F. Willumsen =

Danish artist and architect (1863–1958)

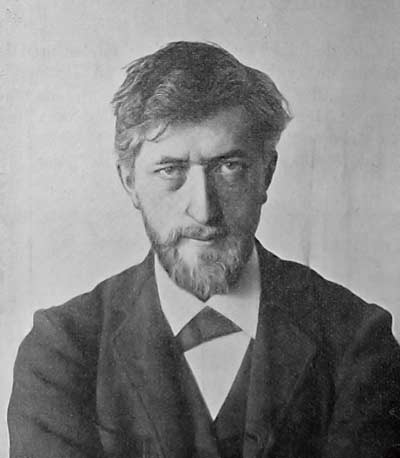
Jens Ferdinand Willumsen

Jens Ferdinand Willumsen (7 September 1863 – 4 April 1958) was a Danish painter, sculptor, graphic artist, architect and photographer. He became associated with the movements of Symbolism and Expressionism.

== Biography ==
J. F. Willumsen was born in Copenhagen, Denmark. He was the son of Hans Willumsen and Ane Kirstine. He was initially trained in art at the Royal Danish Academy of Fine Arts from 1881 to 1885 and in architecture at the Copenhagen Technical College from 1879 to 1882. He completed his education in 1885 with the artists P.S. Krøyer (1851-1909) and Laurits Tuxen (1853–1927). His works were exhibited in the Paris Salon, the Société Nationale des Beaux-Arts, the Société des Artistes Indépendants, the art gallery of Le Barc de Boutteville and at the Exposition Universelle (1900).

He was employed from 1897 to 1900 as an artistic director at the porcelain factory Bing & Grøndahl. Besides painting, Willumsen had interests in sculpture, architecture, ceramics, and photography, and was an accomplished engraver. His sculpture The Great Relief (completed 1928) was included in the 2006 Danish Culture Canon as one of Denmark's cultural masterpieces.

Willumsen visited Norway in 1892 and had associations with Skagen in the north of Jutland which he first visited in 1906. It was here that he carried out most of the preparatory work on his painting Badende børn på Skagen strand (completed in 1909). Willumsen was an influence on Norwegian landscape painter Kitty Lange Kielland (1843–1914), who attempted to simplify her art in order to follow his style.

In 1910, he toured Spain, Italy, Greece and Tunisia. Willumsen lived almost half of his life in France. He settled in the south of France in 1916. He was awarded the Prince Eugen Medal in 1947. He died in Cannes during 1958.

The J.F. Willumsens Museum, which exhibits many of his works, was opened during 1957 in Frederikssund. There are also paintings by Willumsen in the collection of the ARoS Aarhus Kunstmuseum in Aarhus, Denmark and at the special Victor Petersen's Willumsen Collection near Hjørring.

== Personal life ==
Willumsen was married twice. In 1890 he married sculptor Juliette Meyer. Together they had sons Jan Bjørn in 1891 and Bode in 1895. In 1903, Willumsen, married sculptor Edith Wessel, after being divorced from Juliette. In second marriage he had daughters Ingemor Gersemi in 1906 and Anne-Mathilde in 1909.

== Notes ==
- Hans Bendix (1982) J.F. Willumsen, samvær og rejser (Carit Andersen)
