= Astrid Noack =

Danish sculptor

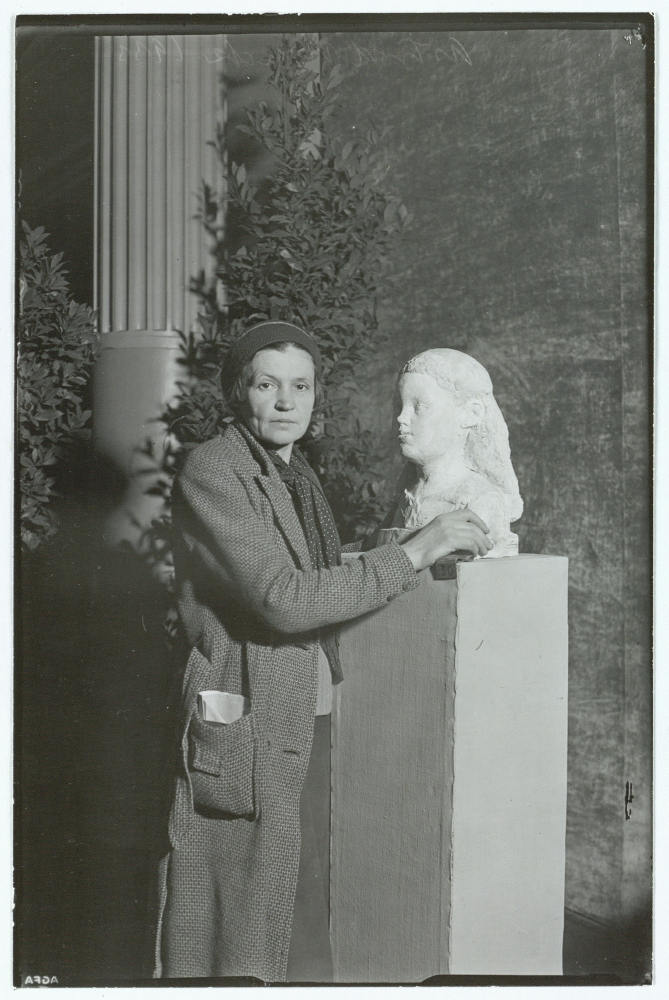
- The artist with her bust of Anna Ancher
- Born: 30 January 1888; Ribe, Denmark
- Died: 26 December 1954 (aged 66); Copenhagen, Denmark
- Known for: Sculpture
- Notable work: Standing Woman
- Awards: Ingenio et Arti, 1940; Thorvaldsen Medal, 1954

Astrid Noack (30 January 1888 – 26 December 1954) was a Danish sculptor who specialized in the human figure, creating works such as the statue of Anna Ancher in Skagen, and her Standing Woman which was included in the Danish Culture Canon.

== Early life ==
Noack was born in Ribe, the daughter of merchant Johan Peter N. (1831–1911) and Johanne Metdine Barkentin (1850–1913). She was the sister of theologian Carl Wulff Noack. In 1902 Noack went to Copenhagen where she earned a living painting porcelain at the Aluminia faience factory. She then attended Vallekilde Folk High School, specializing in sculpture and qualifying as an apprentice in 1910. She continued her studies there under Ivar Bentsen who exerted considerable influence on her, together with other artists, especially Joakim Skovgaard, from the folk high school environment. In collaboration with Skovgaard, she helped to decorate the ceiling of Viborg Cathedral (1948) working as a wood carver. There she also met Niels Larsen Stevns and Arne Lofthus, both of whom encouraged her to work independently as a sculptor.

== Period in Paris ==
In 1920, on a grant, Noack went to Paris which at the time was the focus of the most significant trends in sculpture. She met Adam Fischer who played an important part in her development and in conveying French ideas to Scandinavia. She also befriended Lena Börjeson who had founded the Académie Scandinave free school of sculpture which arranged exhibitions and informal instruction. She studied French Gothic sculpture with the French sculptor Jean Osouf until in 1926 she became a pupil of Fischer and of the French sculptors Charles Despiau and Paul Cornet who helped her to develop her own style. She was the only women to benefit from the French approach to Classical Modernism.

== Return to Denmark ==
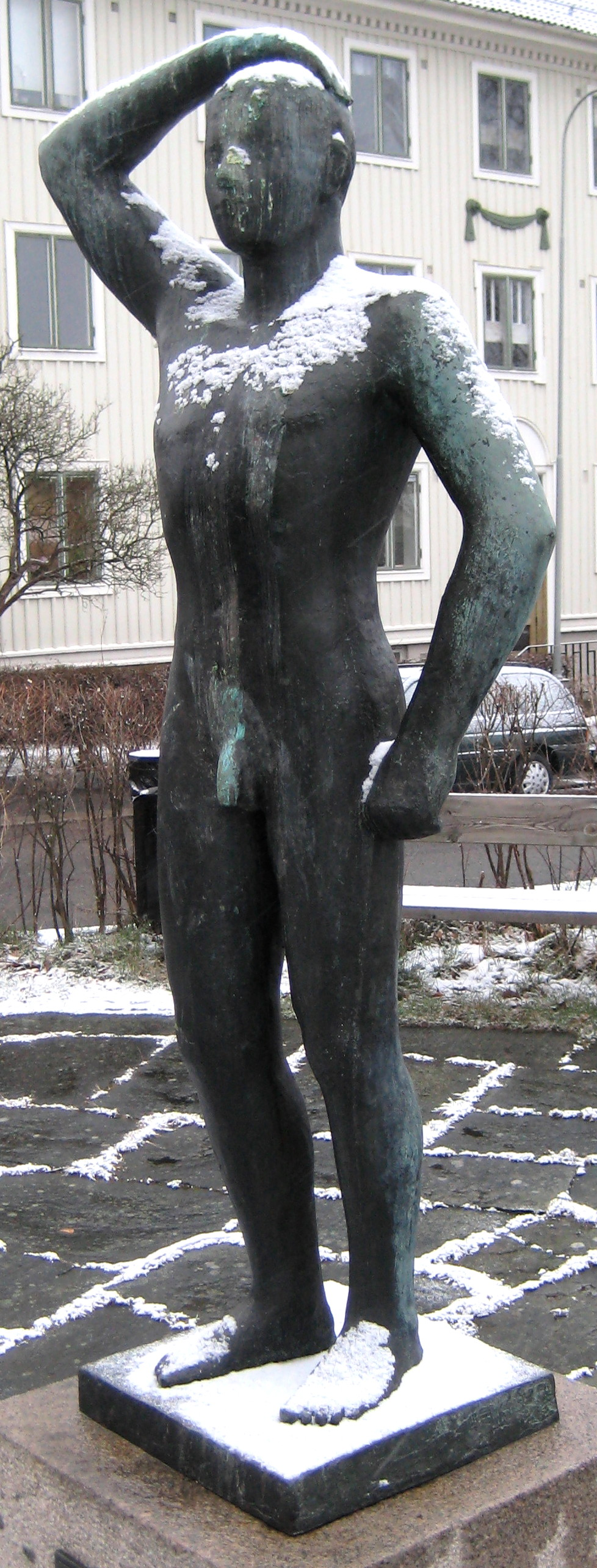
Atrid Noack: "Young Man" (1948) Kungsladugård, Gothenburg

After 12 years in Paris, Noack returned to Copenhagen in 1932 as a result of currency restrictions. She exhibited at the Grønningen, slowly gaining recognition. Between 1936 and 1950, she lived and worked in a courtyard building Rådmandsgade 34 in Nørrebro.

She produced many busts, including some of children. Among her most notable creations are Holtepigen (1937) in French limestone, Stående Kvinde (1942) in teak, her statue of Anna Ancher (1939) for the garden of Skagens Museum and Det korsfæstede Menneske (1945), an unusual depiction of Christ's crucifixion.

== Style ==
Noack's sculptures are inspired by contemporary French art. Expressing an intense relationship between life and art, they focus on the human figure, often simply standing, sitting or kneeling. At a time when mankind was frequently treated with contempt, Noack strove to demonstrate her faith and trust in the human community. Her works are sincere, emanating an almost pious hope that people would again come together.

== Exhibitions and awards ==
Noack exhibited frequently, not just in Denmark but in Paris, Budapest, Helsinki and Rome. In 1955, Kunstforeningen arranged a large retrospective exhibition, as did Holstebro Art Museum in 1988. Noack was awarded the Eckersberg Medal in 1940 and the Thorvaldsen Medal in 1954.
