= Standing Woman (Noack) =

Standing Woman (Danish: Stående kvinde) is a teak sculpture by the Danish sculptor Astrid Noack completed in 1941. Considered to be one of the masterpieces of Danish culture, it was included in the 2006 Danish Culture Canon.

== Description ==
Despite the pressures of the Second World War, Astrid Noack maintained her belief in a world of peace and fellowship. This comes through in her sculptures of human figures which display openness towards mankind with such dignity. Measuring 157 x 47,5 x 56,5 cm, the upright Standing Woman, arms hanging loosely by her sides and one leg slightly bent, faces forward, eyes and chest uplifted, intent yet at peace. Inspired by the sculpture of ancient Egypt and Greece, the figure is characterized by a monumental frontality with only a hint of movement in a bent knee and a hand loosely clutching a cloth. The statue exudes a timeless sense of calm with its austerely stringent form.

== Exhibit ==
The sculpture can be seen in the Gothenburg Museum of Art in Gothenburg, Sweden.
