= Kent Martinussen =

Danish architect

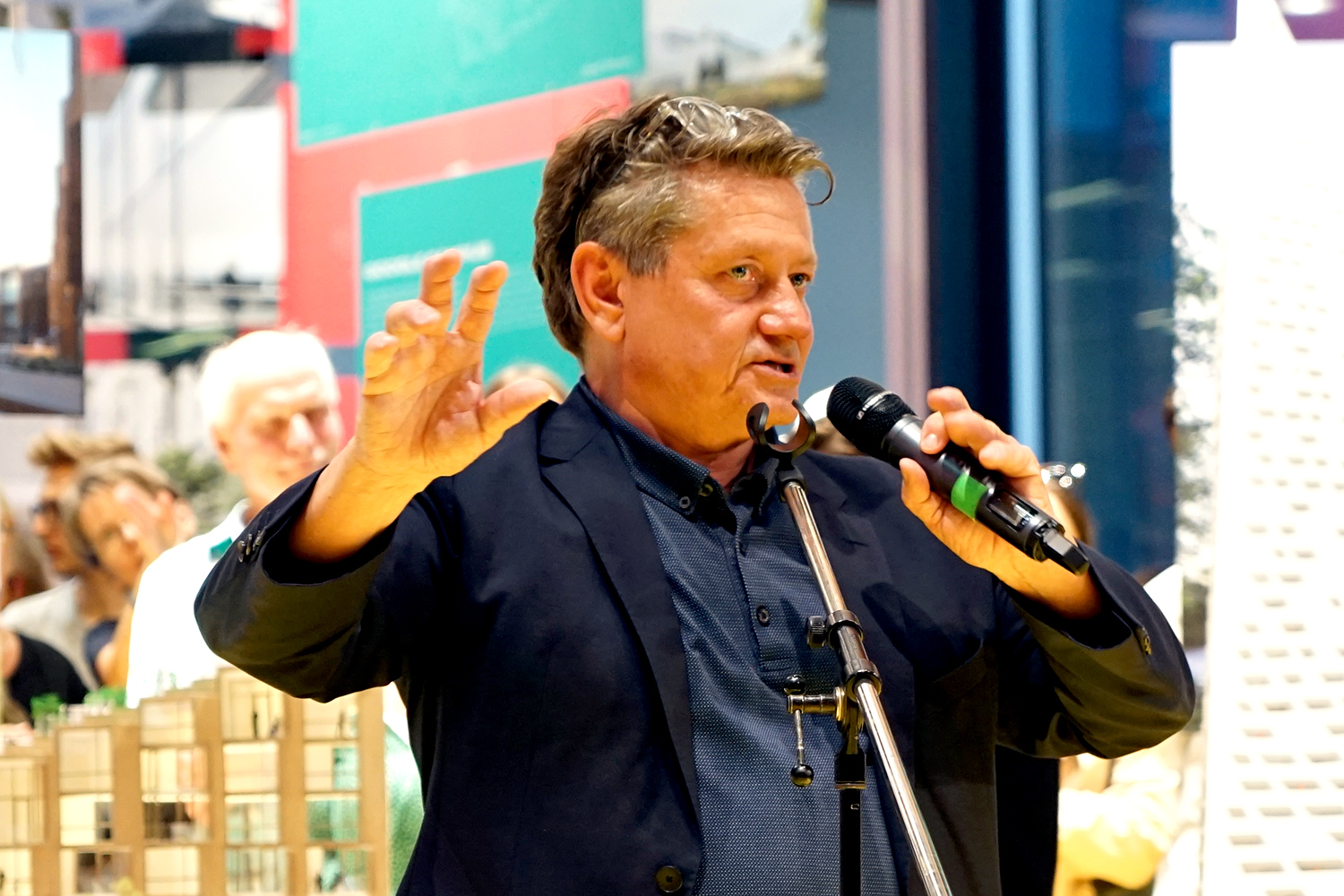
Kent Martinussen (2019)

Kent Martinussen (born 29 December 1960) is a Danish architect and CEO of the Danish Architecture Centre. He was appointed member of the board for the Danish Culture Canon of Architecture in 2005.

Kent Martinussen has earned his baccalaureate in social studies and languages in 1981 and subsequently studied architecture at academies in Paris, Milan and the Royal Danish Academy of Fine Arts´ School of Architecture in Copenhagen, where he graduated in 1989.

Martinussen has been running his own architectural practice, while lecturing and researching at universities and architecture academies both in Denmark and abroad. He has been in charge of producing several independent architectural projects, all exhibited abroad, including the International Architecture Biennale in Venice and architectural triennials in Japan and the Middle East. Kent Martinussen has been awarded the Danish Arts Foundations 3-year work scholarship, has served on several committees and boards and has been the holder of other honorary positions (The Architects’ Association of Denmark, Akademiraadet – the board of The Royal Academy for Fine Arts, The Danish Architecture Institute, the Business Board of Roskilde Charity Society, architectural juries and committees), as well as acting as advisor for a number of Danish municipalities and businesses.

He is a member of the board of the Danish Cultural Canon of Architecture. He is also a member of the international jury for the 9th International Architecture Biennale in Venice and chairman of the award committee for one of the world’s most influential architectural awards, The Nykredit Architecture Prize. As CEO of The Danish Architecture Centre, Martinussen and his colleagues received the Golden Lion at the International Venice Biennale of Architecture for Best Pavilion in 2006. He received an honorary award from the American Institute of Architects and the Henning Larsen Honorary Scholarship. Since 2001, Kent Martinussen has held the position as CEO for the Danish national centre of architecture, construction and urban planning, the Danish Architecture Centre, shortened to DAC. His main focus in the field of architecture is its potential to contribute with solutions and answers to the challenges of today’s globalization.

== Awards ==
In 2008, Kent Martinussen became Knight of the Order of the Dannebrog. He received the N. L. Høyen Medal in 2015.
