= Stjerne til støv =

Stjerne til støv is the final song, and title song, of the album Stjerne til støv (1981) by Sebastian (Danish musician). The song was selected as one of 12 popular songs within the Danish Culture Canon.
