= Gedser wind turbine =

Coordinates: 54.5975°N 11.9228°E

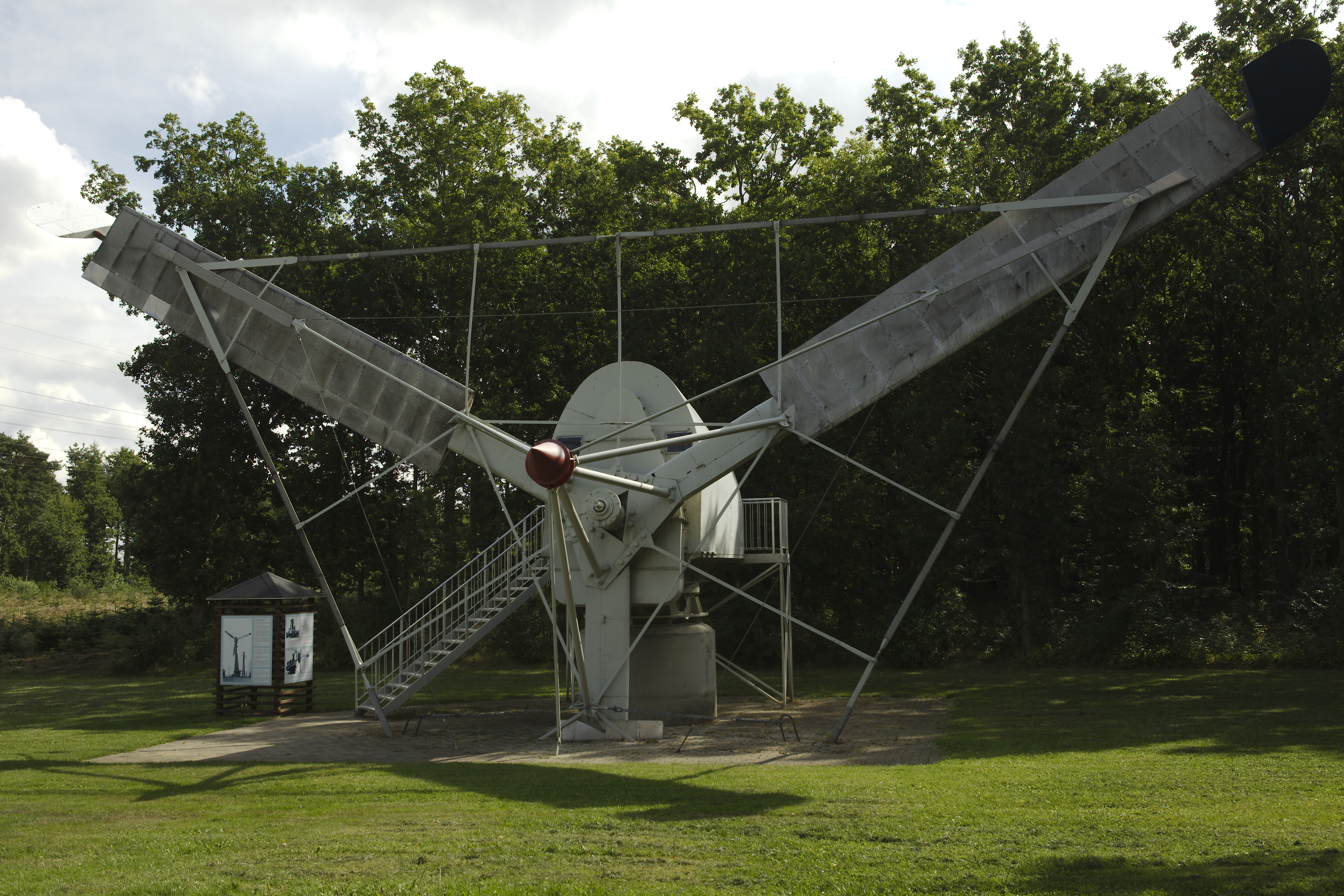
Gedser wind turbine today at the Energy Museum Bjerringbro

The Gedser wind turbine is located near Gedser in the south of the Danish island of Falster. It was constructed by the engineer Johannes Juul in 1957 for the SEAS (Sydsjællands Elektricitets Aktieselskab) electricity company with support from the Marshall Plan. Its innovative design was a major breakthrough in the development of wind turbines.

== Design ==
As a 17-year-old, Johannes Juul (1887–1969) had studied wind electricity applications under Poul la Cour at Askov Højskole, a folk high school, in 1904. In the early 1950s, he built two smaller alternating current turbines which operated at Vester Egesborg near Næstved and on the island of Bogø. His three-bladed Gedser facility (1957) was Denmark's first large wind turbine. With a blade span of 24 m (79 ft), it produced 200 kW of alternating current fed directly into the grid. Its electromechanical yawing, asynchronous generator, and the three stall-regulated blades with emergency aerodynamic tip brakes (these were invented by Juul) is a design that is still widely used in Denmark. Stall control was provided through an asynchronous generator. The turbine, which for many years was the world's largest, operated from 1957 to 1967 without maintenance, demonstrating incredible durability. In connection with NASA testing for the U.S. wind energy programme, it was refurbished in 1975 and brought back into operation. It continued to run for a few years, providing test data for the further development of wind turbines in Denmark. Over the course of its lifetime, the Gedser wind turbine generated 2.2 million kW-hours (7.9 TJ).

The turbine's straightforward design, safety features, and low cost were key assets. It was one of Denmark's most important innovations since the Second World War. The design served not only as a basis for developments in Denmark but was adopted by wind turbine manufacturers around the globe, who referred to it as the "Danish design". Its design was considered seminal for the modern wind industry. In 2006, it was included in the design section of the Danish Culture Canon.

== Museum exhibit ==
In 1992, the turbine was dismantled. In 2006, the nacelle and the rotor blades were taken to the Energy Museum (Energimuseet) near Bjerringbro in central Jutland where they were reassembled as part of the museum's collection.
