= Poul Vad =

Danish writer and art historian (1927–2003)

- Born: 27 April 1927; Silkeborg, Denmark
- Died: 18 August 2003 (aged 76)
- Education: University of Copenhagen (BA in art history); University of Copenhagen (MA in art history)
- Alma mater: University of Copenhagen
- Occupation: Art historian
- Writing career
- Language: Danish
- Years active: 1950s–1990s
- Genre: Novel
- Notable work: Kattens anatomi
- Notable awards: Danish Academy Award; N. L. Høyen Medal
- Literary movement: Modernism

Poul Vad (1927–2003) was a Danish writer and art historian who also worked as a consultant at Holstebro Art Museum. He wrote novels, monographs and critical essays on artistic subjects, and started his literary career as a poet in Heretica.

== Biography ==
Vad was born in Silkeborg on 27 April 1927. He studied art history at the University of Copenhagen and received a master's degree in the same subject in 1958.

His literary career began when he published poems in the literary magazine Heretica in 1956. Then he contributed to another magazine Vindrosen. From 1961 to 1964 he edited the art journal Signum.

Vad was the consultant at Holstebro Art Museum between 1965 and 1981. He taught art history at the University of Copenhagen from 1972 to 1974.

His debut novel was De nøjsomme (Danish: The frugal) which was published in 1960. Vad's most known novel is Kattens anatomi (Danish: The anatomy of the cat) published in 1978. Following the publication of this novel he became one of the leading figures of the Danish prose modernism. His other novels include Dagen før livet begynder (1970; Danish: The Day Before Life Begins) and Taber og vinder (1967; Danish: Loser and winner). He published another novel, Nord for Vatnajøkel (Danish: North of Vatnajøkel), in 1994 which contains the features of the travel literature.

Vad received the Danish Academy Award in 1979. He was also awarded N. L. Høyen Medal in 2003.

Vad died on 18 August 2003.
