= Sid Bradley =

British historian

Sidney Arthur James Bradley (born 1936) is an academic, author and specialist in Anglo-Saxon literature.

In his best known publication, Anglo-Saxon Poetry, Bradley has translated into modern English prose virtually the entire corpus of extant Anglo-Saxon poetry. Bradley studied Anglo-Saxon at University College, Oxford, and subsequently taught it at King's College London then in the University of York where he became a Professor of English and Related Literature. From 1990 he was seconded to the Centre for Grundtvig Studies in the Theology Faculty of the University of Aarhus, Denmark, as a Research and Teaching Associate, during which period he published articles on N. F. S. Grundtvig (1783-1872) exploring the nature of Grundtvig's indebtedness to Anglo-Saxon literature and culture. He continues to write on this subject, such as in Grundtvig-Studier 2016, in a collaborative discussion (with Professor K. E. Bugge) of Grundtvig's treatment of the topic of Christ's Descent into Hell. Bradley also served for some years as an editor of the annual journal Grundtvig-Studier, and prepared a major work on biographical texts relating to Grundtvig. His publications have also touched on medieval Danish historiography, Danish ballads, English medieval literature, iconography and literature in the English post-Conquest period, archaeology, 17th-century Danish and English political tracts, and English 18th-century bawdy songs. Since retirement he has served as Chairman of the Trustees of the Friends of St Gregory's Minster in Kirkdale, North Yorkshire, promoting the preservation and interests of this distinguished Anglo-Saxon church. He is a member of the editorial committee of the twice-yearly magazine of the Confederation of Scandinavian Societies, for which journal he also writes.

== Publications ==
S. A. J. Bradley's publications include:

- Anglo-Saxon Poetry. An anthology of Old English poems in prose translation (editor, translator). London 1982 (and reprints).
- The Danish Version of Mandeville's Travels in 16th-century Epitome (editor, translator). Lampeter 1998.
- N.F.S.Grundtvig's Transcriptions of The Exeter Book: An Analysis. Copenhagen 1998.
- Grundtvig in International Context: Studies in the Creativity of Interaction by A. M. Allchin (editor), S. A. J. Bradley (editor), N. A. Hjelm (editor), J. H. Schjørring (editor). Aarhus 2000.
- N. F. S. Grundtvig. A Life Recalled. An Anthology of Biographical Source-Texts (editor, translator). Aarhus 2008
- Numerous articles especially on Grundtvig and Anglo-Saxon culture in the annual journal Grundtvig-Studier.
