= Tyge Hvass =

Danish architect

Tyge Hvass (5 July 1885 – 4 September 1963) was a Danish functionalist architect. He was most notable for his design work on the J.F. Willumsens Museum in Frederikssund.

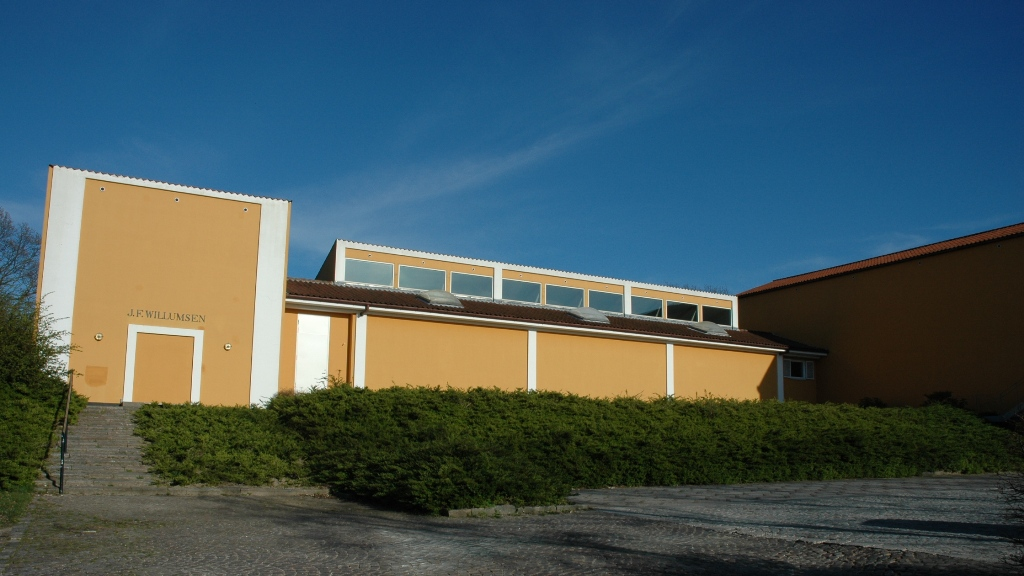
J.F. Willumsen Museum in Frederikssund Built in 1957 with design by architect Tyge Hvass and expanded with an extension in 2005 designed by architect Theo Bjerg

== Biography ==
Hvass was born in Randrup, Denmark. He was the son of Franciscus Tertius Hvass and Christine Cathrine Henriette Kopp. He attended the Aalborg Technical School in 1905 and was admitted to the Royal Danish Academy of Fine Arts, School of Architecture in Copenhagen in 1906. He was employed by architect Anton Rosen from 1908-16. In 1922, Hvass established his own firm.

He conducted design work at the World Exhibition in San Francisco (1915) and for Kay Fisker at the construction of the Danish building at the International Exhibition in Paris (1925). He was the architect for the Danish exhibition in Cologne (1927) and for the Danish exhibition at the Brooklyn Museum in New York City (1928) and for the Danish building at the International Expositions in Barcelona (1929), Antwerp (1930), Brussels (1935), Paris (1937) and New York City (1939).

He received Gerickes Legat (1907), K. A. Larssens Legat (1909), (1915) and (1925), Hors de concours at the International Exhibition in Paris (1925), Theophilus Hansens Legat (1929) and received the Eckersberg Medal (1938). He died during 1963 in Copenhagen.
