= Erik Moltke =

Danish runologist, writer, and editor

Erik Moltke (4 April 1901 – 19 October 1984) was a Danish runologist, writer, and editor. Through his leadership, the Runologist Section of the National Museum of Denmark became a world centre for the scientific study of runology.

In 1942, Moltke and Lis Jacobsen published the standard edition of Danish inscriptions. Moltke also held the position of Chief Editor of the National Museum of Denmark's series of volumes on Denmark's churches until his wife Elna Møller assumed the position in 1970.

== Publications ==
Note: This section may be incomplete.

- Moltke, Erik (1985). Runes and Their Origin: Denmark and Elsewhere. Copenhagen: Nationalmuseets Forlag. ISBN 87-480-0578-9
