= Hover Church =

Coordinates: 56°08′35″N 08°24′40″E

- Hover Kirke
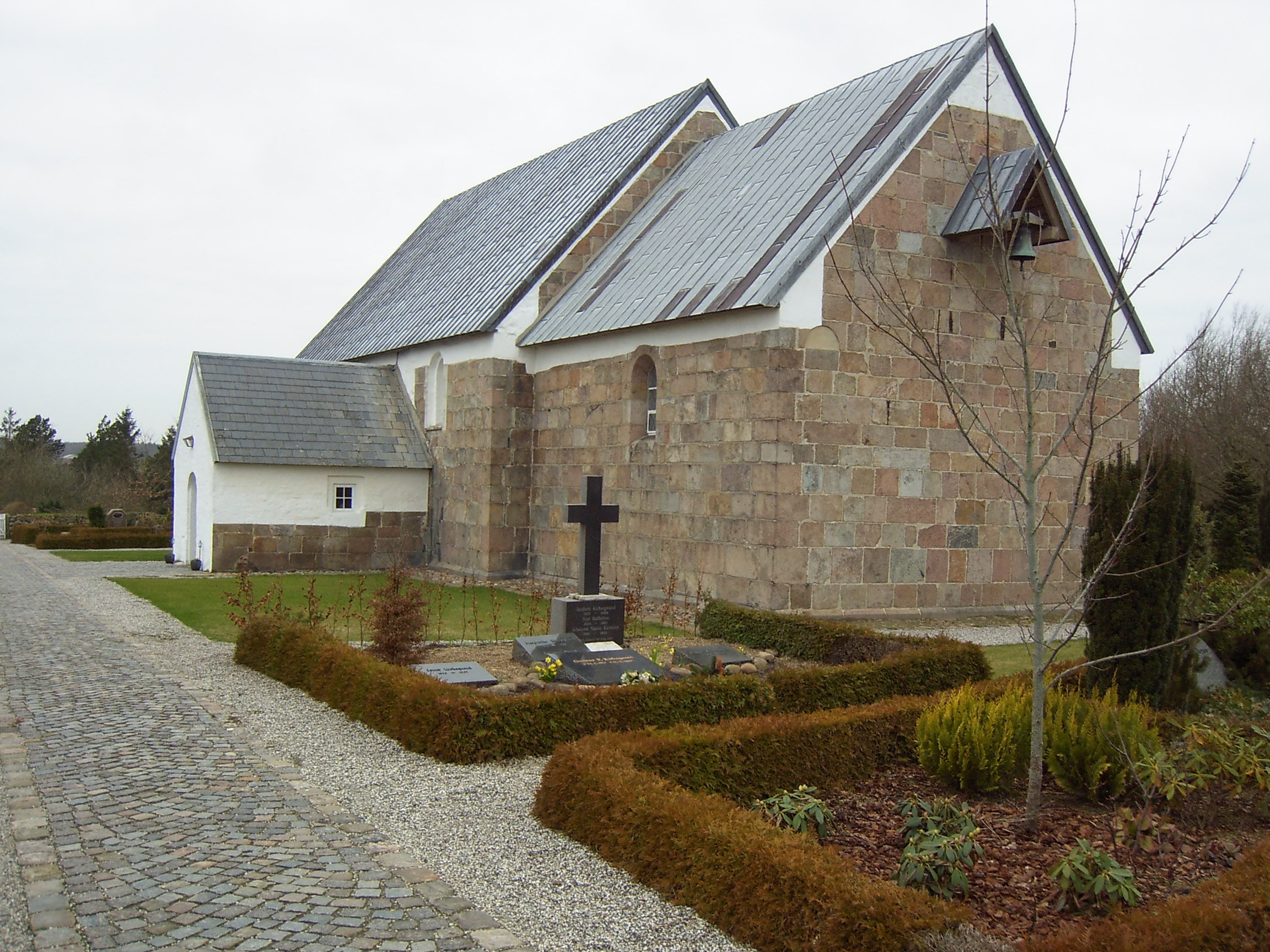
- Hover Church
- Country: Denmark
- Denomination: Church of Denmark

Architecture
- Years built: 12th century

Administration
- Diocese: Diocese of Haderslev
- Deanery: Ringkøbing Provsti
- Parish: Hover Sogn

Hover Church (Hover kirke) is located approximately 2 kilometres (1.2 mi) west of the village of Hover in Ringkøbing-Skjern Municipality, Denmark. Built in twelfth century, it is one of Denmark's oldest stone churches. Not much has changed in its shape and appearance over the past 800 years, making it a good example of old Danish architecture. Hover Church is included within the Danish Culture Canon in the Architecture category.

== Location ==
Located near Ringkøbing on the west coast of Jutland, the church stands as a landmark over the surrounding fields and heath, giving perspective and character to the landscape.

== History ==
Completed in the first half of the twelfth century, it is one of the oldest churches in the country. In 1771, the church's west gable was damaged by a storm. A heavy buttress now supports one wall. The porch was built in the 1500s in late Gothic style on the south side of the church, where the men's entrance once was. The women's entrance was on the north side of the church. The frescoes are dated to the sixteenth century. Restoration work was carried out in the 1960s.

== Architecture and fittings ==
Emulating the design of earlier wooden churches and standing on a sloping foundation, Hover Church is built of hewn granite in the Romanesque style. The nave is rectangular, the chancel is almost square, and the four simply-glazed windows are small and high. Unlike most other Danish churches, Hover does not have a bell tower, but instead has a small bell that hangs under an overhang on the east gable.

The church interior is very similar to other Danish churches. It has a pulpit, altar, baptismal font, organ and benches. It has a flat ceiling and a rounded chancel arch. The altar is of solid granite blocks while the altarpiece (late 17th century) displays a copy of the painting Vandringen til Emmaus by Anton Dorph (original in the Emmaus Church, Frederiksberg). The pulpit (1596) shows the four Evangelists, Matthew, Mark, Luke and John. The font is as old as the church itself. It was previously painted and later acid-washed. The organ (1968) was built by Frobenius Orgelbyggeri and is equipped with 8 votes distributed between one manual and pedal. One of the chair backs in the church has a motif with a crossbow with the date 1575.

== Frescoes ==
In 1907, a fresco was uncovered on the chancel arch wall depicting Isaac's sacrifice, possibly after a woodcut in Christian III's Bible. There were traces of earlier frescoes but they have now been covered with limewash.

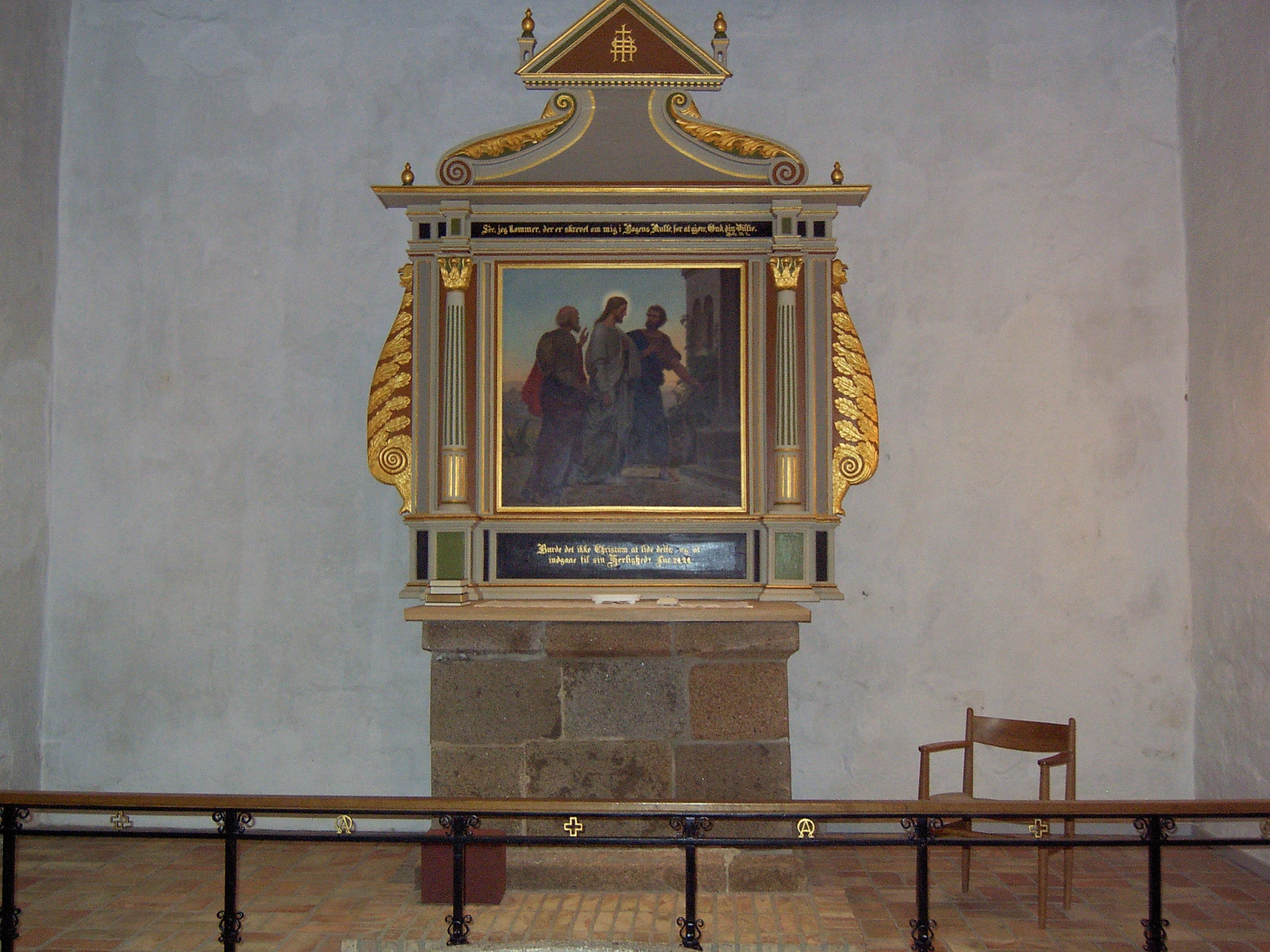
Altarpiece

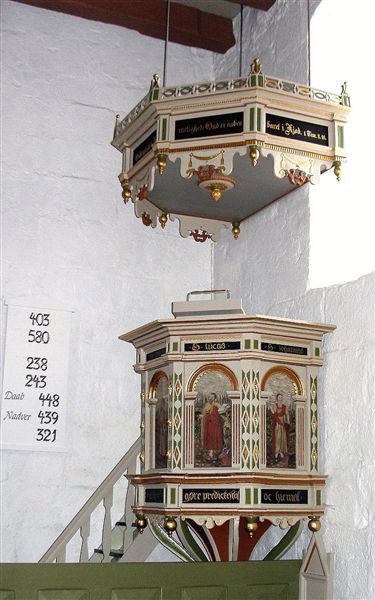
Pulpit

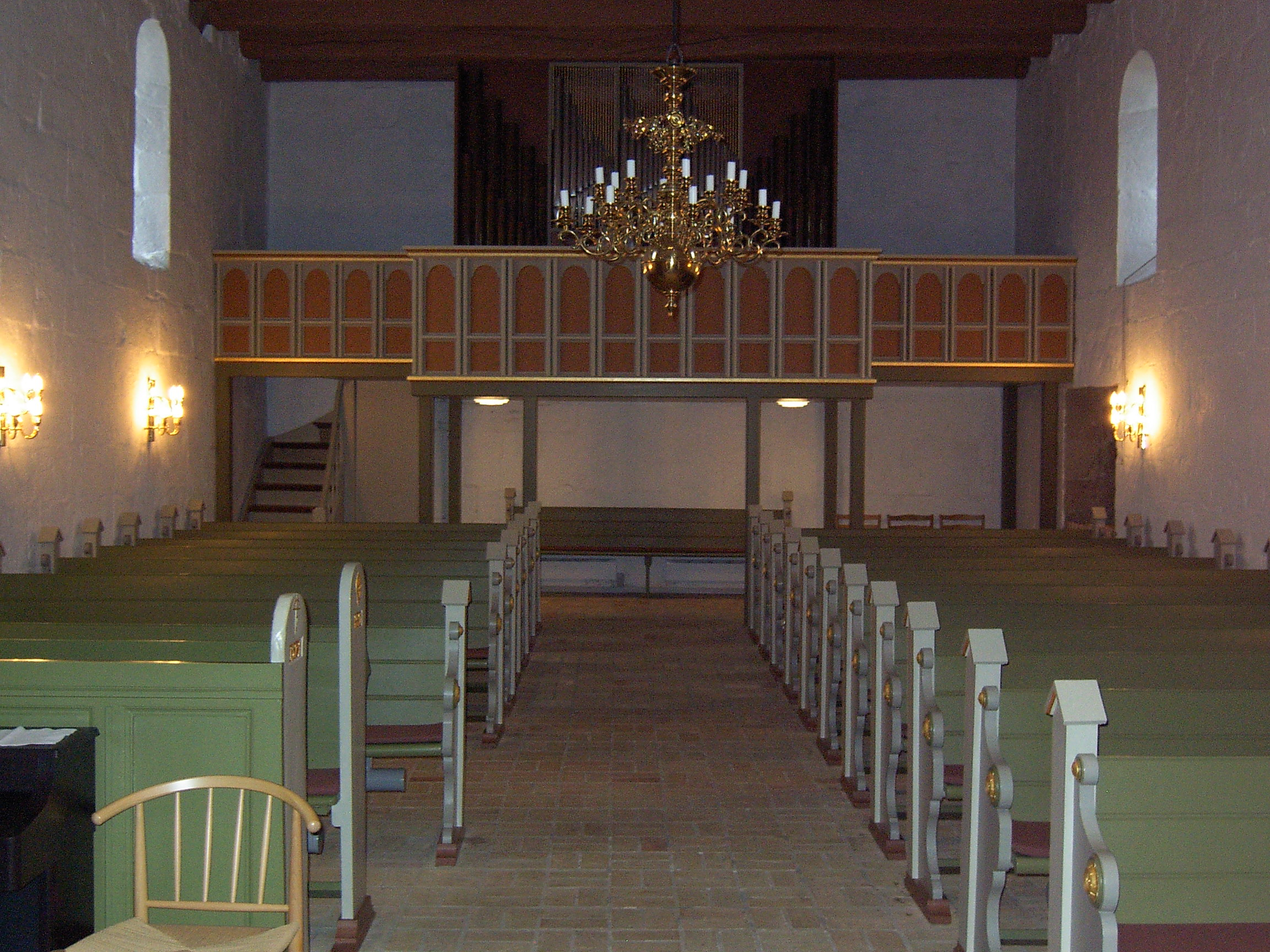
Nave and organ loft

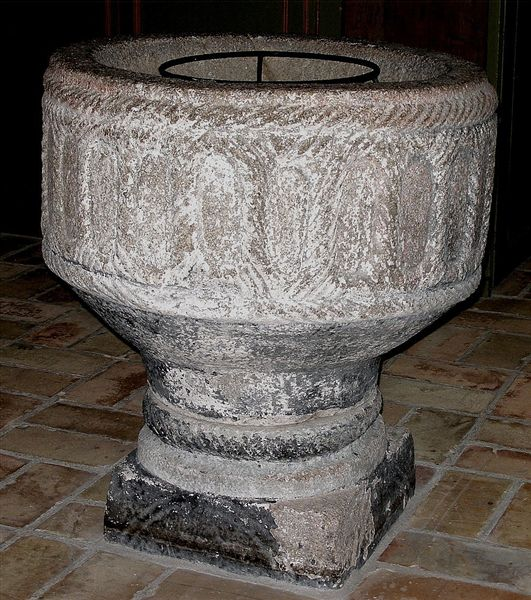
Font

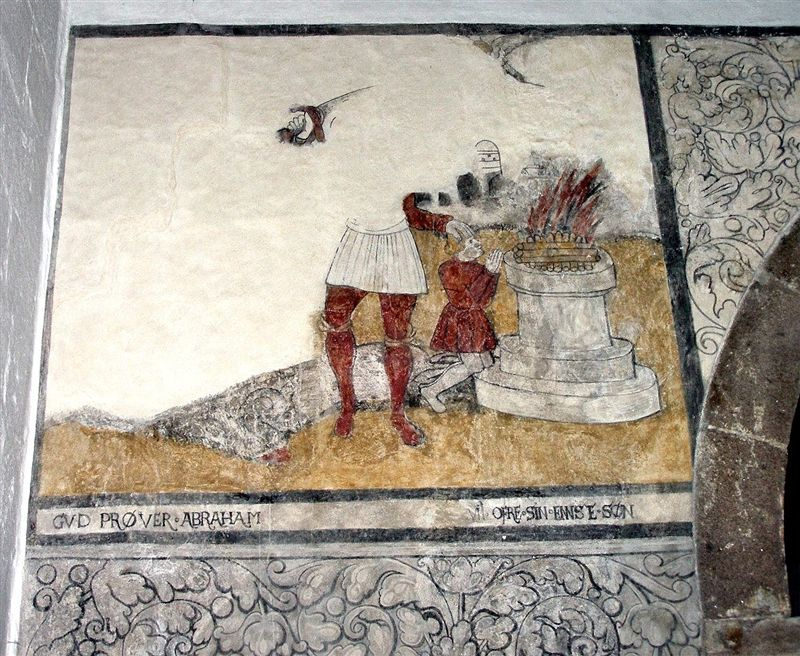
Fresco: Abraham sacrificing Isaac
