= Thomas Laub =

Danish organist and composer

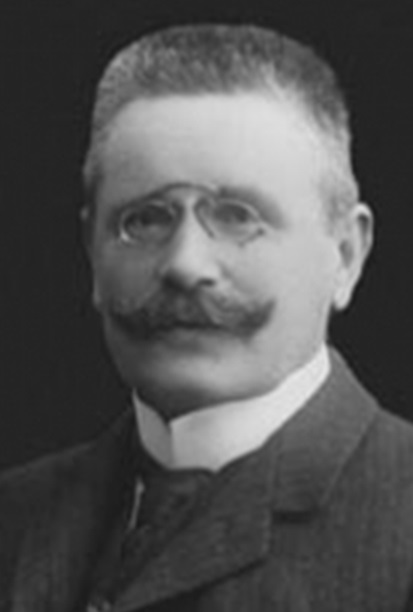

Thomas Linnemann Laub (5 December 1852 – 4 February 1927) was a Danish organist and composer. He was associated with the 20th century revival of religious music in the country.

== Biography ==
Thomas Laub was born on 5 December 1852. While he originally studied theology, he attended the Copenhagen Conservatory from 1873 to 1876 and was taught by music theorist Johann Christian Gebauer. He was an organist at Helligåndskirke in Copenhagen between 1884 and 1891, and became organist at Holmens Kirke in 1891. Laub would remain its organist for several decades.

During his tenure, Laub set out to reform the Lutheran Church of Denmark's hymn repertoire. He was opposed to the romanticized Danish hymns of the day and viewed medieval and Reformation singing as more proper. In particular, he viewed Gregorian chant as melodically superior, and chorales as the ideal form of devotional music.

As part of these reform efforts, Laub rewrote several Danish-language hymns and sequences by poets including N. F. S. Grundtvig. His compositions, and his research views, were outlined in his three best-known books: 1887's Om Kirkesangen (On Sacred Song), 1918's Dansk Kirkesang (Danish Songs for the Church), and 1920's Musik og Kirke (Music and the Church).

Laub also took an interest in Danish folk ballads, which at the time were available primarily as 19th-century copies, arranged in romantic style by contemporary Danish composers. Laub believed these rearrangements were overly ornamented and that they obscured some of the ballads' origins in medieval music. He compiled several folk songs, restored to what he viewed as their true medieval character, in two editions of Danske Folkeviser med Melodier (Danish Folk Songs with Melodies) published in 1899 and 1904. In 1922, with Carl Nielsen, Oluf Ring, and Thorvald Aagaard, Laub published Folkehøjskolens melodibog, a song collection that contained some of his secular compositions.

Though Laub was often criticized during his lifetime, and his hymns were not widely adopted by congregations, church musician's opinions began to shift over the years. The Danish Hymn Society was founded in 1922 to spread his ideas; this movement, called "Laubianismen," has retained influence into the 2000s.

== Notable works ==
- 1887 Om Kirkesangen
- 1888 80 rytmiske Koraler, en enstemmig samling
- 1889–1891 Kirkemelodier, tre hæfter med firstemmige udsættelser
- 1890 10 gamle danske Folkeviser udsatte for blandet kor
- 1896 Udvalg af Salmemelodier i Kirkestil
- 1899 Danske Folkeviser med gamle Melodier I med Axel Olrik,
- 1902 Udvalg af Salmemelodier i Kirkestil, bind 2.
- 1904 Danske Folkeviser med gamle Melodier II med Axel Olrik
- 1909 Forspil og Melodier. Forsøg i Kirkestil
- 1915 En Snes danske Viser med Carl Nielsen
- 1917 En Snes danske Viser, hæfte 2 (igen med Carl Nielsen)
- 1918 koralbogen Dansk Kirkesang
- 18920 Musik og Kirke
- 1920 Tolv viser og sange af danske digtere
- 1920 Ti Aarestrupske ritorneller
- 1922 30 danske sange for 3 og 4 lige stemmer
- 1922 Udkom Folkehøjskolens Melodibog med en række folkelige melodier af Th. Laub
- 1928 24 salmer og 12 folkeviser udsat for 2 og 3 lige stemmer

== See also ==
- List of Danish composers
