= N. L. Høyen Medal =

Award from the Royal Danish Academy of Fine Arts

The Høyen Medal is one of several medals awarded by the Royal Danish Academy of Fine Arts. It is named after Niels Laurits Høyen, known as the first Danish art historian.

The N. L. Høyen Medal is awarded to art historians and other theorists, arts administrators, educators and journalists.

== Recipients ==
=== 1980s ===
- 1984 Ole Braunstein
- 1984 Elna Møller
- 1984 Poul Pedersen
- 1985 Viggo Clausen
- 1985 Ole Thomassen
- 1986 Poul Hansen
- 1986 Hans Jørgen Brøndum
- 1987 Holger Windfeldt Schmidt
- 1987 Robert Dahlmann
- 1988 Tobias Faber
- 1989 Hans Erling Langkilde

=== 1990s ===
- 1990 Lisbet Balslev Jørgensen
- 1991 Per Arnoldi
- 1992 Mogens Krustrup
- 1992 Arne Karlsen
- 1993 Hans Edvard Nørregård-Nielsen
- 1994 Poul Erik Skriver
- 1995 Hakon Lund
- 1995 Kjeld de Fine Licht Licht
- 1995 Else Marie Bukdahl
- 1996 Allan de Waal
- 1996 Troels Andersen
- 1998 Ejner Johansson
- 1998 Karsten Ohrt
- 1998 Poul Erik Tøjner
- 1998 Kim Dirckinck-Holmfeld
- 1999 Grete Zahle
- 1999 Henrik Bramsen

=== 2000s ===
- 2000 Kjeld Vindum
- 2000 Ulla Strømberg
- 2001 Nils-Ole Lund
- 2001 Annemarie Lund
- 2001 Kjeld Kjeldsen
- 2001 Charlotte Christensen
- 2002 Carsten Thau
- 2002 Henrik Sten Møller
- 2002 Bodil Kaalund
- 2003 Poul Vad
- 2003 Torsten Bløndal
- 2004 Bente Scavenius
- 2004 John Hunov
- 2004 Lars Marcussen
- 2004 Malene Hauxner
- 2005 Lene Burkard
- 2006 Knud Pedersen
- 2006 Mogens Nykjær
- 2006 Gregers Algreen-Ussing
- 2007 Leila Krogh
- 2007 Jesper Fabricius
- 2007 Jens Kvorning
- 2007 Jan Gehl
- 2008 Rune Gade
- 2008 Merete Ahnfeldt-Mollerup
- 2008 Steen Estvad Petersen
- 2008 Steen Møller Rasmussen
- 2009 Gertrud Købke Sutton

=== 2010s ===
- 2010 Mette Sandbye
- 2011 Mikkel Bogh
- 2012 Cort Ross Dinesen
- 2012 Karen Lintrup
- 2012 Mikael Wivel
- 2013 Teresa Nielsen
- 2013 Thomas Bo Jensen
- 2014 Sanne Kofod Olsen
- 2014 Hanne Raabyemagle
- 2015 Kent Martinussen
- 2015 Lars Dybdahl
- 2016 Inge Merete Kjeldgaard
- 2016 Arkitekt Ib Møller
- 2017 Jan Falk Borup
- 2017 Flemming Friborg
- 2018 Gitte Ørskou
- 2019 Jan Haugaard

=== 2020s ===
- 2020 Karsten Ifversen
- 2023 Amalie Smith

== See also ==
- List of European art awards
