= Elna Møller =

Danish architect and author

Elna Møller Moltke (12 December 1913 – 22 May 1994) was a Danish architect and author.

== Biography ==
Møller was born at Tange Skovgård in Højbjerg parish, Denmark. She was the daughter of Niels Rasmussen Møller (1880–1950) and Johanne Due Thomsen (1880–1959).

She attended Viborg Katedralskole, earning her mathematical graduate degree in 1933. From 1936 to 1938, she worked at the office of architect Johannes Magdahl Nielsen (1862–1941). Møller was admitted to the Royal Danish Academy of Fine Arts, School of Architecture in Copenhagen, from which she graduated in 1941 as an architect.

From 1939, she began to work for the National Museum of Denmark, where from 1944 she began to contribute to the monumental work Danmarks Kirker which set out to provide detailed descriptions of all the churches in Denmark. In 1970, she became the principal editor when she replaced her husband, Erik Moltke.

Møller received an award for her restoration work on two properties in Copenhagen in the 1940s.

== Personal life ==
In 1949, she married Erik Moltke (1901–1984).

Møller died in 1994 in Frederiksberg.

== Awards ==
Møller received the Worsaae Medal in 1983. She received the N. L. Høyen Medal in 1984.
