= Malene Hauxner =

Malene Hauxner (18 September 1942 – 18 January 2012) was a Danish landscape architect, author, educator and professor of Theory, Method and History at the Royal Veterinary and Agricultural University (KVL).

== Biography ==
Hauxner was born in Frederiksberg, Denmark. Her parents were Jørgen Bo and Gerda Rigmor Boisen Bennike. She became a landscape architect after graduating from the Royal Danish Academy of Fine Arts, School of Architecture in 1968. In 1993 she was awarded a doctoral degree (Dr. agronomiae). From 1975 she worked in parallel as assistant professor in retail planning, later as associate professor at KVL. In 1979 she established her own landscape design firm.

She enjoyed a reputation as an unrivaled analyst of landscape architecture in the context of the breakthrough and subsequent transformations of modernism. Her first book Fantasiens Have was published in 1993 considers the early modernist breakthrough from the 1930s while her book Open to the Sky (in Danish as Med himlen som loft) published in 2000 took modernism through its second breakthrough between 1950 and 1970. A third volume is anticipated covering the period 1970 to the 1990s.

She received the Royal Danish Academy’s Høyen Medal for research and dissemination in 2004. From 2005, Hauxner was the driving force behind the symposia, World in Denmark which brings together academics and practitioners of international standing in fields related to landscape architecture. She died after a long illness in a hospice in her native Frederiksberg in 2012.

== Awards ==
She received the Nykredit Architecture Prize in 2003 and the N. L. Høyen Medal in 2004.
