= Merete Ahnfeldt-Mollerup =

Danish architect

Merete Ahnfeldt-Mollerup (born 1963) is a Danish architect, university professor and writer about architecture. Associate professor of Kunstakademiets Arkitektskole, she has authored numerous articles, papers and books. She is a member of the Danish Royal Academy and the Danish Centre for Design Research.

== Awards ==
She received the N. L. Høyen Medal in 2005.

== See also ==
- List of Danish architects
