= Oluf Ring =

Danish composer

Oluf Ring (24 December 1884-26 April 1946) was a Danish composer, known for his folk music work. He composed around 300 melodies, as well as one opera, and was affiliated with prominent Danish composer Carl Nielsen.

== Biography ==
Ring was born 24 December 1884 in Jelling. His father, Marius Sørensen, taught history and Danish at Jelling State Seminary. In 1911, Ring became a teacher in Ribe's educator's college. He began teaching at Skårup Seminary in 1930 and later served as a director for the group Fyns Folkekor.

Ring helped to popularize folk music at the time of World War I together with Thomas Laub, Thorvald Aagaard and Carl Nielsen. This resulted in the publication of Folkehøjskolen's Melodibog in 1922, which the four edited.

Ring's other works included Svinedregen, an operatic adaptation of Hans Christian Andersen's fairy tales. He also edited the Arbejdermelodibogen, a book of folk songs written for workers and popular in Denmark's Social Democrat labour movement.

Ring died on 26 April 1946 in Skårup, Funen.

== See also ==
- List of Danish composers
