= Thorvald Aagaard =

Danish composer, organist, and college teacher

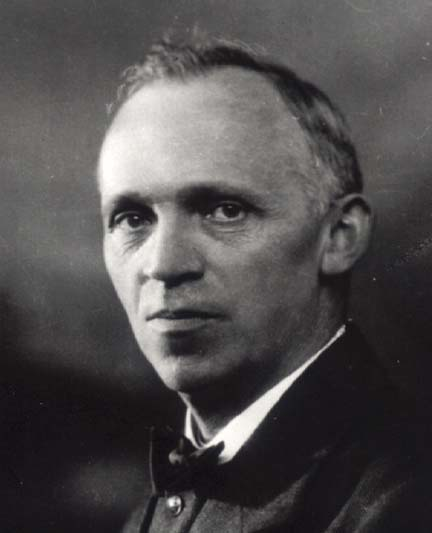
Thorvald Aagaard

"Spurven sidder stum bag kvist" (0:27)

"Jeg ser de bøgelyse øer" (0:45)

"Jeg elsker den brogede verden" (0:23)
All performed by Erik Damskier

Thorvald Aagaard (8 June 1877 – 22 March 1937) was a Danish composer, organist and college teacher.

He was born in Rolsted, Faaborg-Midtfyn. He wrote the music to several continually popular songs, such as "Spurven sidder stum bag kvist" (The sparrow sits in silence behind a twig) and "Jeg ser de bøgelyse øer" (I see the light beech islands). Alongside such composers as Carl Nielsen, Oluf Ring and Thomas Laub, he is considered one of the innovators of Danish popular music.

Aagaard died in Ringe. In his memory, a statue was designed by Søren West and erected in Th. Aagaard Square, by the Valgmenighed (Voluntary Congregation) of Ryslinge where Aagaard served as organist for several years.

== Biographies ==
- Ring, Frands Johann (1954). Thorvald Aagaard : Mennesket, Musikeren. Odense: Fyns Boghandels Forlag. OCLC 7341914 (in Danish)
- Balslev, Povl Chr. (2009). Thorvald Aagaard: komponist og musikformidler i den folkelige sangs tjeneste. Odense : Odense Bys Museer. OCLC 476182051 (in Danish)
