= Skårup =

- Town
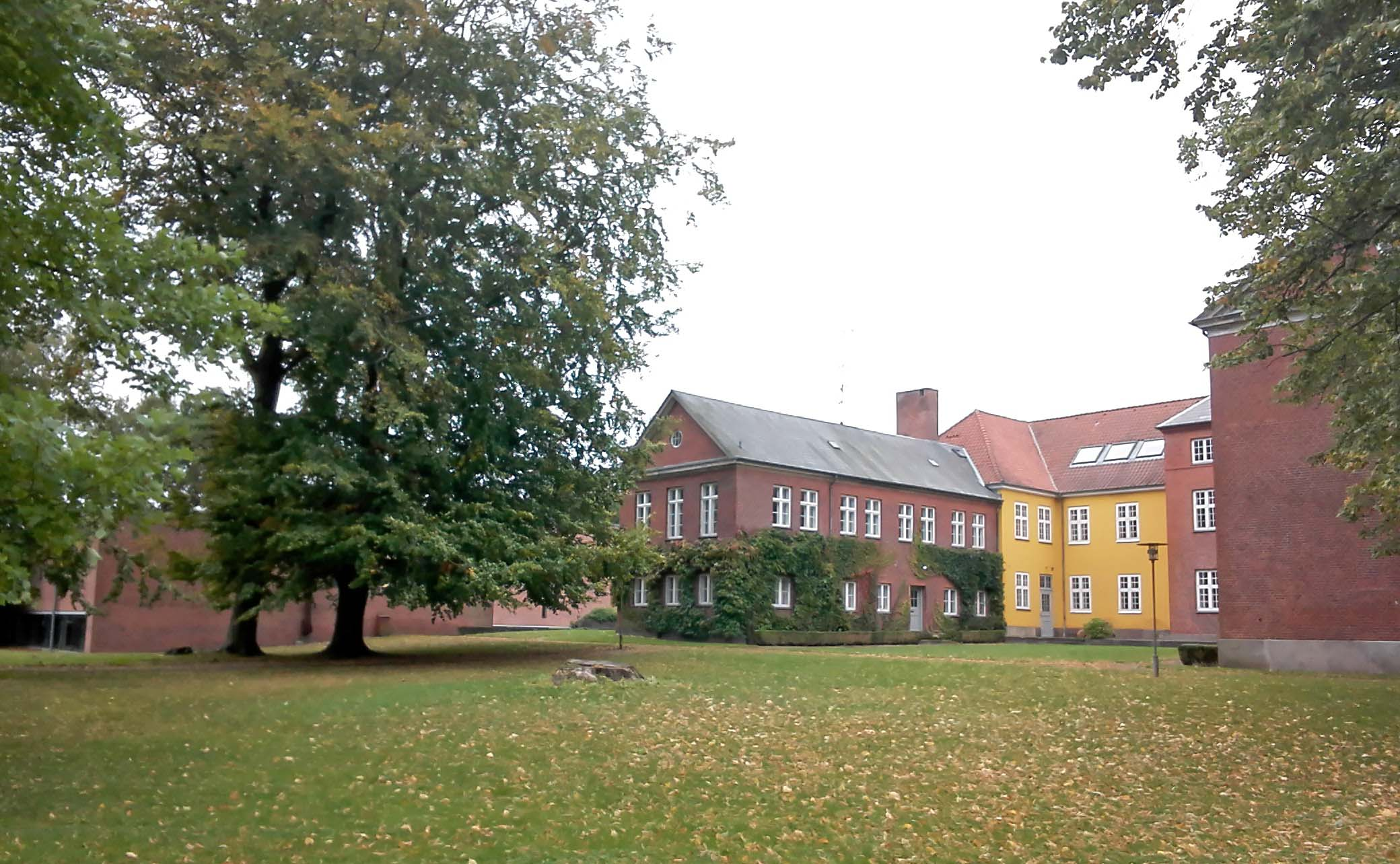
- Skårup Seminarium

- Location in the Region of Southern Denmark
- Coordinates: 55°5′40″N 10°41′49″E
- Country: Denmark
- Region: Southern Denmark
- Municipality: Svendborg

Area
  - Urban: 1.2 km^{2} (0.46 sq mi)

Population (2026)
  - Urban: 1,924
  - Urban density: 1,600/km^{2} (4,200/sq mi)
- Time zone: UTC+1 (CET)
  - Summer (DST): UTC+2 (CEST)

Skårup is a town located on the island of Funen in south-central Denmark in Svendborg Municipality close to the city of Svendborg.

== Seminarium ==
Skårup was previously the location of Skårup Seminarium which closed in 2010. The buildings are still there, although a new use for them has yet to be determined.

== Notable people ==
- Emil Rostrup (1831–1907), Danish botanist, mycologist and plant pathologist and, for 25 years from 1858, a teacher at the pedagogical college Skårup Seminarium in then new subject of natural history.
- Oluf Ring (1884-1946), Danish composer, known for his folk music work. Teacher at Skårup Seminarium from 1930.
