= Erik Aschengreen =

Danish historian (1935–2023)

Erik Aschengreen (31 August 1935 – 9 September 2023) was a Danish historian and dance critic. He was a professor at the University of Copenhagen where he taught the history of ballet. Aschengreen died on 9 September 2023, at the age of 88.

== Publications ==
- Ballet, Forlaget Kronstork Askeby (2020), ISBN 9788793206878
- Dans over Atlanten. USA - Danmark 1900-2014, Gyldendal, Købehavn (2014), ISBN 9788798987024
- Forført af balletten. Ballettens klassikere set over 60 år, Lindhardt og Ringhof Forlag, København (2011), ISBN 9788726299229
- Harald Lander : His Life and Ballets, Dance Books Ltd (2009), ISBN 978-1852731298
- Som jeg kendte dem, Gyldendal, Købehavn (2007), ISBN 978-87-02-05653-2
- Mester. Historien om Harald Lander. SAGA Egmont, København (2005), ISBN 9788726299212
- Der går dans – Den Kongelige Ballet 1948-1998, Gyldendal, København (1998), ISBN 9788700245082
- Balletbogen, Gyldendal, København (1986), ISBN 9788700122482
- Perspektiv på Bournonville, Nyt Nordisk Forlag, København (1980)
- Farlige sylfider. Studier i den romantiske ballet i Frankrig og Danmark, Lindhardt og Ringhof Forlag, København (1975), ISBN 9788726299168
