= Natteravnene =

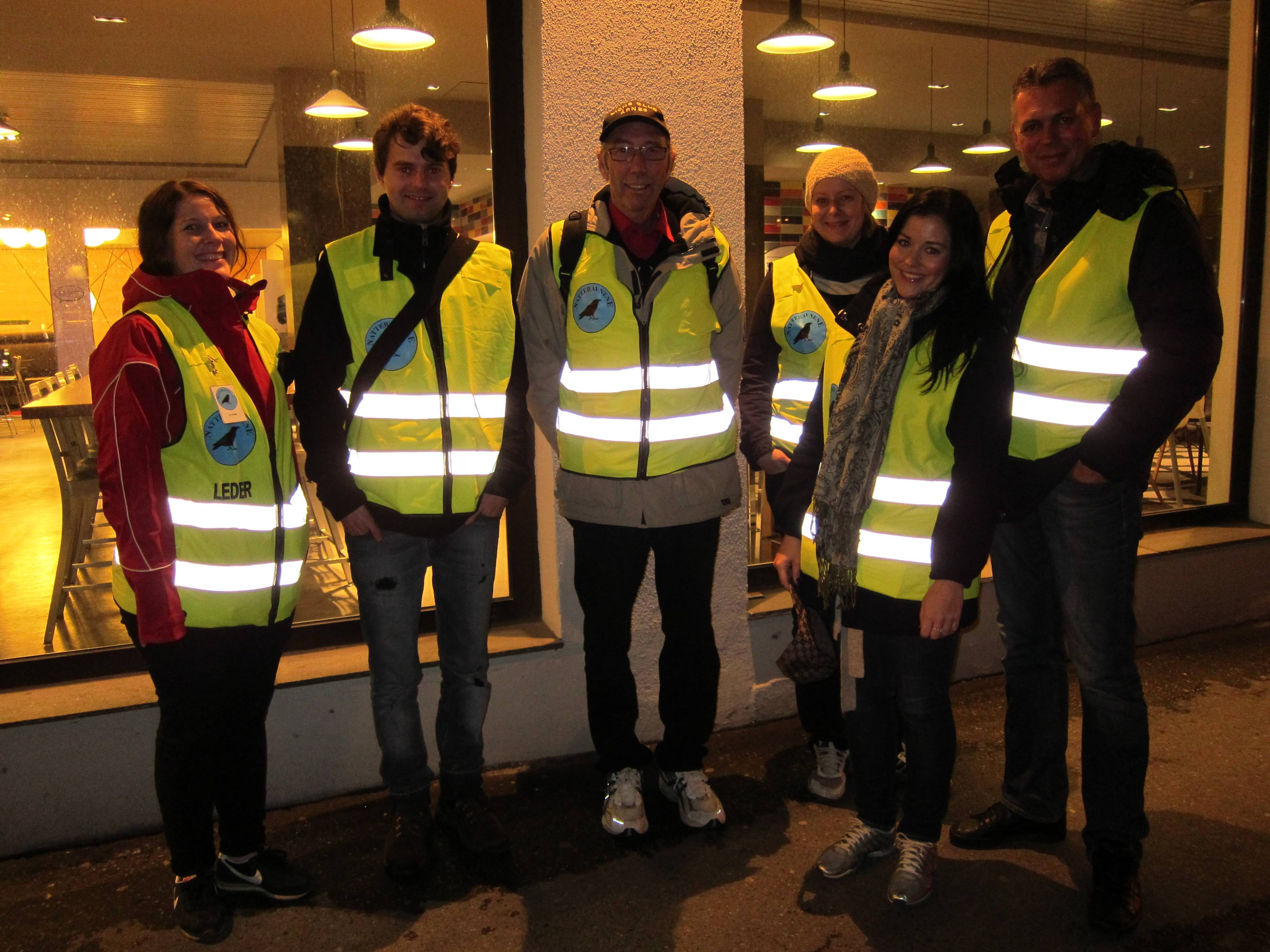
Concerned citizens on patrol in Oslo, a late Friday afternoon

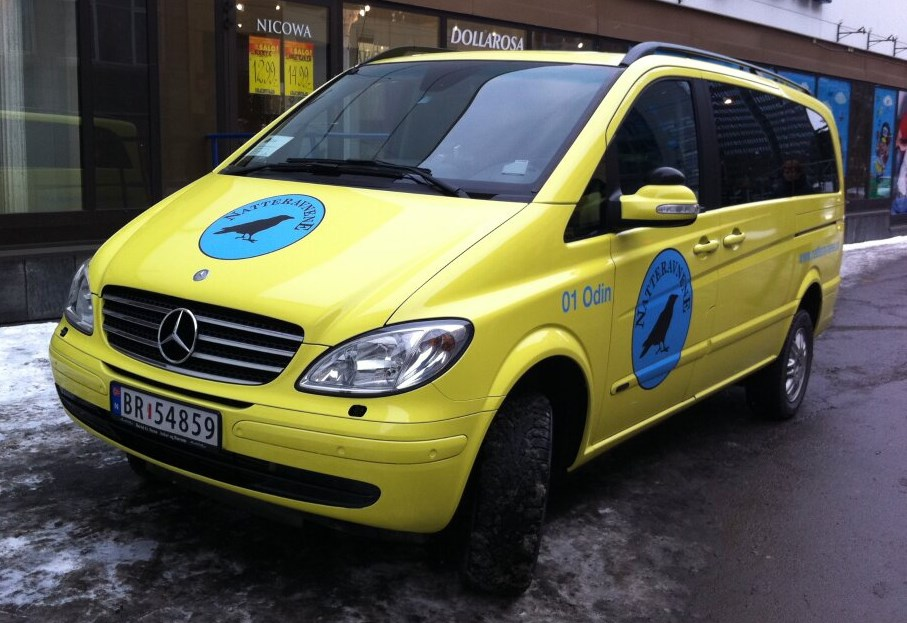
"Odin", one of Natteravnene's vehicles in Oslo

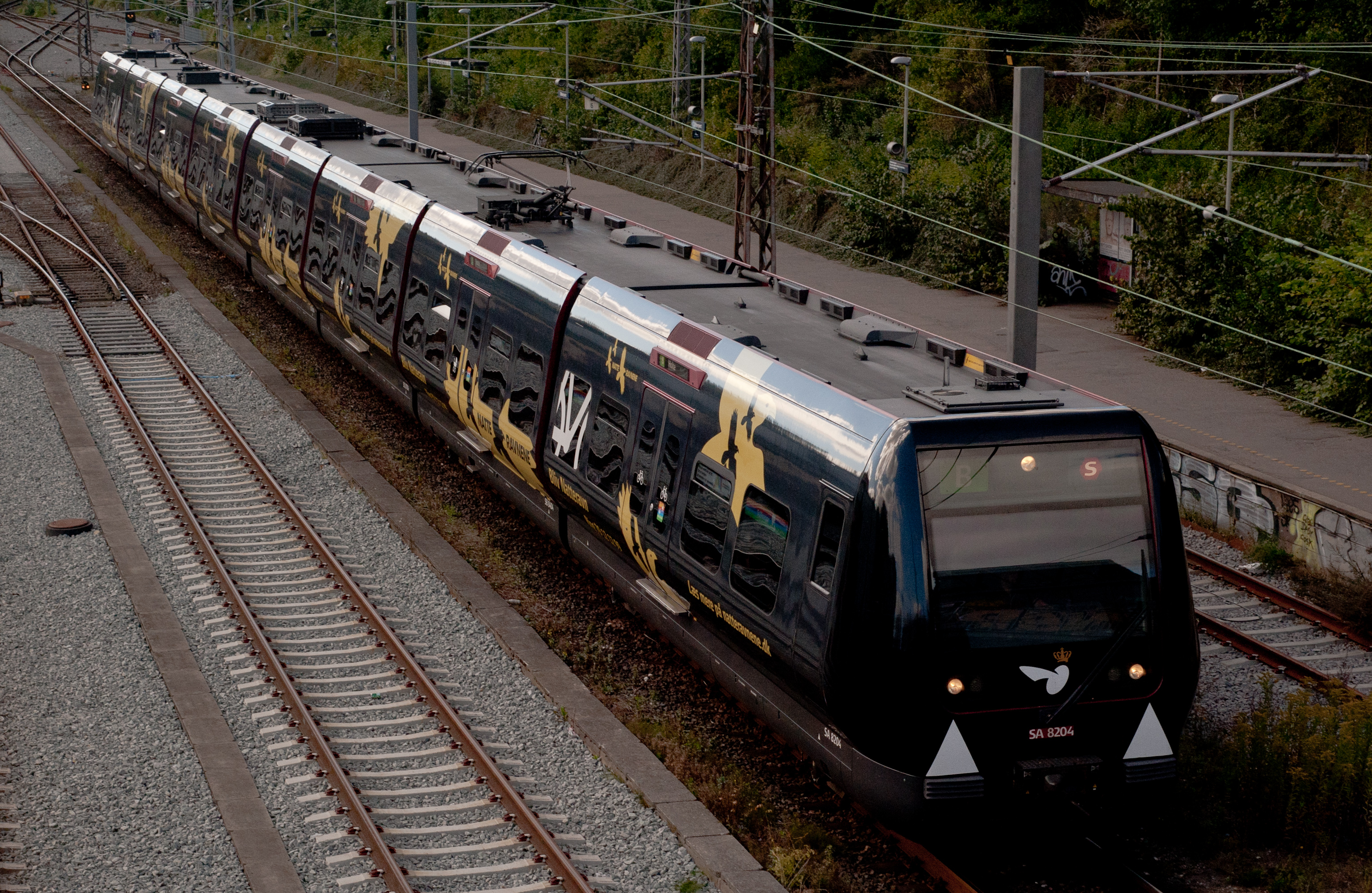
S-train in Denmark with a sponsored wrap advertisement for Natteravnene in Denmark

Natteravnene (English: 'the Night Ravens'), established in 1990, is a Norwegian-based franchise organisation of volunteers that encourages adult, sober citizens to walk around in the city in groups at night during the weekends. Their task is to be visible and available to the public as it is believed that this will prevent violence and anti-social behavior. The volunteers will also assist people who are unable to take care of themselves.

The franchise is inspired by the Nattugglorna, established in 1985 in Karlstad, Sweden, when it was locally recognized in Norway that certain parts of downtown Oslo had become too unsafe for people in general during nighttime. The franchise has since spawned into other parts of Norway as well as having chapters in Denmark, the Faroe Islands, Greenland and Sweden (now under the name Nattevandring.NU). The Danish association had approximately 140 local chapters in 2003. There are also chapters of MC-ravner, where the volunteers ride motorcycles and have a larger range of operation.

In 2019, Natteravnene in Oslo had a total of 259 meetings in downtown Oslo and had around 40 groups.
