= Willumsens Museum =

Coordinates: 55°50′41.2″N 12°3′2.9″E

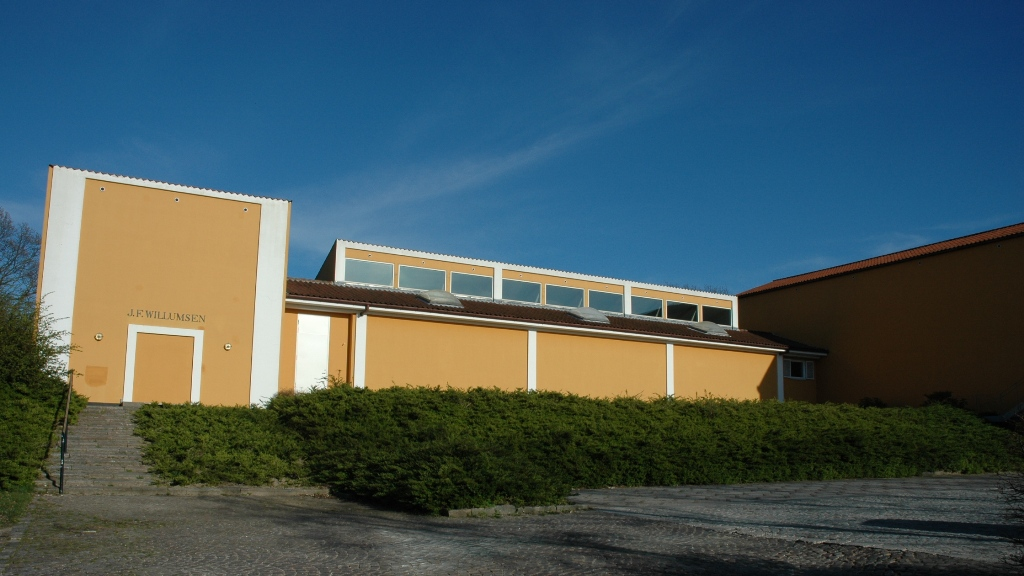
J.F. Willumsen Museum

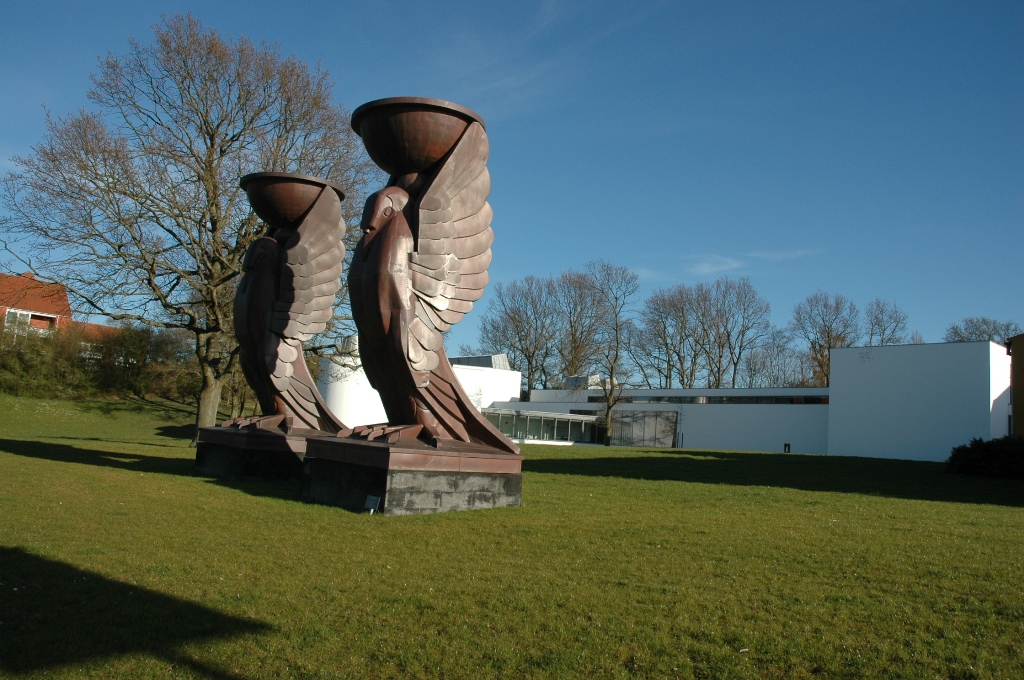
Raven sculpture from Ulvedals Theatre in Dyrehaven

Willumsens Museum is an art museum in Frederikssund dedicated to the Danish visual artist J. F. Willumsen (1863–1958). The museum houses one of the world’s most extensive collections of Willumsen’s works and functions as an art museum, cultural institution, and archive for the artist’s lifelong production.

The museum was founded on the basis of Willumsen’s own donation of artworks, personal archives, and artistic materials to Frederikssund Municipality, which continues to own and operate the museum. Since its opening in 1957, the museum has developed into a central venue for research, dissemination, and exhibitions focusing both on Willumsen and on contemporary art related to his experimental expression.

Art historian Leila Krogh served as the museum’s director from 1973–1990 and again from 1993–2006.

== Collection ==
The museum’s collection spans Willumsen’s entire career and includes:

- Paintings, sculptures, and drawings
- Photographs, ceramics, and prints
- Personal documents, letters, and sketchbooks
- Willumsen's private collection of works by other artists

The collection offers a unique insight into Willumsen’s development from symbolist and naturalist to one of the most distinctive figures in Danish modernism. The museum also holds a large amount of material documenting his working methods, colour experiments, and international networks.

== Building ==
The museum was built in 1957, designed by architect Tyge Hvass, and expanded with an extension in 2005 designed by architect Theo Bjerg. In 2026, Wohlert Arkitekter, known for their work on Louisiana Museum of Modern Art, carried out an extensive renovation and modernisation.

== Exhibitions and activities ==
Willumsens Museum continuously presents changing exhibitions that offer new perspectives on Willumsen’s oeuvre and invite contemporary artists to engage in dialogue with his universe. The museum actively works with:

- special exhibitions
- research projects
- artistic collaborations
- educational activities for children, young people, and adults

The museum has focused on highlighting Willumsen’s experimental approach and placing his work within an international art‑historical context.

Willumsens Museum functions as a regional and national cultural centre, attracting both art professionals and a broad public. The museum works purposefully to:

- strengthen the dissemination of Willumsen’s significance
- create new audience experiences
- engage in local and international collaborations

The museum is an integral part of Frederikssund’s cultural life and contributes actively to the city’s identity and cultural offerings.

== See also ==
- List of single-artist museums
