= N. F. S. Grundtvig =

Danish Lutheran pastor, theologian, hymn-writer and educator (1783–1872)

The Reverend N. F. S. Grundtvig
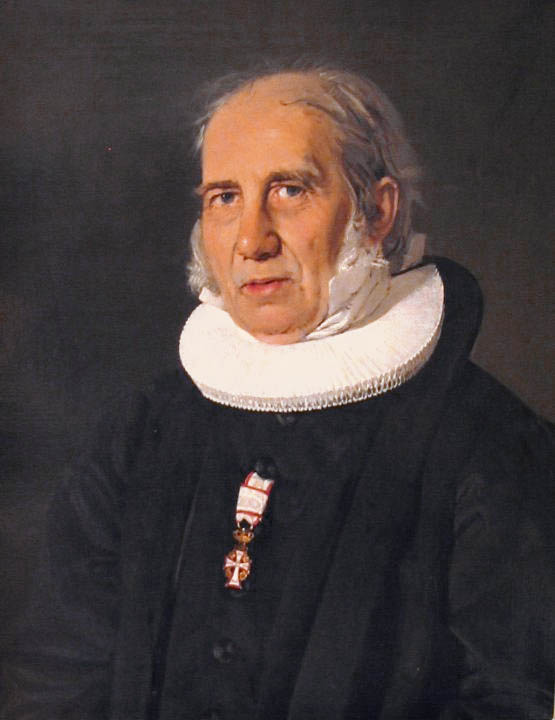
- Grundtvig in pastoral garments
- Born: 8 September 1783; Udby, Zealand, Denmark–Norway
- Died: 2 September 1872 (aged 88); Copenhagen, Denmark
- Occupations: Lutheran minister, teacher, author, poet, philosopher, historian
- Spouse: Elisabeth Christina Margrethe Blicher (Lise Blicher) Ane Marie Elise Toft (Marie Toft) Asta Tugendreich
- Children: Svend Grundtvig
- Mother: Cathrine Marie Bang

Nikolaj Frederik Severin Grundtvig (Danish: [ˈne̝kolɑjˀ ˈfʁeðˀʁek ˈse̝vəʁiˀn ˈkʁɔntviˀ, - ˈfʁæðˀʁæk -]; 8 September 1783 – 2 September 1872), most often referred to as N. F. S. Grundtvig, was a Danish pastor, author, poet, philosopher, historian, teacher and politician. He was one of the most influential people in Danish history, as his philosophy gave rise to a new form of nationalism in the last half of the 19th century. It was steeped in the national literature and supported by deep spirituality.

Grundtvig holds a unique position in the cultural history of his country. Grundtvig and his followers are credited with being very influential in the formulation of modern Danish national consciousness. He was active during the Danish Golden Age, but his style of writing and fields of reference are not immediately accessible to a foreigner, thus his international importance does not match that of his contemporaries Hans Christian Andersen and Søren Kierkegaard.

== Early life and education ==
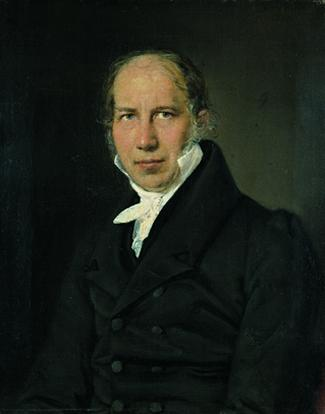
N. F. S. Grundtvig (1831)

Called Frederik rather than Nikolaj by those close to him, N. F. S. Grundtvig was the son of a Lutheran pastor in Udby, Johan Ottosen Grundtvig (1734–1813) and was born there. Grundtvig had three brothers, Otto, Jacob and Niels, and a sister, Ulrike Eleonore. Jacob and Niels died while young priests at Osu Castle in the Danish Gold Coast, while Ulrike Eleonore died from an illness in 1805. Aside from Grundtvig himself, the only other surviving sibling was Otto Grundtvig, who became a priest and later provost in Gladsaxe.

The Children were brought up in a very religious atmosphere, although their mother also had great respect for old Norse legends and traditions. He was schooled in the tradition of the European Enlightenment, but his faith in reason was also influenced by German romanticism and the ancient history of the Nordic countries.

In 1791, when Grundtvig was nine years old, he was sent to Thyregod in Central Jutland to live and study with pastor Laurids Svindt Feld (1750–1803). He subsequently studied at the Aarhus Katedralskole, the cathedral school of Aarhus, from 1798 until graduation. He left for Copenhagen in 1800 to study theology and was accepted to the University of Copenhagen in 1801. At the close of his university life, Grundtvig began to study Icelandic and the Icelandic Sagas.

The young Grundtvig was introverted and socially awkward. He wrote a lot, but nothing he wrote in his earlier years was published in his lifetime.

== Career ==
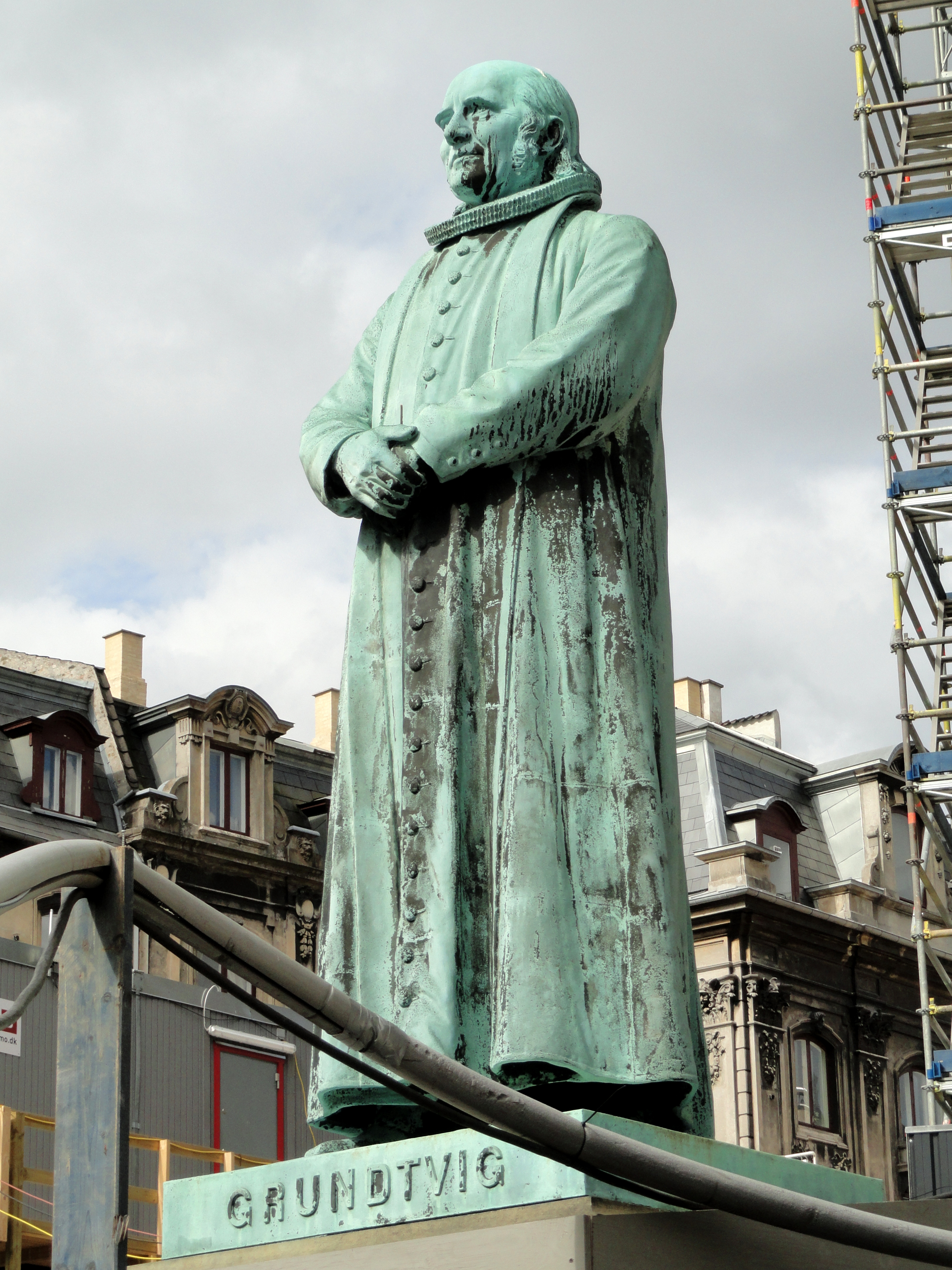
Bronze statue of Grundtvig by Vilhelm Bissen at Frederik's Church

In 1805, Grundtvig took a position as tutor in a house on the island of Langeland. Over the next three years, he used his free time to study the writers Shakespeare, Schiller, and Fichte. Previously, in 1802, his cousin, the philosopher Henrich Steffens, returned to Copenhagen full of the teaching of Friedrich Wilhelm Joseph Schelling. His lectures and the early poetry of Adam Oehlenschläger opened Grundtvig's eyes to the new era in literature. His first work, On the Songs in the Edda, attracted no attention.

Returning to Copenhagen in 1808, Grundtvig achieved greater success with his Northern Mythology, and again in 1809 with a long drama, The Fall of the Heroic Life in the North. Grundtvig boldly denounced the clergy of the city in his first sermon in 1810. When Grundtvig published the sermon three weeks later it offended the ecclesiastical authorities, and they demanded that he be punished.

In 1810, Grundtvig underwent a religious crisis and converted to a strongly held Lutheranism. He retired to his father's country parish in Udby as his chaplain. His new-found conviction was expressed in his The First World Chronicle (Kort Begreb af Verdens Krønike i Sammenhæng) of 1812, a presentation of European history in which he attempted to explain how belief in God has been viewed throughout human history and in which he criticized the ideology of many prominent Danes. It won him notoriety among his peers and cost him several friends, notably the historian Christian Molbech. Upon his father's death in 1813, Grundtvig applied to be his successor in the parish but was rejected.

In the following years his rate of publication was staggering: aside from a continuing stream of articles and poems, he wrote a number of books, including two more histories of the world (1814 and 1817); the long historical poem Roskilde-Riim (Rhyme of Roskilde; 1813); and a book-sized commentary, Roskilde Saga. From 1816 to 1819 he was editor of and almost sole contributor to a philosophical and polemical journal entitled Danne-Virke, which also published poetry.

From 1813 to 1815, he attempted to form a movement to support the Norwegians against the Swedish government. Later he preached on how the weakness of the Danish faith was the cause of the loss of Norway in 1814. His sermon was met by an enthusiastic congregation in Copenhagen. Grundtvig withdrew from the pulpit because he did not have a parish of his own and was being barred by other churches. In 1821, he resumed preaching briefly when granted the country living of Præstø, and returned to the capital the year after.

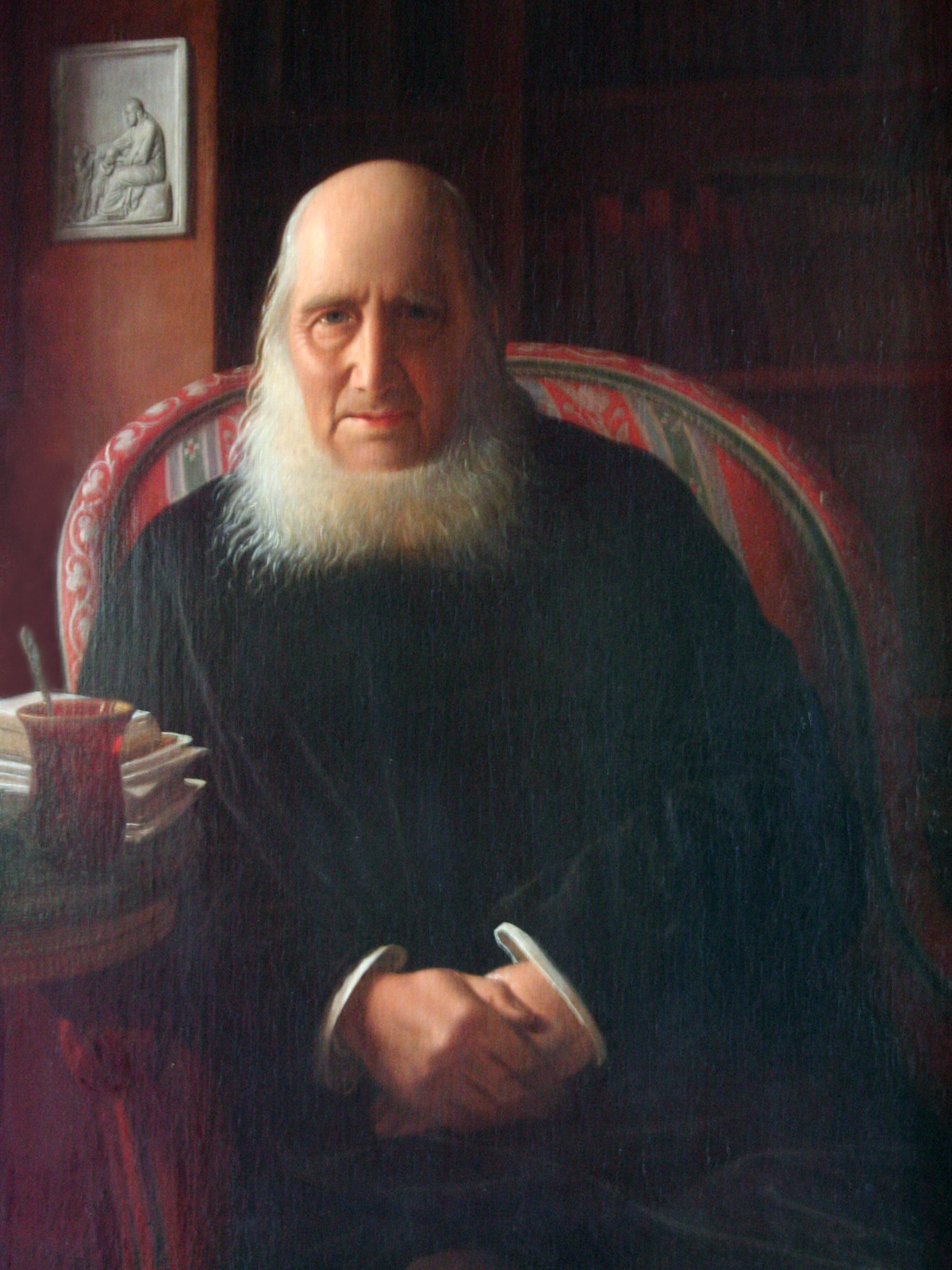
N. F. S. Grundtvig by Constantin Hansen

In 1825, Grundtvig published a pamphlet, The Church's Rejoinder (Kirkens Gienmæle), a response to Henrik Nicolai Clausen's work on the doctrines, rites, and constitutions of Protestantism and Roman Catholicism. A professor of theology at the University of Copenhagen, Clausen argued that although the Bible was the principal foundation of Christianity, it was in itself an inadequate expression of its full meaning. He described the church as a "community for the purpose of advancing general religiousness". In his reply, Grundtvig denounced Clausen as an anti-Christian teacher and argued that Christianity was not a theory to be derived from the Holy Bible and elaborated by scholars. He questioned the right of theologians to interpret the Bible. Grundtvig was publicly prosecuted for libel and fined. The Church of Denmark forbade him to preach for seven years. During this time he published a collection of theological works, visited England three times (1829–31), and studied Anglo-Saxon.

In 1832, Grundtvig obtained permission to enter active ministry again. In 1839, he was called as pastor of the workhouse church of Vartov hospital in Copenhagen, a post he held until his death. Between 1837 and 1841 he published Sang-Værk til den Danske Kirke (Song Work for the Danish Church), a rich collection of sacred poetry; in 1838 he brought out a selection of early Scandinavian verse; in 1840 he edited the Anglo-Saxon poem "The Phoenix", with a Danish translation. In 1843 he visited England for a fourth time.

From 1844 until after the First Schleswig War, Grundtvig took a prominent part in politics, developing from a conservative into an absolute liberal. In 1848 he was part of the Danish Constituent Assembly that wrote the first constitution of Denmark. In 1861 he received the titular rank of Bishop in the Church of Denmark, but without a see. He continued to write and publish until his death. He spoke from the pulpit at Vartov Church every Sunday until a few days before his death. His preaching attracted large congregations, and he soon had a following. His hymn book effected a great change in Danish church services, substituting the hymns of the national poets for the slow measures of the orthodox Lutherans. In all Grundtvig wrote or translated about 1500 hymns, including "God's Word Is Our Great Heritage" and "Det kimer nu til julefest".

== Christian thinking ==
Grundtvig's theological development continued over his lifetime, and took a number of important turns. He moved from his "Christian awakening" of 1810 to believing in a congregational and sacramental Christianity in later years. He was most notable for the latter thinking. He always called himself a pastor, not a theologian, reflecting the distance between his ideas and academic theology. The chief characteristic of his theology was the substitution of the authority of the "living word" for the apostolic commentaries. He desired to see each congregation act as a practically independent community.

Even though he was a staunch Christian, Grundtvig's obsession with the pre-Christian Scandinavian faith lasted throughout his life. At the time this faith had no official name, but were merely known as "Forn Siðr" - "the old customs". Therefore as part of his studies and works on this old faith, he coined the name "Asatro" or "Asetro", a name which holds a double meaning. The meaning can either be interpretated as "the Aesir faith" or "loyal to the Aesir".

== Thought on education ==
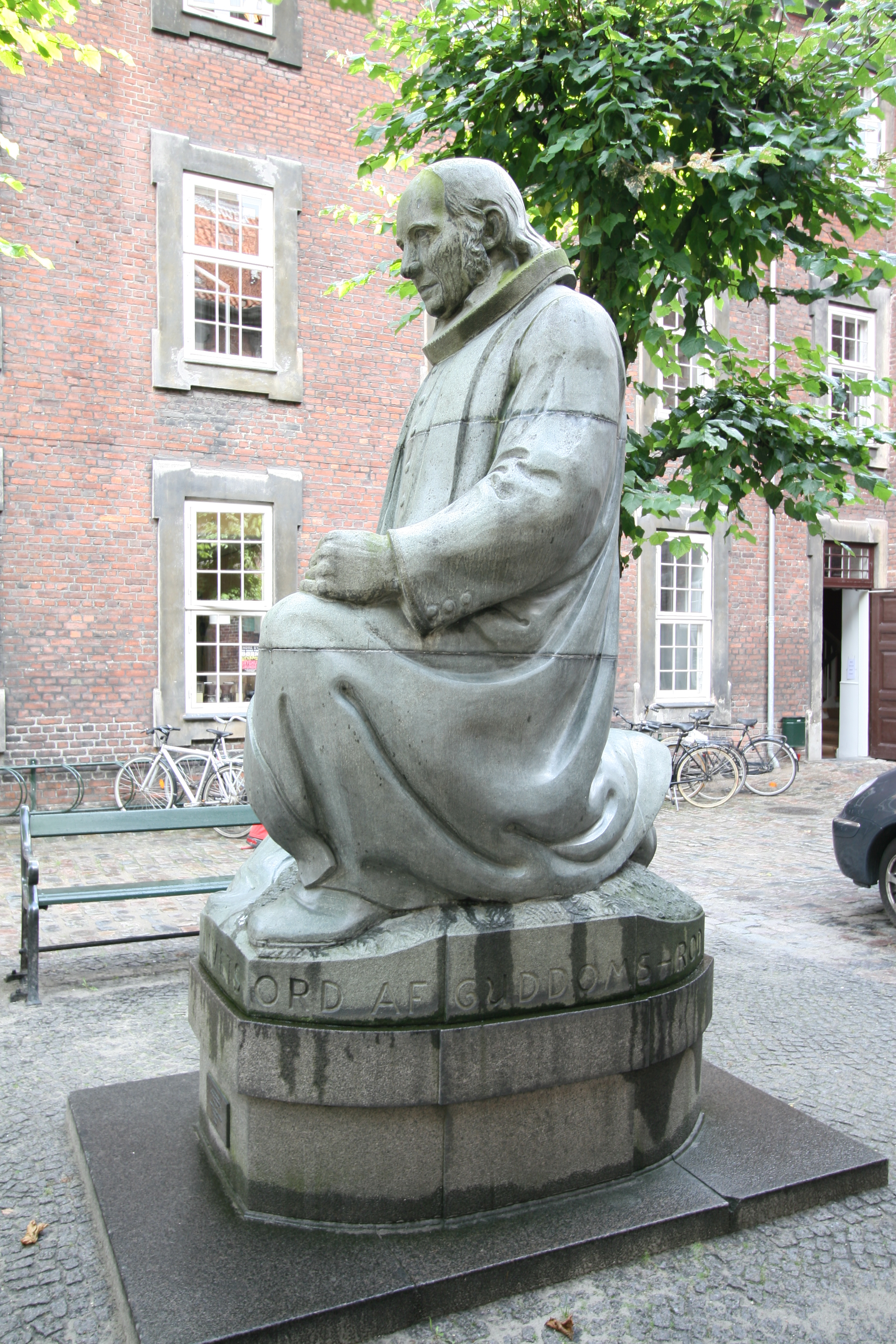
Sculpture of Grundtvig in Vartov (Grundtvigsk Forum) by Niels Skovgaard

Grundtvig is the ideological father of the folk high school, though his own ideas on education had another focus. He advocated reforming the ailing Sorø Academy into a popular school aiming at another form of higher education than what was common at the university. Rather than educating learned scholars, he believed the university should educate its students for active participation in society and popular life. Thus practical skills as well as national poetry and history should form an essential part of the instruction. This idea came very close to implementation during the reign of King Christian VIII, whose wife Caroline Amalie was an ardent supporter of Grundtvig. The death of the monarch in 1848 and the dramatic political development in Denmark during this and the following years put an end to these plans. However, by that time, one of Grundtvig's supporters, Kristen Kold, had already established the first folk high school.

Grundtvig's ambitions for school reform were not limited to the popular folk high school. He also dreamed of forming a Great Nordic University (the School for Passion) to be situated at the symbolic point of intersection between the three Scandinavian countries in Gothenburg, Sweden. The two pillars of his school program, the School for Life (folk high school) and the School for Passion (university) were aimed at quite different horizons of life. The popular education should mainly be taught within a national and patriotic horizon of understanding, yet always keeping an open mind towards a broader cultural and intercultural outlook, while the university should work from a strictly universal, i.e. humane and scientific, outlook.

The common denominator of all Grundtvig's pedagogical efforts was to promote a spirit of freedom, poetry and disciplined creativity, within all branches of educational life. He promoted values such as wisdom, compassion, identification and equality. He opposed all compulsion, including exams, as deadening to the human soul. Instead Grundtvig advocated unleashing human creativity according to the universally creative order of life. Only willing hands make light work. Therefore, a spirit of freedom, cooperation and discovery was to be kindled in individuals, in science, and in the civil society as a whole.

== Beowulf and Anglo-Saxon literature ==
In 1815, Grímur Jónsson Thorkelin published the first edition of the Epic of Beowulf titled De Danorum rebus gestis secul. III & IV : Poëma Danicum dialecto Anglosaxonica in a Latin translation. Despite his lack of knowledge of Anglo-Saxon literature, Grundtvig quickly discovered a number of flaws in Thorkelin's rendering of the poems. After his heated debate with Thorkelin, Johan Bülow (1751–1828), who had sponsored Thorkelin's work, offered to support a new translation by Grundtvig — this time into Danish. The result, Bjovulfs Drape (1820), was the first full translation of Beowulf into a modern language (previously, only selections of the poem had been translated into modern English by Sharon Turner in 1805).

Grundtvig went on to explore the extensive literature of the Anglo-Saxons which survived in Old English and Latin. In both poetry and prose, it revealed the spirituality of the early Church in Northern Europe. Grundtvig was very influenced by these ancient models of Christian and historical thought (notably the 8th-century Bede's Ecclesiastical History, written in Latin). Using the resources of the Royal Library in Copenhagen and of the libraries at the universities of Exeter, Oxford, and Cambridge in three successive summer visits to England (1829–1831), he went on to make transcriptions of two of the four great codices of Anglo-Saxon poetry: the Exeter Book and the codex designated Junius 11 in the Bodleian Library at Oxford. Although he thought to publish them, the project was never realized. Beowulf and Anglo-Saxon literature continued to be a major source of inspiration to Grundtvig. It had a wide-ranging influence upon his work.

== Marriage and family ==
Grundtvig was married three times, the last time in his 76th year. His first wife, Elisabeth Blicher (1787–1851), was a clergyman's daughter. They were married in 1818 and had three children. His second wife, Marie Toft (1813–1854) was the daughter of a landowner. She died a few months after giving birth to a son. In 1858, he married Asta Reedtz (1826–1890) of an old aristocratic Danish family. His son Svend Grundtvig (1824–1883) collected and edited Danish ballads.

== Legacy ==
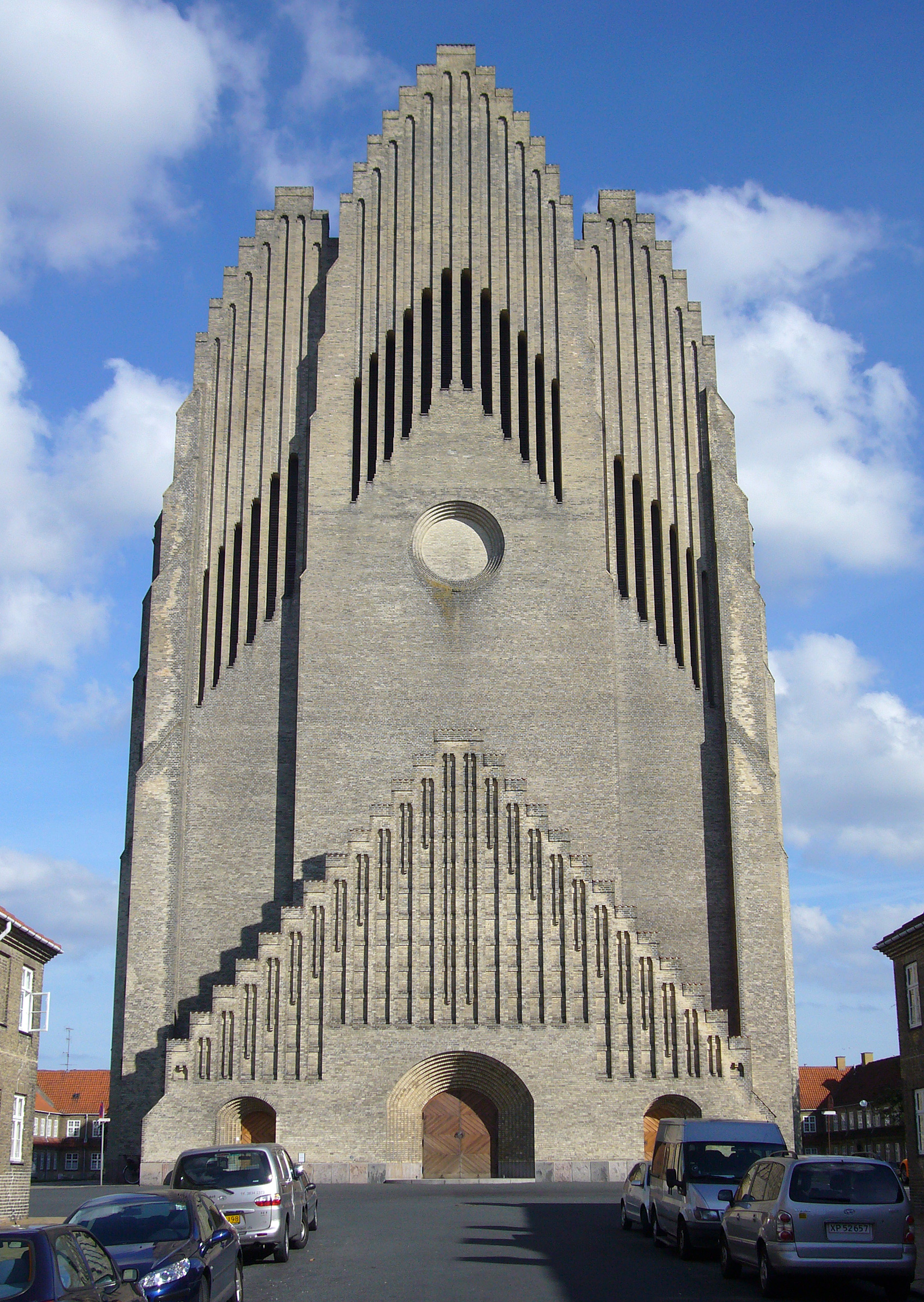
Grundtvig's Church

- Grundtvig's Church in the Copenhagen district of Bispebjerg was designed by Danish architect Peder Vilhelm Jensen-Klint as a memorial to Grundtvig. Built of yellow brick in a Neo-Gothic expressionist style, it was completed in 1940.
- Grundtvig International Secondary School in Nigeria is also named after him, It is an independent co-educational secondary School.
- His hymn De Levendes Land was chosen in 2006 as an item in the Lyrikantologi which forms part of the Literature section of the Danish Culture Canon.
- Grundtvigian Forum is located at Vartov in central Copenhagen. Founded during 1898, it is a religious movement with a background in Grundtvigianism.

A granite statue by Niels Skovgaard was installed in the central courtyard of Vartorv in 1932. It depicts Grundtvig kneeling by the Spring of Life.

== Veneration ==
Grundtvig is commemorated on 2 September as a renewer of the church in the Calendar of Saints of the Evangelical Lutheran Church in America.

== Bibliography ==
=== Editions ===
No comprehensive foreign language edition of his work exists. A three-volume edition in German, however, is under preparation and projects for an English edition are in progress as well. Grundtvig's secular poetical works were published in a nine-volume edition, the first seven volumes by his second son, the philologist Svend Grundtvig. The philological practice of this work, however, is not up to the standards of modern philology. His hymns have been collected in the philologically more stable five-volume edition Grundtvigs Sang-Værk.

One notable collection of his writings in print is the ten-volume edition Grundtvigs udvalgte Skrifter edited by Holger Begtrup (1859–1937). His enormous oeuvre is presented in Steen Johansen: Bibliografi over N.F.S. Grundtvigs Skrifter (I-IV, 1948–54).

The most important editions are:

- Grundtvigs Værker. Center for Grundtvigforskning (editors), Aarhus Universitet. 2010-.
- Grundtvigs Sang-Værk 1–6. Magnus Stevns (and others, editors). Copenhagen: Det danske Forlag. 1948–64.
- Poetiske Skrifter 1–9. Udgivet af Svend Grundtvig (and others, editors). Copenhagen: Karl Schönberg og Hyldendal. 1880–1930.
- Udvalgte Skrifter 1–10. Holger Begtrup (editor). Copenhagen: Gyldendal. 1904–09.
- Værker i Udvalg 1–10. Hal Koch and Georg Christensen (editors). Copenhagen: Gyldendal. 1940–46.

=== English translations ===
- N.F.S. Grundtvig: A Life Recalled. An Anthology of Biographical Source-Texts.Edited and translated by S.A.J. Bradley. Aarhus: Aarhus University Press. 2008.
- The School for Life. N.F.S. Grundtvig on Education for the People. Translated by Edward Broadbridge. Aarhus: Aarhus University Press. 2011.
- Living Wellsprings: The Hymns, Songs and Poems of N.F.S. Grundtvig. Translated by Edward Broadbridge. Aarhus: Aarhus University Press. 2015. ISBN 9788771247947
- Human Comes First. The Christian Theology of N.F.S. Grundtvig. Translated by. Aarhus: Aarhus University Press. 2018. ISBN 9788771841350
- The Common Good: N.F.S. Grundtvig as Politician and Contemporary Historian. Translated by Edward Broadbridge. Aarhus: Aarhus University Press. 2019 ISBN 9788771848311

=== Bibliography ===
- Abrahamowitz, Finn (2000), Grundtvig Danmark til lykke (in Danish), Copenhagen: Høst & Søns Forlag, ISBN 87-14-29612-8.
- Allchin, Arthur Macdonald (1997), NFS Grundtvig, Århus: Århus University Press, ISBN 87-7288-656-0.
- Reich, Ebbe Kløvedal (2000), Solskin og Lyn — Grundtvig og hans sang til livet (in Danish), Copenhagen: Forlaget Vartov, ISBN 87-87389-00-2.
- Johansen, Steen (1948–54), Bibliografi over NFS Grundtvigs Skrifter 1–4, Copenhagen: Gyldendal.
