= Lars von Trier filmography =

This article presents the filmography of Lars von Trier.

== Filmography ==
Year	Title	Also known as	Director	Screenwriter	Actor	Notes
1982	Images of Liberation	(Befrielsesbilleder)^{[1]}	Yes	Yes	No	Student film
1984	The Element of Crime^{[2]}	(Forbrydelsens element)^{[1]}	Yes	Yes	Yes	Actor: Schmuck of Ages
1987	Epidemic^{[2]}		Yes	Yes	Yes	Actor: Fictionalised version of himself Also editor
1988	Medea		Yes	No	No	Television film
1991	Europa^{[2]}	(Zentropa)	Yes	Yes	Yes	Actor: Jew
1994	The Kingdom^{[6]}	(Riget)^{[1]}	Yes	Yes	Yes	Television miniseries Creator, co-directed with Morten Arnfred; Actor: Himself (uncredited); Lyricist: "Main Theme"
1996	Breaking the Waves^{[3]}		Yes	Yes	No	
1997	The Kingdom II^{[6]}	(Riget II)^{[1]}	Yes	Yes	Yes	Television miniseries Creator, co-directed with Morten Arnfred; Actor: Himself (uncredited); Lyricist: "Main Theme"
1998	The Idiots^{[3]}	(Idioterne)^{[1]}	Yes	Yes	Yes	Actor: Interviewer; Also cinematography (all uncredited)
2000	Dancer in the Dark^{[3]}		Yes	Yes	No	
2000	D-Day	(D-dag)^{[1]}	Yes	Yes	No	Television anthology film Segment: Lise
2003	Dogville^{[4]}		Yes	Yes	No	
2003	The Five Obstructions	(De fem benspænd)	Yes	Yes	Yes	Actor: Himself
2004	Dear Wendy		No	Yes	No	
2005	Manderlay^{[4]}		Yes	Yes	No	
2006	The Boss of It All	(Direktøren for det hele)^{[1]}	Yes	Yes	Yes	Actor: Narrator (uncredited); Also cinematography
2007	The Early Years: Erik Nietzsche Part 1	(De unge år: Erik Nietzsche sagaen del 1)^{[1]}	No	Yes	Yes	Actor: Narrator
2007	To Each His Own Cinema	(Chacun son cinéma)^{[1]}	Yes	Yes	Yes	Actor: Himself; Segment: Occupations
2009	Antichrist^{[5]}		Yes	Yes	No	
2010	Dimension		Yes	Yes	No	Unfinished
2011	Melancholia^{[5]}		Yes	Yes	No	
2013	Nymphomaniac^{[5]}		Yes	Yes	No	
2018	The House That Jack Built		Yes	Yes	No	
2022	The Kingdom: Exodus^{[6]}	(Riget: Exodus)^{[1]}	Yes	Yes	Yes	Television miniseries Creator, Actor: Himself / Satan (uncredited); Lyricist: "Main Theme"

=== Short films ===
Year	Title
1967	Turen til Squashland
1968	Nat, skat
1969	En røvsyg oplevelse
1969	Et skakspil
1970	Hvorfor flygte fra det du ved du ikke kan flygte fra? Fordi du er en kujon
1971	En blomst
1977	The Orchid Gardener (Orchidégartneren)^{[1]}
1979	Menthe: La bienheureuse
1980	Nocturne
1981	The Last Detail (Den sidste detalje)^{[1]}

=== Video games ===
Year	Title	Role	Developer
Cancelled	Eden	Writer, based on a 2009 film Antichrist	Zentropa Games

=== Additional credits ===
Year	Title	Notes
1969	Secret Summer	Television series Actor: Lars Johansen (8 episodes)
1994	The Teacher's Room	Talk-show, creator and co-directed with Rumle Hammerich
1999-2000	By The Quiet Stream	TV series, executive and creative producer

== Notes ==
- 1 These are the original titles that the films and miniseries were given.
- 2 The Element of Crime, Epidemic and Europa are, respectively, the first, second and third part of the film trilogy Europa.
- 3 Breaking the Waves, The Idiots and Dancer in the Dark are, respectively, the first, second and third part of the film trilogy Golden Heart.
- 4 Dogville, Manderlay and the so-far-unmade Washington are, respectively, the first, second and third part of the film trilogy USA: Land of Opportunities.
- 5 Antichrist, Melancholia and Nymphomaniac are, respectively, the first, second and third part of the film trilogy Depression.
- 6 Riget, Riget II and Riget Exodus are, respectively, the first, second and third part of the miniseries trilogy Riget.
