= Trilogy =

Set of three works of art that are connected

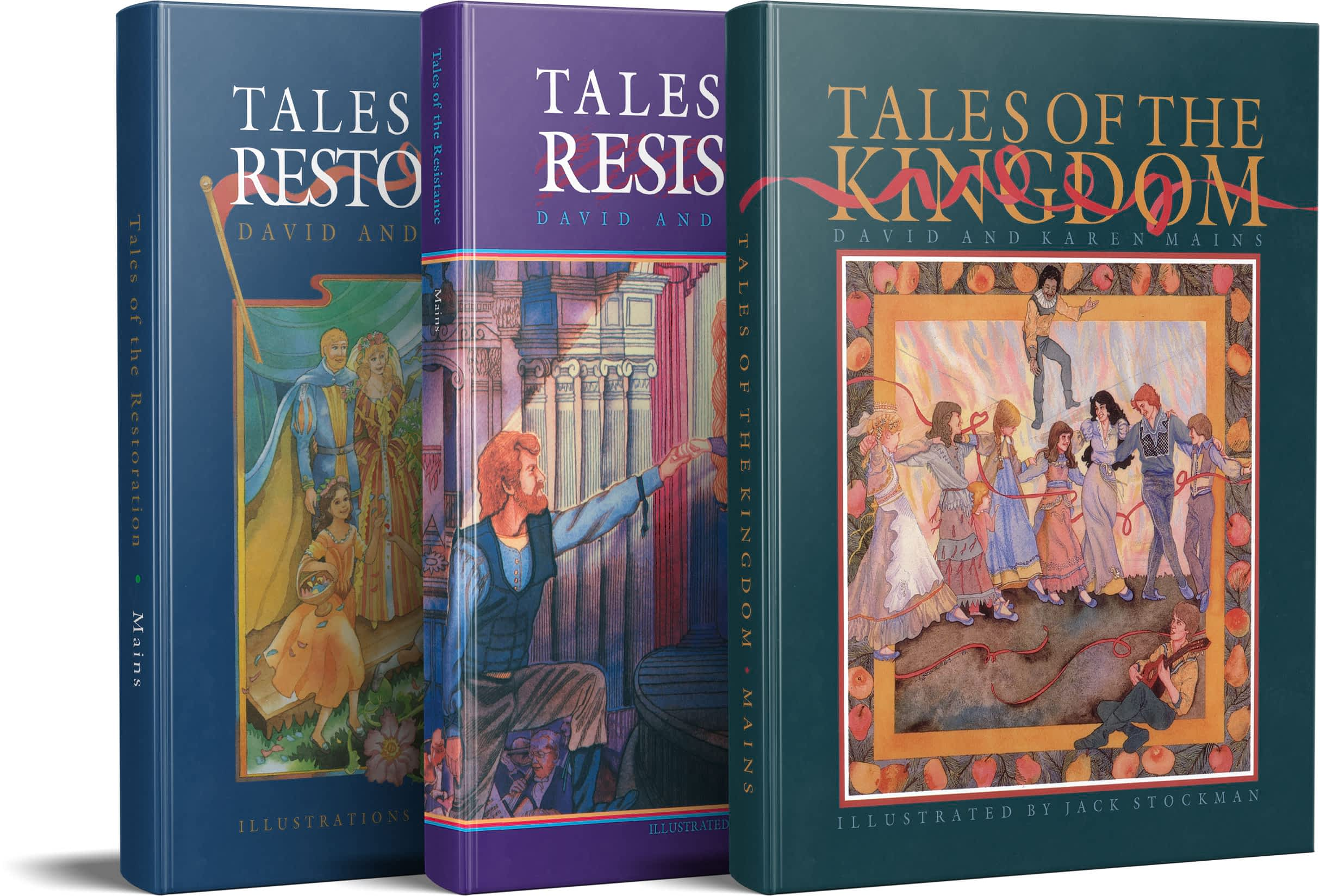
Tales of the Kingdom Trilogy Classic Edition

A trilogy is a set of three distinct works that are connected and can be seen either as a single work or as three individual works. They are commonly found in literature, film, and video games. Three-part works that are considered components of a larger work also exist, such as the triptych or the three-movement sonata, but they are not commonly referred to with the term "trilogy".

Most trilogies are works of fiction involving the same characters or setting, such as The Deptford Trilogy of novels by Robertson Davies, The Apu Trilogy of films by Satyajit Ray, and The Kingdom Trilogy of television miniseries by Lars von Trier. Other fiction trilogies are connected only by theme: for example, each film of Krzysztof Kieślowski's Three Colours trilogy explores one of the political ideals of the French Republic (liberty, equality, fraternity). Trilogies can also be connected in less obvious ways, such as The Nova Trilogy of novels by William S. Burroughs, each written using cut-up technique.

The term is seldom applied outside media. One example is the "Marshall Trilogy", a common term for three rulings written by U.S. Supreme Court Chief Justice John Marshall from 1823 to 1832 concerning the legal status of Native Americans under U.S. law.

== History ==
Trilogies (Ancient Greek: τριλογία trilogia) date back to ancient times. In the Dionysia festivals of ancient Greece, for example, trilogies of plays were performed followed by a fourth satyr play. The Oresteia is the only surviving trilogy of these ancient Greek plays, originally performed at the festival in Athens in 458 BC. The three Theban plays, or Oedipus cycle, by Sophocles, originating in 5th century BC, is not a true example of a trilogy because the plays were written at separate times and with different themes/purposes.

Technical changes in printing and film in the mid-to-late 20th century made the creation of trilogies more feasible, while the development of mass media and modern global distribution networks has made them more likely to be lucrative. Examples of trilogies in modern fiction include the August trilogy by Knut Hamsun, the Cairo Trilogy by Naguib Mahfouz, The Border Trilogy by Cormac McCarthy, and His Dark Materials by Philip Pullman. A pivotal example is J. R. R. Tolkien's The Lord of the Rings (1954–1955), which was written as a single novel but published for economic reasons as three separate novels with distinct titles, thus helping to popularize the trilogy format.

== In media ==
=== Films ===
The increase in sequels in recent years means there are a number of franchises that have produced three films, often with II and III appended to their title as an indication. Less obvious film trilogies include:

- Lars von Trier has occasionally referred to his films as falling into thematic and stylistic trilogies; about the apocalyptic subject matters in Europa trilogy (The Element of Crime (1984), Epidemic (1987), and Europa (1991)); the heroine's tragedies in Golden Heart trilogy (Breaking the Waves (1996), The Idiots (1998), and Dancer in the Dark (2000)); the anti-American culture in USA: Land of Opportunities, Dogville (2003) and Manderlay (2005)); and the Depression trilogy (Antichrist (2009), Melancholia (2011), and Nymphomaniac (2013)).
- The Before trilogy consists of three American romance films created by Richard Linklater and starring Ethan Hawke and Julie Delpy, who both co-wrote the two sequels. It begins with Before Sunrise (1995), and continues with Before Sunset (2004) and Before Midnight (2013).
- The Death trilogy consists of three psychological drama films about the human condition and intertwined plots with different characters: Amores perros (2000), 21 Grams (2003) and Babel (2006), all directed by Alejandro González Iñárritu and written by Guillermo Arriaga.

=== Music ===
The term is less often applied to music.

- One example is the Berlin Trilogy of David Bowie, which is linked together by musical sound and lyrical themes, all having been recorded at least partly in Berlin, Germany.
- Another example can be found in the Guns N' Roses songs "November Rain", "Don't Cry" and "Estranged", whose videos are considered a trilogy.
- The Unforgiven (Trilogy) is the name given to the three homonymous songs by the group Metallica, which have been included on the albums Metallica The Unforgiven (1991), ReLoad The Unforgiven II (1997) and Death Magnetic The Unforgiven III (2008), therefore, the song The Unforgiven has spawned two sequels.
- The Weeknd's 2012 compilation album Trilogy is a remastered and remixed collection of his 2011 mixtapes House of Balloons, Thursday, and Echoes of Silence.
- Another highly notable musical trilogy is Green Day's 2012 albums ¡Uno!, ¡Dos!, and ¡Tré!.
- Another trilogy is Beyoncé's trilogy of albums, Act I: Renaissance, Act II: Cowboy Carter, and the incoming Act III.

=== Video games ===
- The N. Sane Trilogy, released between 1996 and 1999, consists of Crash Bandicoot (1996), Cortex Strikes Back (1997), and Warped (1998), which were originally developed by Naughty Dog for the PlayStation. This resulted to remaster into a collection titled Crash Bandicoot N. Sane Trilogy, but not affiliated with Naughty Dog.
- The Lisa Trilogy was released between 2012 and 2015, developed by Dingaling Productions, with each of the three games (The First, The Painful, and The Joyful) having different apocalyptic settings and playable protagonists, and themes of transgenerational trauma and child abuse.
- The Mother trilogy is a video game series that consists of three role-playing video games: Mother (1989), known as EarthBound Beginnings outside Japan, for the Family Computer; Mother 2 (1994), known as EarthBound outside Japan, for the Super Nintendo Entertainment System; and Mother 3 (2006) for the Game Boy Advance.

== Adding works to an existing trilogy ==
Creators of trilogies may later add more works. In such a case, the original three works may or may not keep the title "trilogy".

- The first three novels in The Hitchhiker's Guide to the Galaxy series were dubbed a trilogy and even after he extended the series, author Douglas Adams continued to use the term for humorous effect—for example, calling Mostly Harmless "the fifth book in the increasingly inaccurately named trilogy."
- Kevin Smith's films Clerks, Mallrats and Chasing Amy were often marketed as "The New Jersey Trilogy" because they had overlapping characters, events and locations. After the release of a fourth film, Dogma, the series is referred to as "the View Askewniverse".
- The Star Wars trilogy, released between 1977 and 1983, has since been expanded into a trilogy of trilogies, which have since been titled the "Skywalker Saga": the original trilogy, the prequel trilogy released between 1999 and 2005, and the sequel trilogy released between 2015 and 2019. More movies and television series in the Star Wars franchise were also developed.
- The Pirates of the Caribbean series began with the first three films released between 2003 and 2007, The Curse of the Black Pearl, Dead Man's Chest, and At World's End. Although the Pirates series continued with fourth and fifth films, On Stranger Tides and Dead Men Tell No Tales, the term "Pirates of the Caribbean trilogy" was still used in most media and reports online, including in an interview with director Gore Verbinski.

== See also ==
- List of feature film series with three entries
- Numeral prefix
- Trifecta
- Tritheism
- Tetralogy
