= List of awards and nominations received by Lars von Trier =

List of Awards and Nominations

Lars von Trier awards and nominations
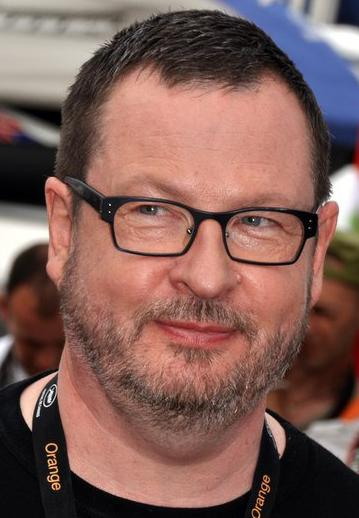
- Trier at the 2011 Cannes Film Festival
Awards and nominations
Award	Wins	Nominations
Academy Awards	0	1
Bodil Awards	7	11
Cannes Film Festival	6	14
César Awards	1	4
European Film Awards	5	14
Golden Globes	0	1
Goya Awards	1	4
Independent Spirit Awards	1	3
Robert Awards	15	26
Other Awards	62	101
- Totals
Awards won	98
Nominations	179

The following is a list of awards and nominations received by Danish director and screenwriter Lars von Trier. Among the many accolades he received over the years, von Trier has won five European Film Awards, a César Award, a Palme d'Or, and has been nominated for an Academy Award and a Golden Globe. In his home country of Denmark, he has won seven Bodil Awards and fifteen Robert Awards.

== Organizations ==
=== AACTA Awards ===
Year	Nominated work	Category	Result	Ref.
2012	Melancholia	Best Direction – International	Nominated	
2012	Melancholia	Best Screenplay – International	Nominated	

=== Academy Awards ===
Year	Nominated work	Category	Result	Ref.
2001	"I've Seen It All" (from Dancer in the Dark)	Best Original Song	Nominated	

=== Bodil Awards ===
Year	Nominated work	Category	Result	Ref.
1985	Forbrydelsens element	Best Danish Film	Won	
1992	Europa	Best Danish Film	Won	
1995	Riget	Best Danish Film	Won	
1997	Breaking the Waves	Best Danish Film	Won	
1999	Idioterne	Best Danish Film	Nominated	
2001	Dancer in the Dark	Best Danish Film	Nominated	
2004	Dogville	Best Danish Film	Won	
2006	Manderlay	Best Danish Film	Nominated	
2010	Antichrist	Best Danish Film	Won	
2012	Melancholia	Best Danish Film	Won	
2014	Nymphomaniac	Best Danish Film	Nominated	
2025	—N/a	Honorary Award	Won	

=== César Awards ===
Year	Nominated work	Category	Result	Ref.
1997	Breaking the Waves	Best Foreign Film	Won	
2001	Dancer in the Dark	Best Foreign Film	Nominated	
2004	Dogville	Best Film from the European Union	Nominated	
2012	Melancholia	Best Foreign Film	Nominated	

=== David di Donatello Awards ===
Year	Nominated work	Category	Result	Ref.
2004	Dogville	Best European Film	Won	
2012	Melancholia	Best European Film	Nominated	

=== European Film Awards ===
Year	Nominated work	Category	Result	Ref.
1996	Breaking the Waves	Critics Award (FIPRESCI Award)	Won	
1998	Idioterne	Best Screenwriter	Nominated	
2000	Dancer in the Dark	Audience Award	Won	
2003	Dogville	Best Director	Won	
2003	Dogville	Best Screenwriter	Nominated	
2003	Dogville	Audience Award	Nominated	
2003	De fem benspænd	Best Documentary	Nominated	
2008	—N/a	Outstanding European Achievement in World Cinema (with Thomas Vinterberg, Kristian Levring and Søren Kragh-Jacobsen)	Won	
2009	Antichrist	Best Director	Nominated	
2011	Melancholia	Best Film	Won	
2011	Melancholia	Best Director	Nominated	
2011	Melancholia	Best Screenwriter	Nominated	
2014	Nymphomaniac	Best Film	Nominated	
2014	Nymphomaniac	Audience Award	Nominated	

=== Golden Globe Awards ===
Year	Nominated work	Category	Result	Ref.
2001	"I've Seen It All" (from Dancer in the Dark)	Best Original Song	Nominated	

=== Gopo Awards ===
Year	Nominated work	Category	Result	Ref.
2011	Antichrist	Best European Film	Nominated	
2012	Melancholia	Best European Film	Won	
2015	Nymphomaniac	Best European Film	Nominated	

=== Goya Awards ===
Year	Nominated work	Category	Result	Ref.
1997	Breaking the Waves	Best European Film	Nominated	
2001	Dancer in the Dark	Best European Film	Won	
2004	Dogville	Best European Film	Nominated	
2012	Melancholia	Best European Film	Nominated	

=== Independent Spirit Awards ===
Year	Nominated work	Category	Result	Ref.
1997	Breaking the Waves	Best Foreign Film	Nominated	
2001	Dancer in the Dark	Best Foreign Film	Won	
2012	Melancholia	Best International Film	Nominated	

=== Robert Awards ===
Year	Nominated work	Category	Result	Ref.
1985	Forbrydelsens element	Best Danish Film	Won	
1992	Europa	Best Danish Film	Won	
1995	Riget	Best Screenplay	Won	
1997	Breaking the Waves	Best Danish Film	Won	
1997	Breaking the Waves	Best Screenplay	Won	
2001	Dancer in the Dark	Best Director	Nominated	
2004	Dogville	Best Danish Film	Nominated	
2004	Dogville	Best Director	Nominated	
2004	Dogville	Best Screenplay	Won	
2006	Manderlay	Best Danish Film	Nominated	
2006	Manderlay	Best Director	Nominated	
2006	Manderlay	Best Screenplay	Nominated	
2007	Direktøren for det hele	Best Screenplay	Nominated	
2010	Antichrist	Best Danish Film	Won	
2010	Antichrist	Best Director	Won	
2010	Antichrist	Best Screenplay	Won	
2012	Melancholia	Best Danish Film	Won	
2012	Melancholia	Best Director	Won	
2012	Melancholia	Best Screenplay	Won	
2015	Nymphomaniac	Best Danish Film	Won	
2015	Nymphomaniac	Best Director	Won	
2015	Nymphomaniac	Best Original Screenplay	Won	
2015	Nymphomaniac	Audience Award	Nominated	
2019	The House That Jack Built	Best Danish Film	Nominated	
2019	The House That Jack Built	Best Director	Nominated	
2019	The House That Jack Built	Best Original Screenplay	Nominated	

=== Satellite Awards ===
Year	Nominated work	Category	Result	Ref.
1997	Breaking the Waves	Best Foreign Language Film	Won	
1997	Breaking the Waves	Best Director	Nominated	
2001	"I've Seen It All" (from Dancer in the Dark)	Best Original Song	Won	

=== Other awards ===
Year	Award	Nominated work	Result	Ref.
1996	Grimme-Preis for Best Series or Miniseries	Riget	Won	
1996	Amanda Award for Best Nordic Feature Film	Breaking the Waves	Won	
1998	Czech Lion for Best Foreign Language Film	Breaking the Waves	Won	
2001	Blue Ribbon Award for Best Foreign Language Film	Dancer in the Dark	Won	
2008	Nordic Council Film Prize	De unge år. Erik Nietzsche sagaen del 1	Nominated	
2009	Nordic Council's Film Prize	Antichrist	Won	
2012	Gaudí Award for Best European Film	Melancholia	Nominated	
2014	Nordic Council's Film Prize	Nymphomaniac	Nominated	
2015	Polish Film Award for Best European Film	Nymphomaniac	Nominated	
2015	Cinema Eye Honors	De fem benspænd	Won	

== Critics awards ==
Year	Nominated work	Association	Category	Result	Ref.
1996	Breaking the Waves	New York Film Critics Circle	Best Director	Won	
1996	Breaking the Waves	Boston Society of Film Critics	Best Director	2nd place	
1997	Breaking the Waves	National Society of Film Critics	Best Director	Won	
1997	Breaking the Waves	Chicago Film Critics Association	Best Director	Nominated	
1997	Breaking the Waves	Italian National Syndicate of Film Journalists	European Nastro d'Argento	Nominated	
2001	Dancer in the Dark	Chicago Film Critics Association	Best Original Score	Nominated	
2001	Dancer in the Dark	Online Film Critics Society	Best Director	Nominated	
2004	Dogville	Italian National Syndicate of Film Journalists	Best Foreign Director	Nominated	
2011	Melancholia	New York Film Critics Circle	Best Director	3rd place	
2011	Melancholia	Village Voice Film Poll	Best Director	2nd place	
2012	Melancholia	French Syndicate of Cinema Critics	Best Foreign Film	Won	
2012	Melancholia	Italian National Syndicate of Film Journalists	Best European Director	Nominated	
2012	Melancholia	National Society of Film Critics	Best Director	3rd place	
2012	Melancholia	Online Film Critics Society	Best Director	Nominated	
2012	Melancholia	Russian Guild of Film Critics	Best Foreign Film	Nominated	

== Film Festivals ==
=== Cannes Film Festival ===
Year	Nominated work	Category	Result	Ref.
1984	Forbrydelsens element	Palme d'Or	Nominated	
1984	Forbrydelsens element	Technical Grand Prize	Won	
1991	Europa	Palme d'Or	Nominated	
1991	Europa	Best Artistic Contribution	Won	
1991	Europa	Jury Prize	Won	
1991	Europa	Technical Grand Prize	Won	
1996	Breaking the Waves	Palme d'Or	Nominated	
1996	Breaking the Waves	Grand Prize of the Jury	Won	
1998	Idioterne	Palme d'Or	Nominated	
2000	Dancer in the Dark	Palme d'Or	Won	
2003	Dogville	Palme d'Or	Nominated	
2005	Manderlay	Palme d'Or	Nominated	
2009	Antichrist	Palme d'Or	Nominated	
2011	Melancholia	Palme d'Or	Nominated	

=== Other festivals ===
Year	Nominated work	Festival	Category	Result	Ref.
1984	Forbrydelsens element	Chicago International Film Festival	Best Feature Film	Won	
1984	Forbrydelsens element	International Filmfestival Mannheim-Heidelberg	Josef von Sternberg Award	Won	
1985	Forbrydelsens element	Avoriaz Fantastic Film Festival	Grand Prize	Nominated	
1986	Forbrydelsens element	Fantasporto	Best Director	Won	
1986	Forbrydelsens element	Fantasporto	Best Film	Nominated	
1988	Epidemic	Fantasporto	Best Film	Nominated	
1990	—N/a	NatFilm Festival	Night Dreamer Award	Won	
1991	Europa	Flanders International Film Festival Ghent	Grand Prix	Won	
1991	Europa	Sitges Film Festival	Best Film	Won	
1991	Europa	Stockholm International Film Festival	Best Film	Won	
1992	Europa	Fantasport	Best Director	Won	
1992	Europa	Fantasport	Best Film	Nominated	
1995	Riget	Karlovy Vary International Film Festival	Best Director	Won	
1995	Riget	Karlovy Vary International Film Festival	Grand Prix	Nominated	
1995	Riget	Seattle International Film Festival	Best Film	Won	
1996	Breaking the Waves	Ft. Lauderdale International Film Festival	Best Director	Won	
1996	Breaking the Waves	Lübeck Nordic Film Days	Baltic Film Prize for a Nordic Feature Film	Won	
1996	Breaking the Waves	Lübeck Nordic Film Days	Prize of the Ecumenical Jury	Won	
1996	Breaking the Waves	Stockholm International Film Festival	FIPRESCI Prize	Won	
1996	Breaking the Waves	Vancouver International Film Festival	Most Popular International Film	Won	
1997	Breaking the Waves	Uruguay International Film Festival	Best Film	Won	
1998	Breaking the Waves	SESC Film Festival	Best Foreign Film (Critics Award)	Won	
1998	Idioterne	London Film Festival	FIPRESCI Prize	Won	
1998	Idioterne	Valladolid International Film Festival	Golden Spike	Nominated	
1999	Riget	Fantasporto	Best Director	Won	
1999	Riget	Fantasporto	Best Screenplay	Won	
1999	Riget	Fantasporto	Best Film	Nominated	
2000	Dancer in the Dark	Tallinn Black Nights Film Festival	Audience Award	Won	
2001	Dancer in the Dark	SESC Film Festival	Best Foreign Film (Critics Award)	Won	
2001	Dancer in the Dark	SESC Film Festival	Best Foreign Director (Critics Award)	Won	
2001	Dancer in the Dark	SESC Film Festival	Best Foreign Film (Audience Award)	Won	
2001	Dancer in the Dark	SESC Film Festival	Best Foreign Director (Audience Award)	Won	
2003	Dogville	Copenhagen International Film Festival	Honorary Award	Won	
2003	De fem benspænd	Copenhagen International Documentary Festival	CPH:DOX Award	Nominated	
2004	De fem benspænd	Motovun Film Festival	FIPRESCI Prize	Won	
2004	Dogville	Sofia International Film Festival	Best Film (Audience Award)	Won	
2005	Dogville	SESC Film Festival	Best Foreign Film (Critics Award)	Won	
2005	Dogville	SESC Film Festival	Best Foreign Film (Audience Award)	Won	
2005	Dogville	SESC Film Festival	Best Foreign Director (Audience Award)	Won	
2005	Manderlay	Valladolid International Film Festival	50th Anniversary Prize	Won	
2005	Manderlay	Valladolid International Film Festival	Golden Spike	Nominated	
2006	Direktøren for det hele	San Sebastián International Film Festival	Golden Shell	Nominated	
2009	Antichrist	Neuchâtel International Fantastic Film Festival	Titra Film Award	Won	
2009	Antichrist	Neuchâtel International Fantastic Film Festival	Best Feature Film	Nominated	
2012	Melancholia	SESC Film Festival	Best Foreign Film (Critics Award)	Won	
2018	The House That Jack Built	Monster Fest	Best Director	Won	
