= Europa trilogy =

Danish experimental film trilogy

Europa
- Directed by: Lars von Trier
- Written by: Lars von Trier and Niels Vørsel
- Release dates: 14 May 1984 (The Element of Crime); 11 September 1987 (Epidemic); 12 May 1991 (Europa)
- Country: Denmark
- Language: English

The Europa trilogy is an experimental film trilogy created by Danish writers Lars von Trier and Niels Vørsel, comprising his three feature films The Element of Crime (1984), Epidemic (1987) and Europa (1991).

The films are set in different locations of Europe, and are not a narrative trilogy but rather are linked by common themes and stylistic explorations. The overarching subject of the trilogy may be taken to be the social crises and traumas of Europe in the future. Each of the three films follows a character whose idealistic actions ultimately perpetuate the very problem he seeks to solve. Trier's later USA: Land of Opportunities series also deals with both apparent social collapse, and the ill-effects of the interventions of idealistic individuals. Themes and creative aspects that the films share include hypnosis, a dystopian version of Europe, and experimental uses of colour. The trilogy also experiments with film noir conventions, and explores the relationship between reality and unreality.

The first and third films received largely positive reviews and garnered numerous awards including the Vulcan Award twice, while the second received mixed reviews.

== Films ==
=== The Element of Crime ===
Trier's first film is The Element of Crime, a 1984 crime drama film with elements of dystopian and neo-noir genres set in a decaying future Europe. Michael Elphick portrays Fisher, a detective who has become an expatriate living in Cairo, undergoes hypnosis in order to recall his last case.

=== Epidemic ===
Trier's second film is Epidemic, a 1987 horror film with elements of black comedy, medical thriller, and metafiction set in Copenhagen, Denmark. Trier and Niels Vørsel portray themselves as two of the three protagonists who write a new script about an epidemic: the outbreak of a plague-like disease. Last of the three protagonist is a doctor, Mesmer, who portrays Trier himself, goes to the countryside to find a cure.

=== Europa ===
Trier's third film is Europa (known as Zentropa to North American release due to similarities to the title of 1990 film Europa Europa), a 1991 anti-war film with elements of psychological drama and romance set in US-occupied Germany after the end of World War II. Jean-Marc Barr portrays Leopold Kessler, an idealistic German-American who takes on work as a sleeping-car conductor for the Zentropa railway network, falls in love with a femme fatale (Barbara Sukowa portrays Katharina Hartmann), and becomes embroiled in a pro-Nazi terrorist conspiracy.

== Production and release ==
Due to lack of collaborations in his first film, Trier himself and Leif Magnusson are the only two actors who appeared in all films. Among others, Trier's ex-wife Cecilia Holbek and frequent collaborator Udo Kier also appeared in the latter two films.

English title	Danish title	Release date	Director	Writer	Producer	Cast
The Element of Crime	Forbrydelsens element	May 14, 1984	Lars von Trier	Lars von Trier and Niels Vørsel	Per Holst	Michael Elphick as Fisher; Esmond Knight as Osborne; Meme Lai as Kim; Jerold Wells as Kramer
Epidemic	Epidemic	September 11, 1987	Lars von Trier	Lars von Trier and Niels Vørsel	Jacob Eriksen	Lars von Trier as himself; Niels Vørsel as himself; Udo Kier as himself; Cecilia Holbek Trier (nee Holbek) as herself
Zentropa	Europa	May 12, 1991	Lars von Trier	Lars von Trier and Niels Vørsel	Peter Aalbæk Jensen and Bo Christensen	Jean-Marc Barr as Leopold Kessler; Barbara Sukowa as Katharina Hartmann; Udo Kier as Lawrence Hartmann; Ernst-Hugo Järegård as Uncle Kessler

== Reception ==
=== Critical response ===
English title	Danish title	Rotten Tomatoes	Metacritic
The Element of Crime	Forbrydelsens element	77% (13 reviews)	66% (6 reviews)
Epidemic	Epidemic	25% (8 reviews)	66% (4 reviews)
Zentropa	Europa	80% (15 reviews)	69% (15 reviews)

=== Awards ===
English title	Danish title	Accolades
The Element of Crime	Forbrydelsens element	Bodil Award for Best Danish Film; Robert Award for Best Danish Film; Vulcan Award – Technical Grand Prize; Avoriaz Fantastic Film Festival – Grand Prix; Fantasporto Award for Best Director; Mannheim-Heidelberg International Filmfestival – Main Award
Epidemic	Epidemic	
Zentropa	Europa	Bodil Award for Best Danish Film; Robert Award for Best Danish Film; Vulcan Award – Technical Grand Prize; Cannes Film Festival – Prix du Jury; Cannes Film Festival Award for Best Artistic Contribution; Fantasporto Award for Best Director; Ghent International Film Festival – Grand Prix; Sitges Film Festival Award for Best Film; Stockholm Film Festival – Bronze Horse

== Legacy ==
Europa trilogy was officially collected as a part of The Criterion Collection on January 17, 2023.
