= Harry (British TV series) =

- Genre: Drama
- Starring: Michael Elphick; Tom Hollander; Julie Graham; Ian Bartholomew
- Composer: Tony McAnany
- Country of origin: United Kingdom
- Original language: English
- No. of series: 2
- No. of episodes: 20

Production
- Executive producers: Bradley Adams; Franc Roddam
- Producers: Joy Spink; Martin McKeand
- Running time: 50 minutes
- Production company: Union Pictures

Original release
- Network: BBC1
- Release: 18 September 1993 – 12 April 1995

Harry is a television drama series produced by Union Pictures for the BBC, and shown on BBC1 between 18 September 1993 and 12 April 1995. The programme follows a journalist called Harry Salter (played by Michael Elphick) who ran a news agency in the English town of Darlington.

== Cast ==
- Harry Salter – Michael Elphick
- Snappy – Ian Bartholomew
- Alice – Julie Graham
- Jonathan – Tom Hollander

== Episodes ==
=== Series 1 (1993) ===
No. overall	No. in series	Title	Directed by	Written by	Original release date
1	1	"First Strike"	Mary McMurray	Mick Ford	18 September 1993
Harry Salter was once a Fleet Street high-flier: he got the stories, he got the expense account and he got drunk. But now he is living on his wits running a news agency in Darlington. His first task is to investigate a death that looks like suicide and track down a rogue tattooist.
2	2	"Time Like This"	Mary McMurray	Mick Ford	25 September 1993
Earlier in his career he'd reached features editor status on Fleet Street, before the drink took hold. Now he's sniffing out the stories for the news agency in Darlington that he runs. In this time, a routine patrol with the motorway police uncovers a dramatic incident. Filmed in Three Squares cafe a local institution which is still open in 2025.
3	3	"Thought Invigoration"	Mary McMurray	Mick Ford	2 October 1993
Three grave-robbers think they've struck lucky until an antiques expert enlightens them. Meanwhile, Harry is anxiously awaiting the arrival of an old friend.
4	4	"Tooth to Claw"	Rob Walker	Mick Ford	9 October 1993
Harry's fictional Fleet Street colleagues feature in this week's episode when an ex-army officer is murdered on his patch. Harry goes off in hot pursuit of the IRA suspects, intent on selling the story to the national papers, but finds that the real villain is somewhat nearer home.
5	5	"Seeing Birthdays"	Rob Walker	Mick Ford	16 October 1993
Jonathan takes his video camera to cover a sick child's birthday party which turns into a major news story. Harry is contacted by the sinister owner of a champion fighting dog.
6	6	"Waiting for The Day"	Rob Walker	Mick Ford	23 October 1993
Harry could go to jail for what he did at the scene of a siege, but he insists on dealing with the problem in his own way.
7	7	"Clamouring"	Martin Stellman	Chris Ould	30 October 1993
Darlington's fearless newshounds stumble across the perfect tabloid shocker this week when Harry, just out of prison, sees a man breaking down a door with an axe. But this turns out to be even more juicy than the average Mad Axeman story, for the door in question belongs to a "glamour" photographer who has been producing pornographic pictures of local girls. Further investigations reveal a thriving business in pornography and prostitution being plied by local students desperate to supplement their grants. And one of them is the daughter of a town councillor who is a highly vocal campaigner against pornography.
8	8	"Outshined"	Martin Stellman	Chris Ould	6 November 1993
With an important Italian client to impress, Harry turns to invention. At the same time, he has an exclusive interview with a local football hero, but how can he make him sound interesting?
9	9	"Dealing with The Devil"	Martin Stellman	Jim Hill	20 November 1993
Nothing more than a conventional Sunday-paper tribute would seem to be called for, as far as Harry's news agency is concerned. But a visit to ex-reporter Dan Finch raises the ghost of a 15-year-old murder trial with Masonic entanglements. Also involved is Harry's friend, Nick then a young detective constable.
10	10	"Pointless Situations"	Mary McMurray	Chris Ould	27 November 1993
During a surprise party to celebrate the broadcast of Jonathan's "Video Diary", he gives Harry some bad news which causes bad feeling all round. But Harry is soon on the trail of a financial scandal involving a local employer.
11	11	"Out of the Black – Part 1"	Mary McMurray	Mick Ford	4 December 1993
A surgeon appeals for help, but Harry's on the trail of a much bigger story – so big that he's prepared to ditch Rita, Snappy and Alice and follow his lead to London and abroad.
12	12	"Out of the Black – Part 2"	Mary McMurray	Mick Ford	11 December 1993
He goes out with a real scoop, which causes a disgraced MP to resign, earns plaudits and more work from his Fleet Street masters and manages to upset his wife and staff back at the news agency in Darlington.

=== Series 2 (1995) ===
No. overall	No. in series	Title	Directed by	Written by	Original release date
13	1	"Over the Hills"	Lawrence Moody	Andrew Holden	22 February 1995
Harry has left everyone behind to chase the big story in Spain and the big money in Fleet Street. But he comes down to earth with a bump and returns to pick up the pieces of his north east agency.
14	2	"Cloak and Dagger"	Lawrence Moody	Peter Bowker	1 March 1995
Jonathan investigates the intimidation of a teenage witness to a murder case. Harry offers to protect the witness, but then loses him.
15	3	"Swindled"	Lawrence Moody	Dave Sheasby	8 March 1995
Harry investigates blackmail as a clean-cut footballer's image is threatened by his wife's past.
16	4	"Rocks and Stone"	Sid Roberson	Robin Mukherjee	15 March 1995
A soldier with a secret can be a dangerous business, especially when the establishment conspires to cover it up. When Harry finally uncovers the shocking truth, will he be allowed to tell it? Meanwhile, Snappy and Jonathan stake out an ageing rock star who returnsfrom the dead.
17	5	"Hell's Ghost"	Lawrence Moody	Arthur McKenzie	22 March 1995
Harry suspects that a local bigtime criminal, known as the Phantom and now living on the Costa Del Sol, is back in town. Harry is keen to get the exclusive. Ex-detective Jack Crow is also keen to find the Phantom, but for a different reason. It's a race to see who can find him first. To throw news-hungry Cheryl off the scent of his scoop, Harry uses some underhand methods to encourage her to investigate a devil-worship story that unexpectedly turns out to be connected with the Phantom.
18	6	"The Tangled Fish"	Rob Walker	Andrew Holden	29 March 1995
Snappy and Jonathan are in line for a "Good News" award. But events take a turn for the worse when a young prostitute disappears and her friends think she has been murdered. Alice is a dead ringer for the missing girl and decides to act as bait for the killer. Harry suspects a local judge. If he's right it will be a front page story; if he's wrong Alice could be the next victim.
19	7	"A Question of Truth"	Rob Walker	Robin Mukherjee	5 April 1995
Dean Hawkins breaks out of prison to settle a score with the local police and politicians who destroyed his father, especially parliamentary candidate Frank Melhouse. Meanwhile, Harry is beingfed information on Melhouse by an anonymous source.
20	8	"One Last Call"	Lawrence Moody	Sam Snape	12 April 1995
A child is kidnapped and Alice doesn't want Harry involved as the parents are friends of hers. But Harry can't pass up the chance of an exclusive.
