= De Udstillede =

- Directed by: Jesper Jargil
- Produced by: Helle Ulsteen; Vinca Wiedemann
- Starring: Lars von Trier
- Release date: 13 March 2000
- Running time: 81 minutes
- Country: Denmark

De Udstillede (English: The Exhibited) is a 2000 Danish documentary film directed by Jesper Jargil. It documents a theatrical experiment devised by Lars von Trier.

== The mechanism ==
Lars von Trier's experiment, conducted in 1996, was called Psychomobile 1 – The World Clock. Von Trier set up a video camera in the desert near Los Alamos, New Mexico, pointed at a piece of ground. The images recorded by this camera were fed into a digital apparatus.

At the same time, the Art Society Building in Copenhagen had been converted into a theatrical space consisting of 19 rooms. These rooms formed the stage to be used for three hours per day for 50 days by a group of 53 actors. Each room had a viewing space for the audience, who could wander from room to room to see the interactions of the actors. The actors were not given a script, but rather an explanation of their characters, each of which had four different sets of traits. The actors were instructed to improvise based on these four character phases.

Each room was equipped with a siren and a set of four colored lights, with each phase of each character linked to one of the four lights. The illuminated light in a specific room indicated that actors in that room had to adhere to the character traits corresponding to that light. When the siren in a particular room sounded, it signaled a change in the illuminated light, prompting actors to adjust their performance accordingly.

The change of light was triggered by a certain number of ants crossing a certain part of the image being recorded in New Mexico. The frequency with which the changes occurred was thus determined by whether very few or a great many ants happened to be crossing the area of desert watched by the video camera.

== The result ==
Jargil's film largely follows the problems and emotions faced by the actors in this unusual situation.
