= Lars von Trier =

Danish filmmaker (born 1956)

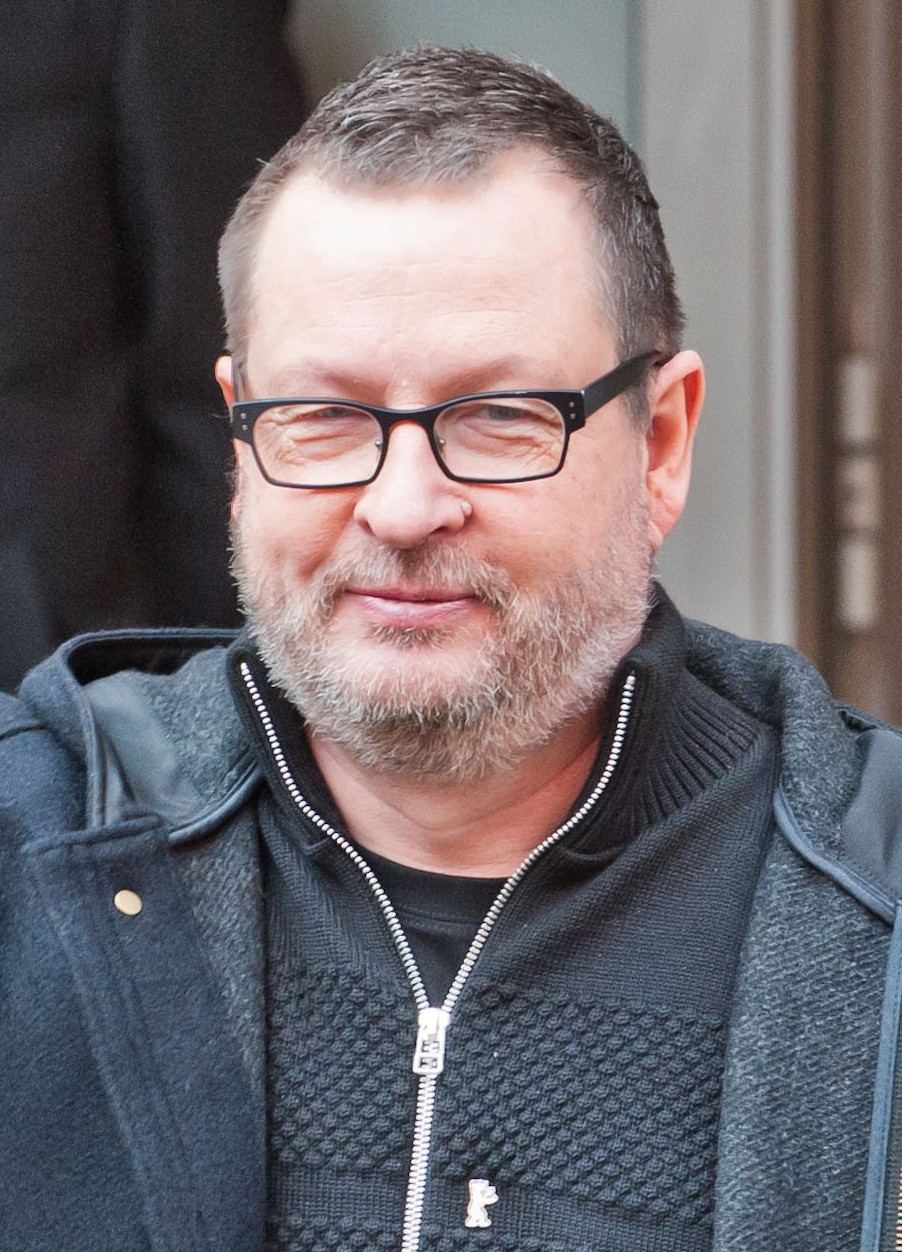
- Trier at the 64th Berlin International Film Festival, 2014
- Born: Lars Trier; 30 April 1956 (age 70); Kongens Lyngby, Denmark
- Education: National Film School of Denmark; University of Copenhagen
- Occupations: Film director; screenwriter
- Years active: 1967–present
- Works: Full list
- Movement: Hyperrealism; Dogme 95; German Expressionism
- Spouses: Cæcilia Holbek (m. 1987; div. 1995) Bente Frøge (m. 1997; div. 2015)
- Children: 4
- Awards: Full list

Lars von Trier (né Lars Trier; born 30 April 1956) is a Danish filmmaker. Widely known for his provocative and highly polarizing filmmaking style, his most notable works include Breaking the Waves (1996), The Idiots (1998), Dancer in the Dark (2000), Dogville (2003), Antichrist (2009), Melancholia (2011) and Nymphomaniac (2013), as well as The Kingdom miniseries trilogy (1994–2022).

Beginning in the late-1960s as a child actor working on Danish television series Secret Summer, Trier's career has spanned more than five decades. Considered a major figure of the European film industry, he and his works have been variously described as ambitious and provocative, as well as technically innovative. His films offer confrontational examinations of existential, social, psychosexual, and political issues, and deal in subjects including mercy, sacrifice, and mental health. He frequently collaborates with the actors Jens Albinus, Jean-Marc Barr, Udo Kier and Stellan Skarsgård.

Trier co-created the filmmaking movement Dogme 95 alongside fellow director Thomas Vinterberg and co-founded the Danish film production company Zentropa, the films from which have sold more than 350 million tickets and garnered eight Academy Award nominations.

Trier has been the subject of criticisms and controversies. Cannes Film Festival, in addition to awarding his films on numerous occasions, once listed him as persona non grata for making a Nazism joke during an interview. Animal harm on Manderlay's set, and graphic violence and unsimulated sex in some of his films have been criticized. He has also faced intense scrutiny for his alleged mistreatment and negligence towards actresses during the filming process, including Björk, who also accused him of sexual harassment.

== Early life and education ==
Born Lars Trier, he was born in Kongens Lyngby, Denmark, north of Copenhagen, his parents are Inger Høst and Ulf Trier. He later learned from Inger's deathbed that his biological father was Fritz Michael Hartmann, Inger's former boss at Denmark's Ministry of Social Affairs and a World War II resistance fighter.

He studied film theory at the University of Copenhagen and film direction at the National Film School of Denmark. At 25, he won two Best School Film awards at the Munich International Festival of Film Schools for Nocturne and Last Detail. The same year, he added the nobiliary particle "von" to his name, possibly as a satirical homage to the equally self-invented titles of directors Erich von Stroheim and Josef von Sternberg, and saw his graduation film Images of Liberation released as a theatrical feature.

== Career ==
=== 1984–1994: Career beginnings and Europa trilogy ===
In 1984, The Element of Crime, Trier's breakthrough film, received twelve awards at seven international festivals including the Technical Grand Prize at Cannes, and a nomination for the Palme d'Or. The film's slow, non-linear pace creates an allegory for traumatic European historical events. Trier's next film, Epidemic (1987), was also shown at Cannes in the Un Certain Regard section.

Trier has referred to his films as falling into thematic and stylistic trilogies. This pattern began with The Element of Crime (1984), the first of the Europa trilogy, which illuminated traumatic periods in Europe both in the past and the future. It also includes Epidemic. He completed the trilogy in 1991 with Europa (released as Zentropa in the US), which won the Prix du Jury at the 1991 Cannes Film Festival, and picked up awards at other major festivals. In 1990 he also directed the music video for the song "Bakerman" by Laid Back.

Seeking financial independence and creative control over their projects, in 1992 Trier and producer Peter Aalbæk Jensen founded the film production company Zentropa Entertainment, which has sold more than 350 million tickets and was nominated for multiple Academy Awards as of 2016. Named after a fictional railway company in Europa, their most recent film at the time, Zentropa has produced movies other than Trier's own. It has also produced hardcore sex films: Constance (1998), Pink Prison (1999), HotMen CoolBoyz (2000), and All About Anna (2005). Trier made The Kingdom (Danish title Riget, 1994) and The Kingdom II (Riget II, 1997), a pair of miniseries.

=== 1995–2000: Dogme 95 manifesto, and Golden Heart trilogy ===
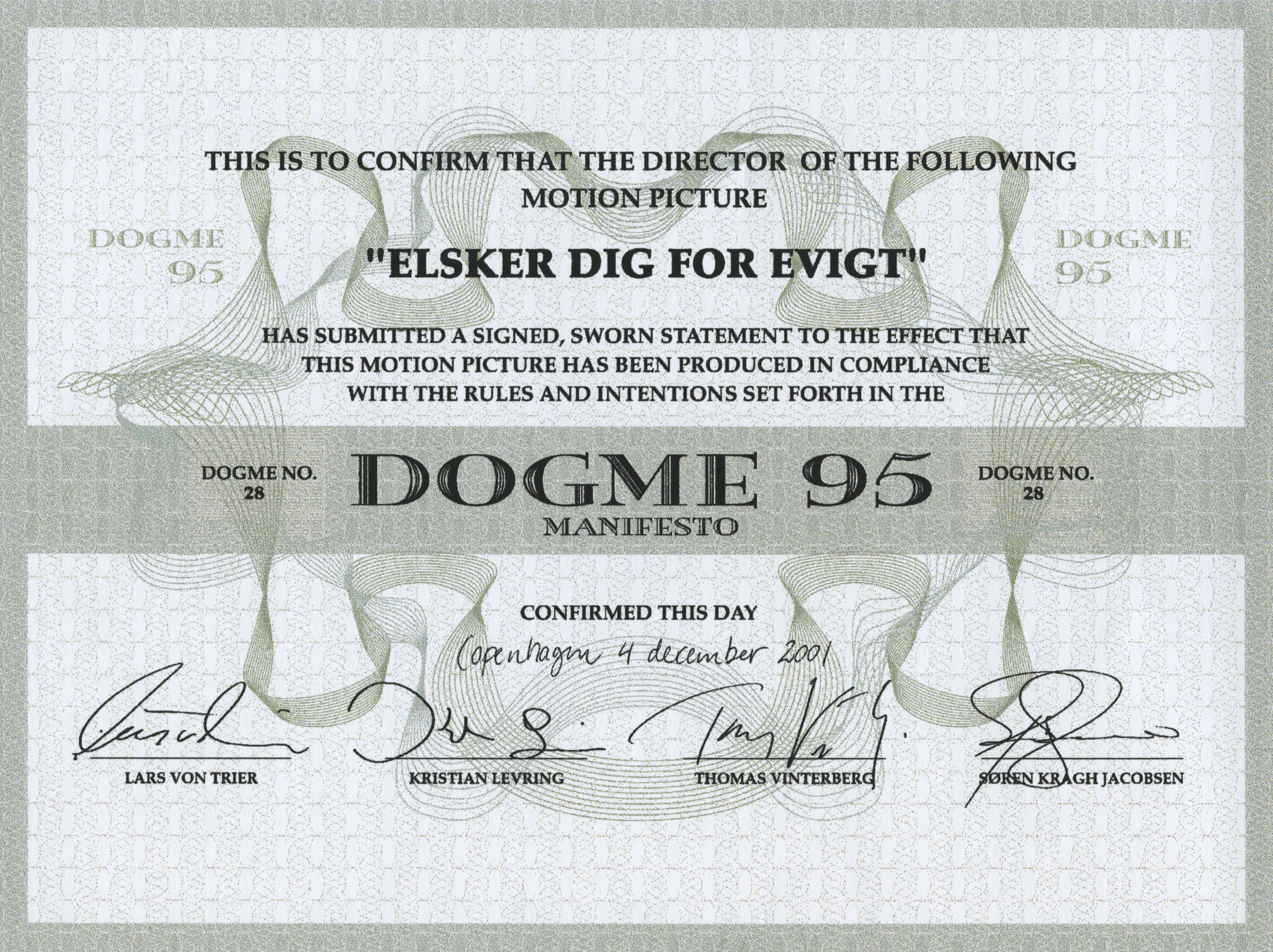
Dogme 95 Certificate for Susanne Bier's film Open Hearts

In 1995, Trier and Thomas Vinterberg presented their manifesto for a new cinematic movement, which they called Dogme 95. The Dogme 95 concept, which led to international interest in Danish film, inspired filmmakers all over the world. It required filmmakers to shirk several common techniques in modern filmmaking, such as studio lighting, sets, costumes, and non-diegetic music. In 2008, together with their fellow Dogme directors Kristian Levring and Søren Kragh-Jacobsen, Trier and Thomas Vinterberg received the European film award for European Achievement in World Cinema.

In 1996 Trier conducted an unusual theatrical experiment in Copenhagen involving 53 actors, which he titled Psychomobile 1: The World Clock. A documentary chronicling the project was directed by Jesper Jargil, and was released in 2000 with the title De Udstillede (The Exhibited).

Trier achieved international success with his Golden Heart trilogy. Each film in the trilogy is about naive heroines who maintain their "golden hearts" despite the tragedies they experience. This trilogy consists of Breaking the Waves (1996), The Idiots (1998), and Dancer in the Dark (2000).

Breaking the Waves won the Grand Prix at the Cannes Film Festival and featured Emily Watson, who was nominated for the Academy Award for Best Actress. The second film in the trilogy, The Idiots, was nominated for a Palme d'Or at the 1998 Cannes Film Festival. In 2000, Trier premiered Dancer in the Dark, a musical featuring Icelandic musician Björk, which won the Palme d'Or at Cannes. The song "I've Seen It All" (co-written by Trier) received an Academy Award nomination for Best Original Song.

=== 2003–2008: USA: Land of Opportunities trilogy and other works ===
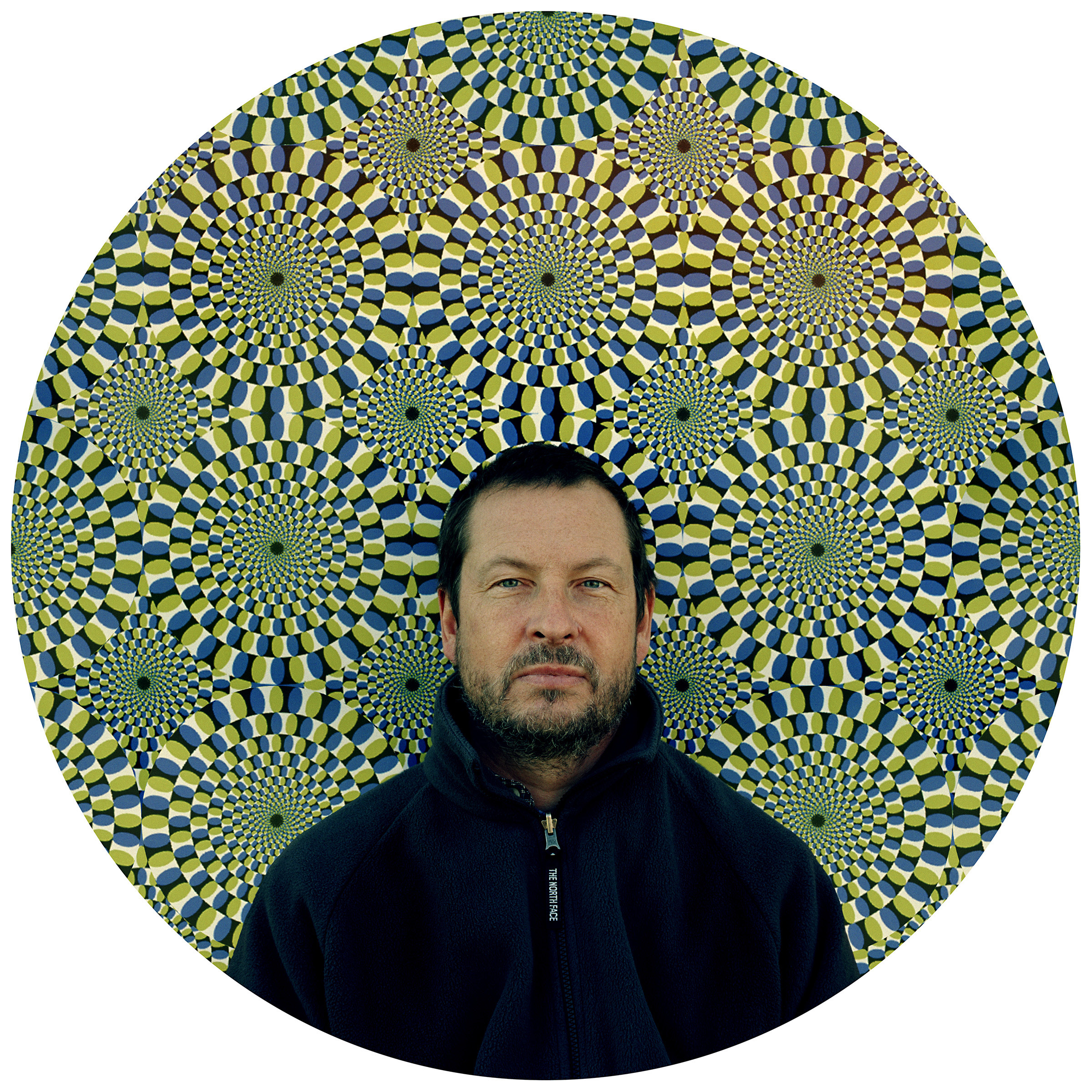
Lars von Trier photographed by Oliver Mark, Copenhagen 2003

The Five Obstructions (2003), made by Trier and Jørgen Leth, is a documentary that incorporates lengthy sections of experimental films. The premise is that Trier challenges Leth, his friend and mentor, to remake his 1967 experimental short The Perfect Human five times, each time with a different obstacle.

His next proposed trilogy, USA: Land of Opportunities, consists of Dogville (2003), Manderlay (2005), and the unmade Washington. The first two installments were shot with the same distinctive, extremely stylized approach, with the actors performing on a bare sound stage with no decoration, buildings' walls marked by chalk lines on the floor, a style inspired by 1970s televised theatre. Dogville starred Nicole Kidman as Grace Margaret Mulligan, a role taken by Bryce Dallas Howard for Manderlay. Both films feature an ensemble cast including Harriet Andersson, Lauren Bacall, James Caan, Danny Glover, and Willem Dafoe. The films question various issues relating to American society, such as intolerance and slavery.

A donkey was slaughtered for dramatic purposes during production of Manderlay, an act that caused actors including John C. Reilly to quit the film in protest at its cruelty to animals. The scene was cut from the film before it was released.

In 2006, Trier released the Danish-language comedy film, The Boss of It All. He followed this with a semi-autobiographical film, The Early Years: Erik Nietzsche Part 1 in 2007.

=== 2009–2014: Depression trilogy ===
The Depression trilogy consists of Antichrist, Melancholia, and Nymphomaniac. The three films star Charlotte Gainsbourg, and deal with characters who suffer depression or grief in different ways. This trilogy is said to represent the depression that Trier himself experiences.

Antichrist follows "a grieving couple who retreat to their cabin in the woods, hoping a return to Eden will repair their broken hearts and troubled marriage; but nature takes its course and things go from bad to worse". The film stars Willem Dafoe and Gainsbourg. It premiered in competition at the 2009 Cannes Film Festival, where the festival's jury honoured the movie by giving the Best Actress award to Gainsbourg.

Melancholia, released in 2011, is an apocalyptic drama about two depressive sisters played by Kirsten Dunst and Gainsbourg, the former of whom marries just before a rogue planet is about to collide with Earth. The film was in competition at the 2011 Cannes Film Festival, where it won the Best Actress award for Dunst.

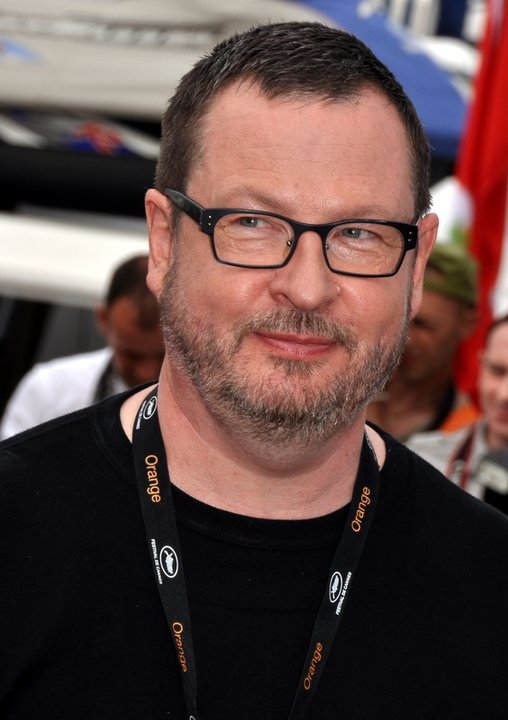
Trier at the 2011 Cannes Film Festival

In May 2011, known to be provocative in interviews, Trier's remarks during the press conference before the premiere of Melancholia in Cannes caused significant controversy in the media, leading the festival to declare him persona non grata. He was therefore banned from Cannes for one year, although Melancholia still competed in that year's competition.

Minutes before the end of the press conference, Trier was asked about his German roots and the Nazi aesthetic, in response to his description of the film's genre as "German romance". He joked that since he was "no longer Jewish," having been told the truth about his biological father, he now "understands" and "sympathizes" with Hitler, that he is not against the Jews except for Israel which is "a pain in the ass" and that he is a Nazi. Trier was branded an antisemite for his remarks. He released a formal apology immediately after the press conference and kept apologizing for his joke during all of the interviews he gave in the weeks following the incident, admitting that he was not sober, and saying that he did not need to explain that he is not a Nazi. However, in 2019, Trier stated that he made this remark at the "only press conference I ever had when I was sober."

The actors of Melancholia who were present during the incident – Dunst, Gainsbourg, Skarsgård – defended the director, pointing to his provocative sense of humor and his depression. He refused to attend a private press screening of his subsequent feature Nymphomaniac. In the director's defense, Skarsgård stated at the screening, "Everyone knows he's not a Nazi, and it was disgraceful the way the press had these headlines saying he was." The director of the Cannes festival later called the controversy "unfair" and as "stupid" as Trier's joke, concluding that his films are welcome at the festival and that Trier is considered a "friend".

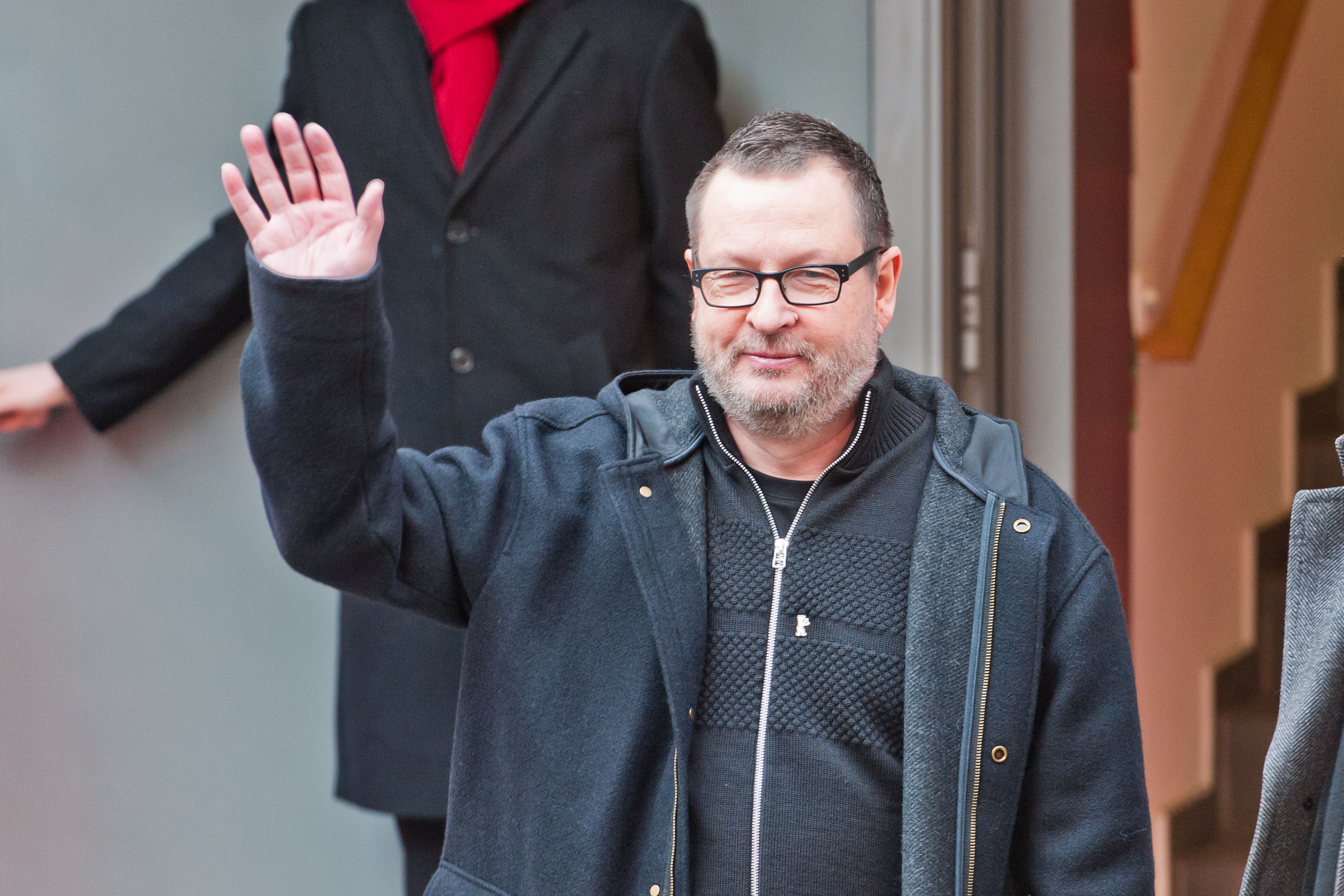
Trier in 2014

Following Melancholia, Trier began the production of Nymphomaniac, a film about the sexual awakening of a woman played by Gainsbourg. In early December 2013, a four-hour version was shown to the press in a private preview session. The cast also included Skarsgård (in his sixth film for Trier), Shia LaBeouf, Willem Dafoe, Jamie Bell, Christian Slater, and Uma Thurman. In response to claims that he had merely created a "porn film", Skarsgård stated "if you look at this film, it's actually a really bad porn movie, even if you fast forward. And after a while you find you don't even react to the explicit scenes. They become as natural as seeing someone eating a bowl of cereal." The film premiered in the UK in 2014.

In interviews prior to the film's release, Gainsbourg and co-star Stacy Martin revealed that prosthetic vaginas, body doubles, and special effects were used for the production of the film. Martin also stated that the film's characters were a reflection of the director himself, and referred to the experience as an "honour" that she enjoyed. The film was also released in two "volumes" for the Australian release on 20 March 2014, with an interval separating the back-to-back sections. In February 2014, an uncensored version of Volume I was shown at the Berlin Film Festival, with no announcement of when or if the complete five-and-a-half-hour Nymphomaniac would be made available to the public. The complete version premiered at the 2014 Venice Film Festival and was shortly afterward released in a limited theatrical run worldwide.

=== 2015–2018: The House That Jack Built and return to Cannes ===
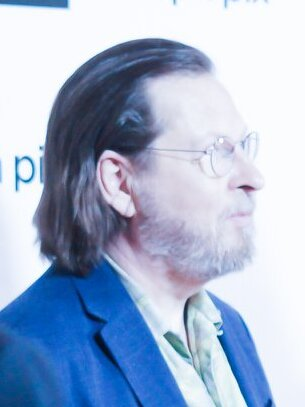
Trier in 2018

In 2015, Trier began work on a new feature film, The House That Jack Built, which was originally planned as an eight-part television series. The story is about a serial killer, seen from the murderer's point of view. It starred Matt Dillon in the title role, alongside Bruno Ganz, Riley Keough and Sofie Gråbøl. Shooting started in March 2017 in Sweden, before moving to Copenhagen in May.

In February 2017, Trier explained that the film "celebrates the idea that life is evil and soulless, which is sadly proven by the recent rise of the Homo trumpus – the rat king". The film premiered at the Cannes Film Festival in May 2018. Despite more than a hundred walkouts by audience members, the film still received a 10-minute standing ovation. Although The House that Jack Built was praised by animal rights organization PETA for its use of realistic effects, a scene involving the main character mutilating a duckling was the subject of criticism from some audiences.

=== 2019–present: The Kingdom trilogy ===
After the release of The House That Jack Built, Trier planned to produce Études, an anthology film consisting of ten black and white segments, each ten minutes long, inspired by the musical form, though it never came to fruition. In December 2020, it was announced he would produce a belated third and final season of The Kingdom, titled The Kingdom Exodus, with Søren Pilmark returning as Jørgen 'Hook' Krogshøj, Ghita Nørby as Rigmor Mortensen, alongside a new cast including Mikael Persbrandt as Dr. Helmer, Jr. It was shot in 2021, consisting of five episodes released in November 2022. The miniseries premiered out of competition at the Venice Film Festival as a five-hour feature-length film. It received mixed reviews from critics.

In 2024, Trier announced he was working on a new film titled After which will benefit from funding from the Danish Film Institute. Stellan Skarsgård was cast as the film's lead. Filming was expected to begin in summer 2025, with von Trier's health conditions reflected in the plot of the film.

== Aesthetics, themes, and style of working ==
=== Themes ===
Trier's films deal with themes of religious imagery and his treatment of subjects such as mercy, sacrifice, and mental health, confrontational examination of existential, social, and political issues. Most of the films depicted in various forms of politics and religions, such as Nazism in Europa, Christianity in Breaking the Waves and The House that Jack Built, atheism in Dogville, and anti-bourgeois in The Idiots.

=== Influences ===
Trier is heavily influenced by the work of Carl Theodor Dreyer and the film The Night Porter. He was so inspired by the short film The Perfect Human, directed by Jørgen Leth, that he challenged Leth to redo the short five times in the feature film The Five Obstructions.

=== Writing ===
Trier's writing style has been heavily influenced by his work with actors on set, as well as the Dogme 95 manifesto that he co-authored. In an interview with Creative Screenwriting, he described his process as "writing a sketch and keep[ing] the story simple...then part of the script work is with the actors." He again cites Dreyer as an influence, pointing to his method of overwriting his scripts, then significantly cutting the length down. Reflecting on the storytelling across his body of work, Trier said, "all the stories are about a realist who comes into conflict with life. I'm not crazy about real life, and real life is not crazy about me."

=== Filming techniques ===
Trier has said that "a film should be like a stone in your shoe". To create original art he feels that filmmakers must distinguish themselves stylistically from other films, often by placing restrictions on the film making process. The most famous such restriction is the cinematic "vow of chastity" of theDogme 95 movement. In Dancer in the Dark, he used jump shots and dramatically different color palettes and camera techniques for the "real world" and musical portions of the film.

Trier often shoots digitally and operates the camera himself, preferring to continuously shoot the actors in-character without stopping between takes. In Dogville, because there were no walls between the "buildings" on the set, actors needed to stay in character for hours, even when not part of the scene being filmed. These techniques often put great strain on the actors, most famously with Björk during the filming of Dancer in the Dark.

Trier would later return to explicit images in Antichrist (2009), exploring darker themes, but he ran into problems when he tried once more with Nymphomaniac, which had 90 minutes cut out (reducing it from five-and-one-half to four hours) for its international release in 2013 in order to be commercially viable, taking nearly a year to be shown complete anywhere in an uncensored director's cut.

While Trier commissioned new musical compositions for his early films, his more recent work has made use of existing music. With Nymphomaniac, the principle of musical eclecticism is also applied within the film. He often heavily edits compositions to manipulate and provoke the audience.

=== Approach to actors ===
In an interview for IndieWire, Trier compared his approach to actors with "how a chef would work with a potato or a piece of meat", clarifying that working with actors has differed on each film based on the production conditions. He has occasionally courted controversy by his treatment of his lead actresses. He and Björk famously fell out during the shooting of Dancer in the Dark, to the point where she would abscond from filming for days at a time. She said of Trier, who shattered a monitor while it was next to her, that "you can take quite sexist film directors like Woody Allen or Stanley Kubrick and still they are the one that provide the soul to their movies. In Lars von Trier's case it is not so and he knows it. He needs a female to provide his work soul. And he envies them and hates them for it. So he has to destroy them during the filming. And hide the evidence."

Nicole Kidman, who starred in Trier's Dogville, said in an interview with ABC Radio National that she tried to quit the film several times in response to comments Trier made on set, often while inebriated, "but I say this laughing...I didn't do the sequel but I'm still very good friends with him, strangely enough, because I admire his honesty and I see him as an artist, and I say, my gosh, it's such a hard world now to have a unique voice, and he certainly has that."

However, other actresses he has worked with, such as Kirsten Dunst and Charlotte Gainsbourg have spoken out in defence of his approach. Nymphomaniac star Stacy Martin has stated that he never forced her to do anything that was outside her comfort zone. She said "I don't think he's a misogynist. The fact that he sometimes depicts women as troubled or dangerous or dark or even evil; that doesn't automatically make him anti-feminist. It's a very dated argument. I think that Lars loves women."

=== Sexual harassment allegations with Björk ===
In October 2017, in the wake of dozens of sexual abuse cases brought against film producer Harvey Weinstein, Björk posted on her Facebook page that she had been sexually harassed by a Danish film director. She commented:

It was extremely clear to me when I walked into the actresses profession that my humiliation and role as a lesser sexually harassed being was the norm and set in stone with the director and a staff of dozens who enabled it and encouraged it. I became aware of that it is a universal thing that a director can touch and harass his actresses at will and the institution of film allows it. When I turned the director down repeatedly he sulked and punished me and created for his team an impressive net of illusion where I was framed as the difficult one. ... and in my opinion he had a more fair and meaningful relationship with his actresses after my confrontation so there is hope. Let's hope this statement supports the actresses and actors all over. Let's stop this. There is a wave of change in the world.

The Los Angeles Times found evidence identifying him as Lars von Trier. Von Trier has rejected Björk's allegation that he sexually harassed her during the making of the film Dancer in the Dark, and said "That was not the case. But that we were definitely not friends, that's a fact", to Danish daily Jyllands-Posten in its online edition. Peter Aalbæk Jensen, the producer of Dancer in the Dark, told Jyllands-Posten that "as far as I remember we [Lars von Trier and I] were the victims. That woman was stronger than both Lars von Trier and me and our company put together. She dictated everything and was about to close a movie of 100m kroner [$16m]". After Trier's statement, Björk published further allegations against the director via her personal Facebook page.

The Guardian later alleged that Jensen's studio, Zentropa, with which Trier frequently collaborated, had had an endemic culture of sexual harassment. Jensen stepped down from CEO position of Zentropa as further harassment allegations were published in 2017.

=== Sex and violence in films ===
Several of his films – The Idiots (1998), Antichrist (2009), Nymphomaniac (2013) and The House That Jack Built (2018) – contain explicit content that has generated controversy; the first faced widespread backlash upon its release as one film critic, Mark Kermode, was ejected from The Idiots premiere screening at Cannes for heckling, and the film was heavily censored for subsequent releases. At the 2018 Cannes Film Festival, approximately 100 audience members walked out of the premiere of The House That Jack Built.

== Personal life ==
=== Family ===
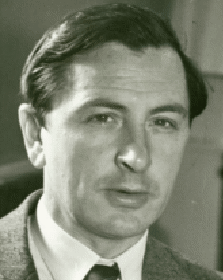
Fritz Michael Hartmann (c. 1950)

In 1989, Trier's mother confessed to him on her deathbed that his biological father was not the man who raised him, but her former employer, Fritz Michael Hartmann (1909–2000), who was descended from a long line of Danish classical musicians. Hartmann's grandfather was Emil Hartmann, and his great-grandfather J. P. E. Hartmann. His uncles included Niels Gade and Johan Ernst Hartmann, and Niels Viggo Bentzon was his cousin. She stated that she did this to give her son "artistic genes". Trier has jokingly said, by reference to the distant German origin of the Hartmann family, that while he believed he had a Jewish background, he is "really more of a Nazi."

During the German occupation of Denmark, Hartmann in fact joined a resistance group, actively counteracting any pro-German and pro-Nazi colleagues in his civil service department. Another member of this resistance group was Hartmann's colleague Viggo Kampmann, who would later become prime minister of Denmark. After Trier had four awkward meetings with his biological father, Hartmann refused further contact.

From 1987 to 1995, Trier was married to producer and actress Cæcilia Holbek, with whom he has two daughters, Agnes and Selma (both producers like their parents), and from 1997 to 2015 to Bente Frøge, with whom he has two sons.

=== Family background and political and religious views ===
Trier's mother considered herself a communist, while Ulf Trier was a social democrat. Both were committed nudists, and Trier went on several childhood holidays to nudist camps. They regarded the disciplining of children as reactionary. Trier has noted that he was brought up in an atheist family, and that although Ulf Trier was Jewish, he was not religious. His parents did not allow much room in their household for "feelings, religion, or enjoyment", and also refused to make any rules for their children.

In a 2005 interview with Die Zeit, Trier said, "I don't know if I'm all that Catholic really. I'm probably not. Denmark is a very Protestant country. Perhaps I only turned Catholic to piss off a few of my countrymen." In 2009, he said, "I'm a very bad Catholic. In fact I'm becoming more and more of an atheist."

In August 2023, Trier published on Instagram a critical entry against the delivery of F-16 fighters to Ukraine, ending his post by saying "Russian lives matter also!" The entry immediately became publicized in official Russian media and by the Russian media executive Margarita Simonyan. Oleksiy Danilov, head of Ukraine's National Security and Defense Council, responded on Twitter, criticising Trier's comments, saying, "The choice between the executioner and the victim becomes a tragedy when the artist chooses the side of the executioner." Two days later, Trier then made another post on Instagram, saying, "I support Ukraine with every beat of my heart! I was just stating the obvious: that all lives in this world matter!"

=== Health ===
==== Mental health ====
Trier suffers from various fears and phobias, including an intense fear of flying. This fear frequently places severe constraints on him and his crew, necessitating that virtually all of his films be shot in either Denmark or Sweden.

On numerous occasions, he has stated that he suffers from occasional depression which renders him incapable of doing his work and unable to fulfill social obligations.

==== Parkinson's disease ====
On 8 August 2022, it was announced that Trier had been diagnosed with Parkinson's disease. According to Variety, Trier plans to take a break from filmmaking to adjust to his new life with the disease, saying: "I will take a little break and find out what to do, but I certainly hope that my condition will be better. It's a disease you can't take away; you can work with the symptoms, though." On 12 February 2025, Zentropa producer Louise Vesth announced via Instagram that Trier had been admitted to a care facility for the condition.

== Filmography ==
=== Feature films ===
| Year | Title | Also known as | Trilogies | Release date | RT | MC |
|---|---|---|---|---|---|---|
| 1984 | The Element of Crime | (Forbrydelsens element) | Europa | 14 May | 83% (18 reviews) | 66% (6 reviews) |
| 1987 | Epidemic | | Europa | 11 September | 25% (8 reviews) | 66% (4 reviews) |
| 1991 | Europa | (Zentropa) | Europa | 12 May | 81% (16 reviews) | 69% (15 reviews) |
| 1996 | Breaking the Waves | | Golden Heart | 18 May | 85% (65 reviews) | 82% (29 reviews) |
| 1998 | The Idiots | (Idioterne) | Golden Heart | 20 May | 72% (31 reviews) | 48% (17 reviews) |
| 2000 | Dancer in the Dark | | Golden Heart | 17 May | 70% (122 reviews) | 63% (31 reviews) |
| 2003 | Dogville | | USA: Land of Opportunities | 19 May | 70% (168 reviews) | 61% (30 reviews) |
| 2003 | The Five Obstructions | (De fem benspænd) | | 11 September | 89% (62 reviews) | 79% (22 reviews) |
| 2005 | Manderlay | | USA: Land of Opportunities | 16 May | 50% (103 reviews) | 46% (29 reviews) |
| 2006 | The Boss of It All | (Direktøren for det hele) | | 21 September | 75% (67 reviews) | 71% (17 reviews) |
| 2009 | Antichrist | | Depression | 20 May | 54% (179 reviews) | 49% (34 reviews) |
| 2011 | Melancholia | | Depression | 18 May | 80% (207 reviews) | 81% (40 reviews) |
| 2013 | Nymphomaniac | | Depression | 25 December | 76% (I; 204 reviews) and 59% (II; 128 reviews) | 64% (I; 41 reviews) and 61% (II; 34 reviews) |
| 2018 | The House That Jack Built | | | 14 May | 59% (137 reviews) | 42% (29 reviews) |

=== Television ===
| Year | Title | Also known as | Trilogies | Release date | RT | MC |
|---|---|---|---|---|---|---|
| 1994 | The Kingdom I | (Riget) | The Kingdom | 24 November – 15 December | 84% (19 reviews) | 77% (9 reviews) |
| 1997 | The Kingdom II | (Riget II) | The Kingdom | 10 October – 31 October | 84% (19 reviews) | 77% (9 reviews) |
| 2022 | The Kingdom: Exodus | (Riget: Exodus) | The Kingdom | 9 October – 30 October | 84% (19 reviews) | 77% (9 reviews) |

=== Frequent collaborators ===
Trier often works more than once with actors and production members. Manon Rasmussen was the only crew member as a costume designer to collaborate with Trier in all of his works (except Medea and The Idiots) since The Element of Crime (1984). His first, but initial acting collaborator for The Element of Crime was Leif Magnusson, who appeared in his role as a hotel guest, yet continued to appear again in the last two films as different minor roles for his first trilogy until his acting retirement in the early 1990s. His main crew members and producer team has remained intact since Europa. Many of his recurring actors have expressed their devotion to Trier. European actors Jean-Marc Barr, Udo Kier, and Stellan Skarsgård have all appeared across several Trier films. With the exception of Medea, The Kingdom, his incompleted "USA Trilogy", and The House that Jack Built; British-French actress Charlotte Gainsbourg and Swedish actor Leif Magnusson are the only two acting collaborators (excluding himself) to have appeared in all installments of two of his trilogies, taking the lead roles in Depression for the former and minor roles in Europa for the latter.

Note: This list shows only the actors (in alphabetical order only) who have collaborated with Trier in three or more productions.

| Actor | The Element of Crime | Epidemic | Medea | Europa | The Kingdom | Breaking the Waves | The Idiots | Dancer in the Dark | Dogville | Manderlay | The Boss of It All | Antichrist | Dimension (unfinished)^{[1]} | Melancholia | Nymphomaniac | The House That Jack Built |
|---|---|---|---|---|---|---|---|---|---|---|---|---|---|---|---|---|
| Jens Albinus | | | | | Yes | | Yes | Yes | | | Yes | | | | Yes | |
| Jean-Marc Barr | | | | Yes | | Yes | | Yes | Yes | Yes | Yes | | Yes | | Yes | archive footage; uncredited |
| Willem Dafoe | | | | | Yes | | | | | Yes | | Yes | | | Yes | archive footage; uncredited |
| Jeremy Davies | | | | | | | | | Yes | Yes | | | | | | Yes |
| Charlotte Gainsbourg | | | | | | | | | | | | Yes | | Yes | Yes | archive footage; uncredited |
| Vera Gebuhr | | | Yes | Yes | Yes | | | | | | | | | | | |
| Siobhan Fallon Hogan | | | | | | | | Yes | Yes | | | | | | | Yes |
| Anders Hove | | | | | Yes | | Yes | | | | Yes | | | | Yes | |
| John Hurt | | | | | | | | | Yes | Yes | | | | Yes | | |
| Željko Ivanek | | | | | | | | Yes | Yes | Yes | | | | | | |
| Ernst-Hugo Järegård | | | | Yes | Yes | | | | | | | | Yes | | | |
| Henning Jensen | | | Yes | Yes | Yes | | | | | | | | | | | |
| Udo Kier | | Yes | Yes | Yes | Yes | Yes | | Yes | Yes | Yes | | | Yes | Yes | Yes | archive footage; uncredited |
| Leif Magnusson | Yes | Yes | | Yes | | | | | | | | | | | | |
| Baard Owe | | | Yes | Yes | Yes | | | | | | | | Yes | | | |
| Stellan Skarsgård | | | | | Yes | Yes | | Yes | Yes | | | | Yes | Yes | Yes | |

== Awards and honors ==
Among his more than 100 awards and 200 nominations at film festivals worldwide, Trier has received: the Palme d'Or (for Dancer in the Dark), the Grand Prix (for Breaking the Waves), the Prix du Jury (for Europa), and the Technical Grand Prize (for The Element of Crime and Europa) at the Cannes Film Festival. Trier has also received both Golden Globe Award and Academy Award nominations for the former.

| Year | Film | Cannes Film Festival | | Bodil Awards | | Robert Awards | | European Film Awards | |
| Year | Film | Nom. | Wins | Nom. | Wins | Nom. | Wins | Nom. | Wins |
|---|---|---|---|---|---|---|---|---|---|
| 1984 | The Element of Crime | 2 | 1 | 1 | 1 | 7 | 7 | | |
| 1991 | Europa | 4 | 3 | 1 | 1 | 7 | 7 | 2 | |
| 1994-2022 | Riget | | | 7 | 7 | 11 | 6 | 1 | |
| 1996 | Breaking the Waves | 2 | 1 | 3 | 3 | 9 | 9 | 3 | 3 |
| 1998 | The Idiots | 1 | | 4 | 3 | 1 | 1 | 1 | |
| 2000 | Dancer in the Dark | 2 | 2 | 2 | 1 | 11 | 5 | 4 | 4 |
| 2003 | Dogville | 1 | | 3 | 1 | 8 | 2 | 4 | 1 |
| 2003 | The Five Obstructions | | | | | | | 1 | |
| 2005 | Manderlay | 1 | | 1 | | 9 | | 3 | |
| 2009 | Antichrist | 2 | 1 | 5 | 5 | 12 | 7 | 3 | 1 |
| 2011 | Melancholia | 2 | 1 | 7 | 2 | 13 | 10 | 8 | 3 |
| 2013 | Nymphomaniac | | | 6 | 1 | 16 | 8 | 4 | |
| 2018 | The House that Jack Built | | | 2 | 1 | 11 | 2 | | |
| Total | | 17 | 9 | 42 | 26 | 110 | 64 | 34 | 12 |

- In Trier's second trilogy, Golden Heart, is the first franchise or trilogy to have won both Bodil and Robert for Best Actress in a Leading Role, respectively Emily Watson, Bodil Jorgensen, and Björk, while Watson and Björk also have won the European for Best Actress.
  - Also in Golden Heart, three of them have nominated the Palme d'Or, with the latter won.
- In Trier's fourth trilogy, Depression, is the first franchise or trilogy to have sweep the Robert for Best Danish Film, Best Director, Best Screenplay, Best Cinematography, Best Editing, Best Sound, and Best Visual Effects.

== Notes ==
- 1 Dimension was originally intended as a feature-length gangster film with each 33 years of development as for 2024 per theatrical release, but he lost interest in the project after the deaths of Cartlidge, Constantine, and Hugo Järegård, in which he completes one of the footages into a short film instead.
