= Jerold Wells =

English actor (1908–1999)

- Born: 8 August 1908; Wallington, Hampshire, England, UK
- Died: 19 July 1999 (aged 90); Bath, Somerset, England, UK
- Occupation: Actor

Jerold Wells (8 August 1908 – 19 July 1999) was an English actor. He was born in Wallington, Hampshire, and died in Bath, Somerset.

He appeared primarily in British comedies. Films included Adventures of a Plumber's Mate and the TV-made 'Carry On Kitchener'. Two of his best-known roles were in Time Bandits, where he played Benson, a mentally disturbed follower of Evil, and in Jabberwocky, in which he played a footless man known as "Wat Dabney". He also appeared on television, in The Two Ronnies, Coronation Street, The Old Curiosity Shop, Catweazle and The Benny Hill Show. He was also shortlisted to play Captain Birdseye, but lost out to John Hewer.

== Partial filmography ==
- Three in One (1957) - Wally (segment "Joe Wilson's Mates")
- The Naked Truth (1957) - 1st Irishman (uncredited)
- High Hell (1958) - Charlie Spence
- Law and Disorder (1958) - Cell Warder (uncredited)
- Passport to Shame (1958) - Taxi Driver in Office (uncredited)
- The Criminal (1960) - Warder Brown
- Dangerous Afternoon (1961) - George 'Butch' Birling
- Playback (1962) - Insp. Parkes
- Crooks Anonymous (1962) - Sydney - Large Nightwatchman
- Edgar Wallace Mysteries - 'Candidate for Murder', episode - (1962) - Police Inspector
- The Pirates of Blood River (1962) - Penal Colony Master
- Maniac (1963) - Giles
- The Cracksman (1963) - Chief Prison Officer
- Masquerade (1965) - Brindle (uncredited)
- Smashing Time (1967) - Man in Cafe No. 6
- The Ghost of Monk's Island (1967) - Convict
- A Ghost of a Chance (1968)
- Journey into Darkness (1968) - Mayhew (episode 'Paper Dolls')
- Anne of the Thousand Days (1969) - Boleyn Axeman (uncredited)
- Burke & Hare (1971) - Landlord
- Never Mind the Quality, Feel the Width (1973) - Tramp
- The Vault of Horror (1973) - Waiter (segment 1 "Midnight Mess")
- Gawain and the Green Knight (1973) - Sergeant
- Frankenstein and the Monster from Hell (1974) - Landlord
- Barry McKenzie Holds His Own (1974) - Quiz Panel Judge (uncredited)
- Jabberwocky (1977) - Wat Dabney
- Adventures of a Plumber's Mate (1978) - Stropper
- A Hitch in Time (1978) - The King (uncredited)
- Time Bandits (1981) - Benson
- The Element of Crime (1984) - Kramer
- Sword of the Valiant (1984) - 1st Torturer
