= Michael Elphick =

English actor (1946–2002)

- Elphick as Ken Boon in Boon
- Born: Michael John Elphick; 19 September 1946; Chichester, West Sussex, England
- Died: 7 September 2002 (aged 55); Willesden Green, London, England
- Education: Royal Central School of Speech and Drama
- Occupation: Actor
- Years active: 1969–2002
- Television: Three Up, Two Down; Boon; Harry; EastEnders
- Partner: Julia Alexander (1963–1996)

Michael John Elphick (19 September 1946 – 7 September 2002) was an English film and television actor. He played the eponymous private investigator in the ITV series Boon and Harry Slater in BBC's EastEnders. He was nominated for a BAFTA Award for Best Supporting Actor for his performance in the 1983 film Gorky Park. With his gruff Sussex accent and lip-curling sneer, he often played menacing hard men.

Elphick struggled with an addiction to alcohol; at the height of his problem, he admitted to consuming two litres of spirits a day, which contributed to his death from a heart attack in 2002.

== Early life ==
Michael John Elphick was born on 19 September 1946 and grew up in Chichester, Sussex, where his family had a butcher's shop. He was educated at Lancastrian Secondary Modern Boys School in Chichester, where he took part in several school productions including Noah and A Midsummer Night's Dream. He initially considered joining the Merchant Navy and helped out in his local boatyard during school holidays.

It has been reported that he stumbled upon acting by chance when, at the age of 15, he took a job as an apprentice electrician at the Chichester Festival Theatre while it was being built. He gained an interest in acting whilst watching stars such as Laurence Olivier, Michael Redgrave and Sybil Thorndike. Olivier advised Elphick to go to drama school and gave him two speeches to use at auditions. Elphick was offered a number of places but decided to train at the Central School of Speech and Drama, in Swiss Cottage (aged 18), because Olivier had attended there.

== Career ==
After graduating from drama school Elphick was offered roles primarily as menacing heavies. He made his debut in Fraulein Doktor (an Italian-made First World War film circa 1968). He went on to play the Captain in Tony Richardson's version of Hamlet (1969); landed parts in cult films such as The First Great Train Robbery and The Elephant Man and appeared in Lindsay Anderson's allegorical O Lucky Man! (1973). He was also seen as Phil Daniels' father in the cult film Quadrophenia (1979), as Pasha in Gorky Park (1983) and as the poacher, Jake, in Withnail & I (1987). In 1984 he played the lead, Fisher, a British detective recalling under hypnosis a dystopian, crumbling Europe and his hunt for a serial killer, in Lars von Trier's Palme D'Or nominated debut film, The Element of Crime.

On stage, Elphick played Marcellus and the Player King in Tony Richardson's stage version of Hamlet at the Roundhouse Theatre and on Broadway and he later played Claudius to Jonathan Pryce's Hamlet at the Royal Court Theatre, directed by Richard Eyre. In 1981 he appeared in the Ray Davies/Barrie Keeffe musical Chorus Girls at the Theatre Royal, Stratford East and he was also seen in The Changing Room, directed by Lindsay Anderson, at the Royal Court Theatre. His last West End stage appearance was in 1997 as Doolittle in Pygmalion directed by Ray Cooney at the Albery Theatre.

However, it was for his television roles that Elphick became best known. He briefly appeared in Coronation Street (1974) as Douglas Wormold, son of the landlord Edward, who for many years owned most of the properties in the road. Douglas unsuccessfully tried to buy the newsagent shop The Kabin from Len Fairclough. He played three characters in the popular Granada Television series Crown Court: in 1973 as a defendant; in 1975 as a witness (Frank Hollins, private secretary to a female soprano in the episode Songbirds out of Tune); and from 1975 to 1983 as the barrister Neville Griffiths Q.C.

He played one of the main roles in the film Black Island in 1978 for the Children's Film Foundation, played a villain in The Sweeney episode "One of Your Own" (1978) and played a policeman in The Professionals episode "Backtrack" (1979) and had a minor role in Hazell (1979), and appeared in the Dennis Potter play Blue Remembered Hills (1979). Elphick took the title role in Jack Pulman's six part comedy-drama Private Schulz (1981). Here he played alongside Ian Richardson the German forger Gerhard Schulz, who is conscripted into SS Counter Espionage during the Second World War to destroy the British economy by flooding it with forged money.

He appeared as the Irish labourer Magowan during the first series of Auf Wiedersehen, Pet (1983) and starred as Sidney Mundy in the ITV sitcom Pull the Other One (1984), before playing Sam Tyler in four series of Three Up, Two Down (1985–89). In 1986 Elphick landed his biggest television success, Boon (1986–92, 1995). He played Ken Boon, a retired fireman who opened a motorbike despatch business and later became a private investigator. Boon was very successful and ran for seven series, attracting audiences of 11 million at its peak. There was also a one-off episode screened in 1995, two years after it had been made. During breaks from Boon, Elphick continued to act in film with cameo roles in The Krays (1990) and Let Him Have It (1991), and in 1991 he played Des King in Buddy's Song, starring Chesney Hawkes and Roger Daltrey. For Independent Television company TSW, he took a rare TV presenting role, alongside Don Henderson from The XYY Man, in the food programme The Absolute Beginner's Guide to Cookery.

In 1993 Elphick took the role of a former Fleet Street journalist running a Darlington news agency in Harry (1993, 1995). He played the alcoholic and ruthless Harry Salter, who frequently used exploitation and underhand tactics to get a story. This series however was less successful and it was soon cancelled. Elphick went on to play Billy Bones in Ken Russell's televised version of Treasure Island (1995) and Barkis in David Copperfield (1999).

In 2001 he joined the cast of EastEnders, where he played Harry Slater, a romantic interest for Peggy Mitchell (Barbara Windsor). The plotline indicated that Slater had sexually abused his niece, Kat Slater (Jessie Wallace), at the age of 13 and her "sister" Zoe (Michelle Ryan) was the daughter born to her when she became pregnant by him. Elphick's heavy drinking began to affect his performances, so the character promptly left the series and was killed off off-screen.

== Personal life ==
Elphick met his long-term partner, schoolteacher Julia Alexander, in 1963 and remained with her until her death from cancer in 1996. The couple had a daughter.

For many years Elphick struggled with alcoholism. He made the first of many attempts to stop drinking in 1988. He sought help from Alcoholics Anonymous in the early 1990s, although he admitted he was still drinking in 1993. In 1996, he admitted that he had begun drinking heavily again and also contemplated suicide after the death of his partner of 33 years. However, he rallied and returned to the stage in Loot.

He also confessed to having taken cocaine and once, while high on drugs, grabbing a shotgun and chasing a gang of thugs after he had been carjacked near his villa in Portugal.

Elphick was admitted to the Priory Hospital in Roehampton, in an attempt to beat his addictions. Reports of his alcohol abuse persisted, however, and during his brief spell on EastEnders in 2001, it was reported that the BBC was considering dropping his character if his drinking was not curtailed.

== Death ==
On 7 September 2002, Elphick died of a heart attack complicated by his drinking problem. He had collapsed at his home in Willesden Green, London, after complaining of pains. He was rushed to hospital where he died twelve days before his 56th birthday.

His funeral was held at Chichester Crematorium.

== Filmography ==
| Year | Title | Role | Notes |
|---|---|---|---|
| 1968 | Fraulein Doktor | Tom | |
| 1969 | Where's Jack? | Hogarth | |
| 1969 | Hamlet | Captain | |
| 1970 | Cry of the Banshee | Burke | |
| 1970 | The Buttercup Chain | The Driver | |
| 1971 | See No Evil | Gypsy Tom | |
| 1973 | And Now the Screaming Starts! | Drunk | Uncredited |
| 1973 | O Lucky Man! | Bill | |
| 1978 | The Odd Job | Raymonde | |
| 1979 | The First Great Train Robbery | Burgess | |
| 1979 | Quadrophenia | Jimmy's Father | |
| 1980 | The Elephant Man | Night Porter | |
| 1983 | Privates on Parade | Sergeant Major Reg Drummond | |
| 1983 | Krull | Rhun | Uncredited voice |
| 1983 | Curse of the Pink Panther | Valencia Police Chief | |
| 1983 | Gorky Park | Pasha | |
| 1984 | Memed My Hawk | Jabbar | |
| 1984 | The Element of Crime | Fisher | |
| 1984 | Ordeal by Innocence | Inspector Huish | |
| 1985 | The Supergrass | Constable Collins | |
| 1986 | Pirates | Sentry | |
| 1986 | Valhalla | Udgaardsloki | English Dub |
| 1987 | Withnail and I | Jake | |
| 1987 | Little Dorrit | Mr Merdle | |
| 1989 | Asterix and the Big Fight | Crysus | English Dub |
| 1990 | The Krays | George in Prison | Uncredited |
| 1990 | I Bought a Vampire Motorcycle | Inspector Cleaver | |
| 1991 | Buddy's Song | Des King | |
| 1991 | Let Him Have It | Prison Officer Jack | |
| 1995 | Richard III | Second Murderer | Uncredtited |
| 2003 | Out of Bounds | | |

== Television ==
| Year | Role | Title | Notes |
|---|---|---|---|
| 1969 | Department S | Police Motorcyclist (uncredited) | Episode: "Who Plays the Dummy?" |
| 1970 | Parkin's Patch | Thomas | Episode: "The Link" |
| 1970 | The Roads to Freedom | Lieutenant of Chasseurs | 2 episodes |
| 1971 | The Misfit | Mike Halloran | Episode: "On Europe and Foreigners and Things" |
| 1971 | Albert and Victoria | Nigel Godfrey | Episode: "The Elopment" |
| 1971-3 | Armchair Theatre | Chopper/Robert Delmonds | 2 episodes |
| 1973 | Justice | Peter Rodwell | Episode: "Trespass to the Person" |
| 1973 | Orson Welles Great Mysteries | Gorenflot | Episode: "La Grande Bretche" |
| 1973-4 | New Scotland Yard | Al Farmer/Joss Adrian | 2 episodes |
| 1973-83 | Crown Court | Simon Chase/Frank Hollins/Neville Griffiths QC | 9 serials |
| 1974 | Coronation Street | Dougals Wormold | 2 episodes |
| 1974 | Second City Firsts | Policeman | Episode: "Pig Bin" |
| 1974 | The Brothers | Second Policeman | Episode: "The Guilt Beneath the Gingerbread" |
| 1974-5 | The Nearly Man | Ron Hibbert | 6 episodes |
| 1974-9 | ITV Playhouse | Various | 4 episodes |
| 1975 | Three Men in a Boat | Second Porter | TV film |
| 1976 | Hadleigh | Brian Ainsworth | Episode: "Favours" |
| 1976-82 | BBC2 Playhouse | Various | 3 episodes |
| 1977 | Holding On | Charlie Wheelright | 3 episodes |
| 1978 | Hazell | Griffiths | Episode: "Hazell and the Walking Blur" |
| 1978 | The Ghosts of Motley Hall | Captain Narcissus Bullock | Episode: "Narcissus Bullock's Ball" |
| 1978 | The One and Only Phyllis Dixey | Wallace Parnell | TV film |
| 1978 | The Sweeney | Jimmy Fleet | Episode: "One of Your Own" |
| 1978-9 | Play for Today | Thomas Venables/Peter | 2 episodes, including Blue Remembered Hills |
| 1979 | The Knowledge | Gordon Weller | TV film |
| 1979 | The Professionals | Sergeant Garbett | Episode: "Backtrack" |
| 1980 | Cribb | Sol Herriott | Episode: "Wobble to Death" |
| 1980 | Shoestring | Pete Johnson | Episode: "The Dangerous Game" |
| 1981 | Masada | Vettius | 2 episodes |
| 1981 | Private Schulz | Private Gerhard Schulz | Miniseries |
| 1982 | Andy Robson | Jack Carbaby | Episode: "Hue and Cry" |
| 1982 | Smiley's People | Detective Chief Superintendent | Episode: "A Mother's Assistance" |
| 1983 | The Kenny Everett Television Show | Various | 1 episode |
| 1983-4 | Auf Wiedersehen, Pet | Magowan | 3 episodes |
| 1984 | Oxbridge Blues | Curly Bonaventura | Episode: "Oxbridge Blues" |
| 1984 | BBC Television Shakespeare | Dogberry | Episode: Much Ado About Nothing |
| 1985-9 | Three Up, Two Down | Sam Tyler | |
| 1985 | Super Gran | Roly Roofless | Episode: "Supergran and the Sinner" |
| 1985 | Hitler's SS: Portrait in Evil | Ernst Röhm | TV film |
| 1985 | Jenny's War | Schumann | Miniseries |
| 1986-95 | Boon | Ken Boon | |
| 1991 | Stanley and the Women | Bert Hutchinson | Miniseries |
| 1993–1995 | Harry | Harry Salter | |
| 1994 | Murder Most Horrid | Bill Todd | Episode: "Smashing Todd" |
| 1995 | Treasure Island | Billy Bones | TV film |
| 1997 | Dangerfield | Brian Taylor | Episode: "Happy Families" |
| 1997 | The Fix | Peter Campling | TV film |
| 1997 | Pirates | Chief Inspector Hornbeam | 2 episodes |
| 1999 | David Copperfield | Barkis | Miniseries |
| 2000 | Metropolis | Brickhill | 3 episodes |
| 2001 | The Bill | George Stubbs | 2 episodes |
| 2001 | Baddiel's Syndrome | Drugs Tsar | Episode: "Calligrula" |
| 2001 | EastEnders | Harry Slater | 36 episodes |
