= USA: Land of Opportunities =

Film series by Lars von Trier

- Directed by: Lars von Trier
- Written by: Lars von Trier
- Produced by: Vibeke Windeløv
- Starring: Nicole Kidman; Bryce Dallas Howard
- Cinematography: Anthony Dod Mantle
- Edited by: Molly Malene Stensgaard
- Production company: Zentropa
- Release dates: 2003 (Dogville); 2005 (Manderlay)
- Country: Denmark
- Language: English

USA: Land of Opportunities is a series of films by the Danish screenwriter and director Lars von Trier. It was planned as a trilogy but only two films were made: Dogville from 2003 and Manderlay from 2005. The concluding film was supposed to be called Washington. The films are set in the 1930s in the United States, a country Trier has never visited, and follow a woman named Grace as she is confronted with abuse and exploitation.

Dogville and Manderlay were filmed in a studio in Sweden with minimal, highly artificial sets where chalk lines on the floor represent house walls. Nicole Kidman played Grace in the first film and Bryce Dallas Howard played her in the second.

== Dogville ==
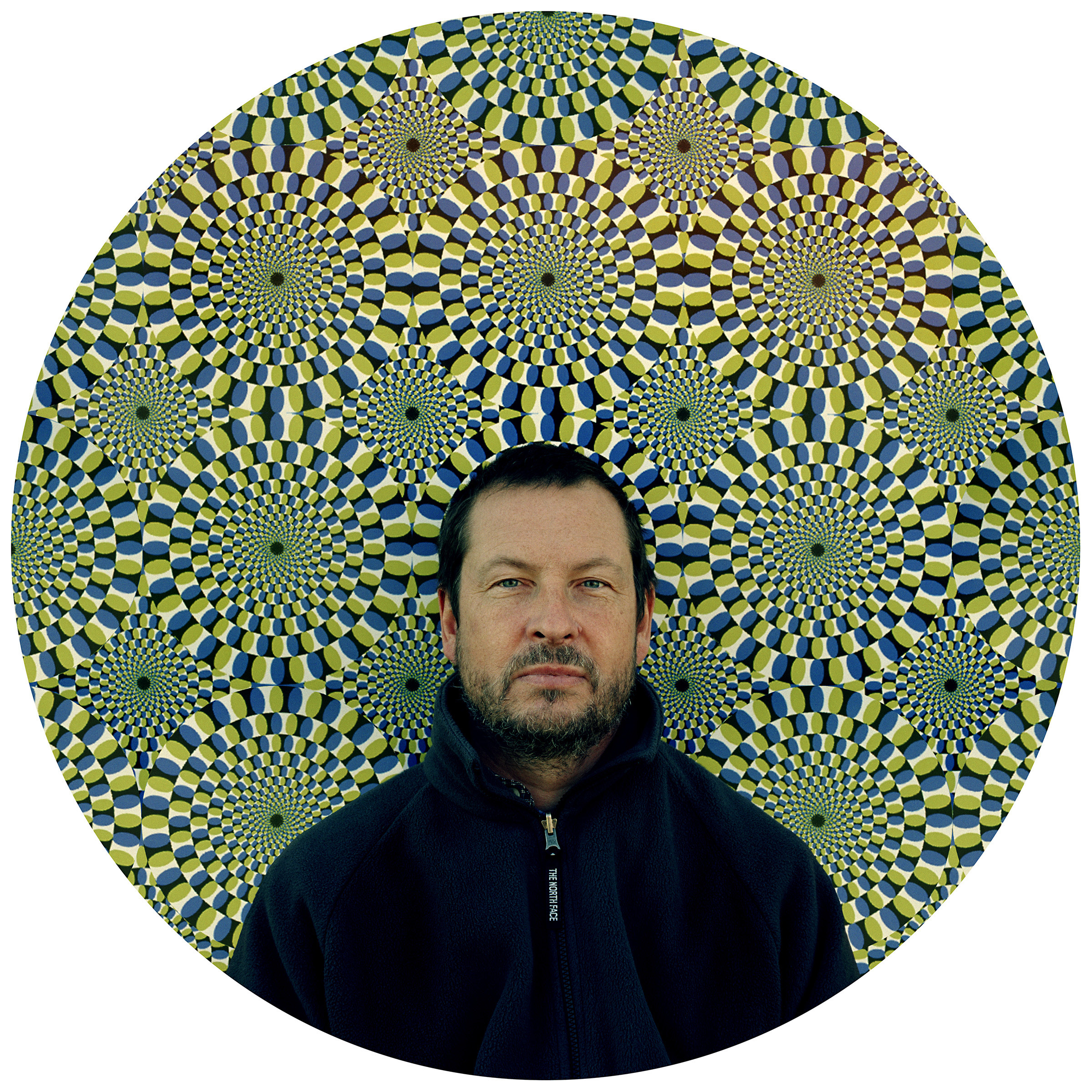
Lars von Trier in 2003

Dogville is set in a fictional eponymous town in the Rocky Mountains in the 1930s. It follows a woman named Grace as she arrives in the town, becomes established and, after a while, is increasingly abused by the locals. The film stars Nicole Kidman as Grace.

A source of inspiration was the song "Pirate Jenny" by Kurt Weill and Bertolt Brecht, where a woman revels in her contempt for other people and daydreams about ordering pirates to murder the entire population of her town. Dogville was filmed at Film i Väst's studio in Trollhättan, Sweden. It uses minimal sets where walls and other structures only are represented by chalk lines on the floor. It premiered at the 2003 Cannes Film Festival.

== Manderlay ==
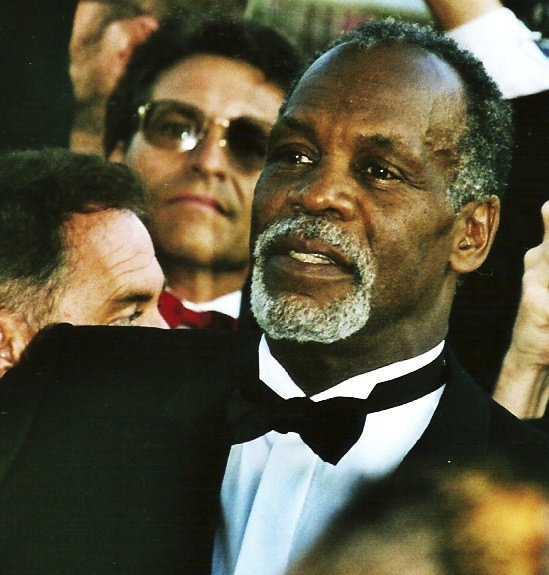
Danny Glover at the 2005 Cannes Film Festival

Manderlay takes place shortly after the end of Dogville and follows Grace as she discovers a plantation in rural Alabama where black slavery persists, around 70 years after the American Civil War. Grace is able to take charge of the plantation, which she tries to turn into an ideal workers' community based on individual liberty and racial equality, but fails. Kidman was originally set to reprise the role of Grace but dropped out due to a scheduling conflict. She was replaced by Bryce Dallas Howard. Other major roles were played by Willem Dafoe and Danny Glover. The film was shot in the same manner as Dogville, with sparse sets and chalk lines in Film i Väst's studio. It premiered at the 2005 Cannes Film Festival.

== Washington ==
The series was planned to conclude with Washington, sometimes called Wasington, but this film was never made. Trier has revealed few details about its story. It was supposed to take place in 1942, five years after Manderlay. According to the cinematographer Anthony Dod Mantle, it would be set at a government ministry.

Trier said in April 2005 that he was working on the screenplay for Washington and planned to film in Trollhättan again. In May 2005, it was reported that Trier wanted to cast both Kidman and Howard, who would share the role of Grace, but also that the film had been postponed because he needed more time to work on the script. He chose to film The Boss of It All in the meantime. At one point Trier wanted to take a break from filmmaking and do other projects, such as directing Richard Wagner's The Ring of the Nibelungen for the 2006 Bayreuth Festival. After that he planned to resume USA: Land of Opportunities and release Washington around 2008.

When asked what happened with Washington while promoting Antichrist at the 2009 Cannes Film Festival, Trier said he had no idea if it would ever get made. According to Dod Mantle in 2023, one of the reasons the film was not made was Trier's reluctancy to travel, especially flying which he has a phobia against. It was also during a time when Trier increasingly isolated himself and preferred to work remotely from his home. Dod Mantle says he was very excited about the project and at one point suggested to Trier that they could create a film studio on a ship and shoot Washington while travelling across the Atlantic.

== Reception ==
Many critics made a point of how Trier never has visited the United States due to his fear of flying, and it fuelled those who already had labelled him as anti-American for his 2000 film Dancer in the Dark. Trier responded that American subjects are relevant to him through the country's major influence in Europe, saying "I feel there could just as well be an American military presence in Denmark". He called himself "60% American" due to this influence on his own life. He said he knew a lot more about the United States than the Americans who made a film about Hans Christian Andersen knew about Denmark. Defenders of Trier's films pointed to Sergio Leone's spaghetti Western films and Franz Kafka's novel Amerika as comparable precedents.

Andrew Sarris of The New York Observer wrote that "America has always been as much of an idea and an illusion as a place" and that "it's an oversimplification to dismiss [Trier] as a fashionably European denigrator of America". Sarris likened Trier's version of America to that in Our Town by Thornton Wilder. He wrote that of Dogville and Manderlay, the former has "a much stronger and more satisfying storyline" and does not come off as anti-American, whereas the latter often is confusing.
