= Epidemic (film) =

- Danish theatrical release poster
- Directed by: Lars von Trier
- Written by: Lars von Trier; Niels Vørsel
- Produced by: Jacob Eriksen
- Starring: Lars von Trier; Niels Vørsel
- Cinematography: Henning Bendtsen
- Edited by: Thomas Kragh
- Music by: Peter Bach
- Production companies: Det Danske Filminstitut; Elementfilm A/S
- Distributed by: Angel Films
- Release dates: May 1987 (Cannes); 11 September 1987
- Running time: 106 minutes
- Country: Denmark
- Languages: Danish; English

Epidemic is a 1987 Danish horror film co-written and directed by Lars von Trier, the second installment of Trier's Europa trilogy, following The Element of Crime (1984) and succeeded by Europa (1991).

Co-written by Trier and Niels Vørsel, the film focuses on the screenwriting process. Vørsel and Trier play themselves, coming up with a last-minute script for a producer. The story is inter-cut with scenes from the film they write, in which Trier plays a renegade doctor trying to cure a modern-day epidemic. The film marks the first in a series of collaborations between Trier and Udo Kier.

== Plot ==
In a metafiction version of the film divided into five days, the first day of the protagonists sees screenwriters Lars and Niels lose the only copy of a film script (Kommisæren Og Luderen, "The Policeman and the Whore", a reference to The Element of Crime). They begin to write a new script about an epidemic: the outbreak of a plague-like disease. Another protagonist is a doctor, Mesmer, who, against the will of the Faculty of Medicine of an unknown city, goes to the countryside to help people. During the next days, the facts of the script join the real-life events in which a similar disease starts to spread. Lars and Niels go to Germany, where they meet Udo Kiev, who describes the Allied bombing of Cologne during the Second World War.

After the trip, Niels goes to a hospital where he undergoes a minor surgical procedure and while there tells Lars to go to see Palle, a pathologist who is performing an autopsy on a man who has recently died of an unknown disease. The last day, Lars and Niels have a dinner with their producer, to whom they reveal the end of the film, that Mesmer and his medical kit have spread the disease. The producer does not like the short twelve-page script, which has no violence, few deaths, and no subplots (which are common in Danish cinema). After that a hypnotist and a woman arrive in the house, to "help" writing the script, but the woman is overpowered by the visions of the script which are becoming real. She continuously screams and cries before everyone realizes that she has caught the disease that had been spreading in real life. She commits suicide with a fork, then another woman who shares the house with Lars and Niels dies, too, and Niels begins showing the signs of the disease.

== Cast ==
Excluding his portrayal of von Trier as Dr. Mesmer, most of the film's cast portray fictionalized versions of themselves:

- Lars von Trier
- Niels Vørsel
- Allan De Waal
- Ole Ernst
- Michael Gelting
- Colin Gilder
- Svend Ali Hamann
- Claes Kastholm Hansen
- Ib Hansen
- Anja Hemmingsen
- Kirsten Hemmingsen
- Cæcilia Holbek
- Gert Holbek
- Udo Kier
- Jørgen Christian Krüff
- Jan Kornum Larsen
- Gitte Lind
- Leif Magnusson

== Reception ==
The film was screened in the Un Certain Regard section at the 1987 Cannes Film Festival. It was nominated for Best Film at the Fantasporto International Fantasy Film Festival in 1988.

On Rotten Tomatoes, the film has a rating of 25%, based on 8 reviews, with an average rating of 5.4/10. On Metacritic, the film holds a score of 66 out of 100, based on 4 reviews, indicating "generally favorable reviews".

Robert K. Elder of the Chicago Tribune gave the film 3 out of 4, and wrote: "Will never be confused with von Trier's great films. But it is an intriguing introduction to his later cinematic obsessions". The Village Voice called the film "among [Lars von Trier's] better and most revealing movies". Chicago Reader gave the film 3 out of 5, and wrote: "Aside from the Pirandellian games and some interplay of different film stocks there isn't much going on here, though von Trier rewards the patient with a strange and horrifying climax".

== Home media ==
In 2023, The Criterion Collection released a 3K restoration of Epidemic as part of the Blu-ray box set, Lars von Trier's Europe Trilogy.

== See also ==
- Rat king (folklore)
- Bubonic plague
