= Golden Heart trilogy =

Film trilogy by Lars von Trier

- Directed by: Lars von Trier
- Written by: Lars von Trier
- Release dates: 18 May 1996 (Breaking the Waves); 20 May 1998 (The Idiots); 17 May 2000 (Dancer in the Dark)
- Country: Denmark
- Languages: English, Danish

The Golden Heart trilogy (Danish: Guldhjerte-trilogien) consists of three films by the Danish screenwriter and director Lars von Trier: Breaking the Waves (1996), a melodrama about sex and religion; The Idiots (1998), a Dogme 95 film dealing with moral conventions; and Dancer in the Dark (2000), a musical starring the Icelandic singer Björk.

The standalone films feature female protagonists and were inspired by the children's book Guldhjertet (lit. 'The Golden Heart'), which is about a poor girl who ends up giving away all her food and all the clothes she wears in order to help others. Each film premiered in competition at the Cannes Film Festival, where Breaking the Waves won the Grand Prix and Dancer in the Dark won the Palme d'Or.

== Breaking the Waves ==
Breaking the Waves stars Emily Watson and is set in the Scottish Highlands in the early 1970s. It follows Bess McNeill, a young woman with a history of mental illness, who belongs to a tight-knit Calvinist community and marries a non-religious and foreign oil-rig worker. When her husband is seriously injured in a workplace accident, he urges her to seek out other men as sexual partners. Bess complies, thinking it will improve his condition. The film premiered on 18 May 1996 at the Cannes Film Festival.

== The Idiots ==
Made according to the rules of the Dogme 95 movement, The Idiots is about a commune in a Copenhagen suburb. The residents engage in what they call "spassing", which is to pretend to have mental disabilities in order to attack the bourgeoisie and reach a state of innocence. The film follows Karen (Bodil Jørgensen), a woman with her own personal problems, as she engages with the group. The film premiered at the 1998 Cannes Film Festival.

== Dancer in the Dark ==
Starring the Icelandic singer Björk in one of her few film roles, Dancer in the Dark is a musical set in the United States in the 1960s. It is about a Czech immigrant, Selma Ježková, who struggles with poverty and a degenerative eye condition that slowly is making her blind. As Selma's life turns increasingly bleak, she enjoys Hollywood musicals and fantasises about a life inspired by them. The film premiered at the 2000 Cannes Film Festival.

== Reception ==
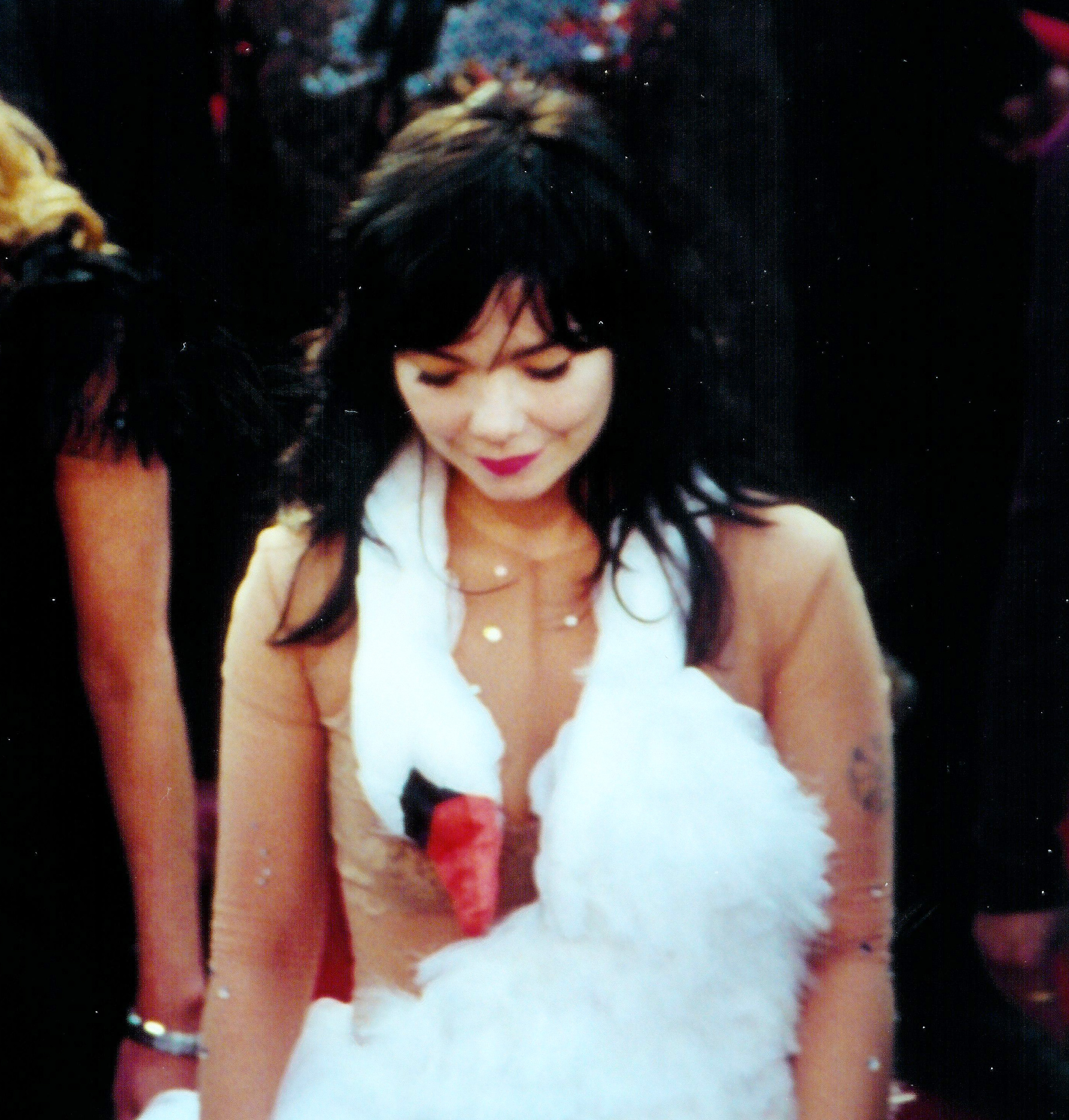
Björk in her swan dress at the 73rd Academy Awards, where Dancer in the Dark was nominated for Best Song

The three films were met with both controversy and positive reactions. In 2001, The New York Times described how they "routinely make critics' best and worst-film lists". Kim Skotte wrote in Filmmagasinet Ekko that the act of naming them the "Golden Heart trilogy" was a greater provocation than any of the content in the films. He traced their themes through the "banal and sentimental" picture book that was their direct inspiration to a recurring theme in fairy tales and in the New Testament, placing their endlessly caring protagonists in the same tradition as Mary Magdalene and Mary, "the Whore and the Madonna".

Breaking the Waves won the Grand Prix in Cannes, was a breakout role for Watson who was nominated for the Academy Award for Best Actress, and was described in Slate in 2009 as "perhaps von Trier's most widely acclaimed film". The Idiots became notorious for its unsimulated group sex scene. It was included in the Danish Culture Canon. Dancer in the Dark won the Palme d'Or in Cannes and was nominated for the Academy Award for Best Original Song for "I've Seen It All".
