= The Element of Crime =

- Theatrical release poster
- Directed by: Lars von Trier
- Written by: Lars von Trier; Niels Vørsel
- Produced by: Per Holst
- Starring: Michael Elphick; Esmond Knight; Meme Lai; Jerold Wells
- Cinematography: Tom Elling
- Edited by: Tómas Gislason
- Music by: Bo Holten
- Production company: Det Danske Filminstitut
- Distributed by: Kærne Film
- Release dates: May 1984 (Cannes); 14 May 1984
- Running time: 104 minutes
- Country: Denmark
- Languages: English; Arabic

The Element of Crime (Danish: Forbrydelsens Element) is a 1984 Danish experimental neo-noir crime film co-written and directed by Lars von Trier. It is the first feature film directed by von Trier and the first installment of the director's Europa trilogy — succeeded by Epidemic (1987) and Europa (1991).

== Plot ==
The film opens with Detective Fisher, a European expatriate in Cairo, undergoing hypnosis to process his most recent case, with the remainder of the film narrated by him in a dreamlike state. Expressionistic and surreal, the Europe of Fisher's hypnotized recollection is a psychosocial dystopia, dark, decaying, desolate, and rain drenched.

Chief Inspector Kramer has asked Fisher to return to Europe to investigate a serial killer who has been strangling and mutilating young girls. Osborne, Fisher's former but now disgraced mentor, had closed the case three years before, after the suspect, Harry Grey, supposedly died in a car crash with Osborne in pursuit. But now, there has been a new murder with the same MO.

Visiting Osborne, Fisher is bothered to learn that Osborne now disowns the set of crime-solving techniques he invented, controversial in the department, but which Fisher considers genius. Fisher intends to vindicate Osborne's techniques by solving the murders.

Osborne's techniques involve simulating the life of the criminal as closely as possible, in order to understand the inner workings of his mind. Retrieving an old tailing report describing Grey's journey between several cities, which Osborne had ordered burned, Fisher sets off to repeat Grey's journey.

In the first city, Fisher meets a prostitute, Kim, who he asks to simulate Grey's fiancé, who accompanied him on the trip according to the tailing report. Throughout the journey, Fisher keeps the same hotel rooms as Grey, wears Grey's clothing, and attempts to simulate his personality. He even has Kim painfully wrap strings around his head, to simulate Grey's frequent headaches.

By thinking like Grey, Fisher is able to discover a new body, and to predict the time and place of the next murder. He also learns that Kim had a child with Grey, whom Fisher had seen earlier at Osborne's home.

Fisher's prediction of the time and place of the next murder turns out to be accurate, as a young girl is soon contacted by a man claiming to be Harry Grey. Kramer's police force sets up a sting operation to capture Grey using the girl as bait. But instead of protecting the girl, Fisher separates her from Kramer, and strangles her himself. The true killer is Osborne: Grey really died in the car chase, but having successfully entered Grey's mind across the course of his own investigation, Osborne also acquired his murderous compulsions, and continued Grey's plans. Having replicated Osborne's techniques, the same thing has happened to Fisher.

Osborne hangs himself after writing a confession claiming responsibility for the murders, including the one committed by Fisher. Over Osborne's body, Kim and Fisher exchange knowing glances.

Fisher tells the hypnotist, "You can wake me up now," but hears no response.

== Cast ==
- Michael Elphick as Fisher
- Esmond Knight as Osborne
- Meme Lai as Kim
- Jerold Wells as Kramer
- Ahmed El Shenawi as Therapist
- Astrid Henning-Jensen as Housekeeper
- János Herskó as Coroner
- Stig Larsson as Coroner's assistant
- Harry Harper and Roman Moszkowicz as Portiers
- Lars von Trier as Schmuck of Ages
- Frederik Casby as White policeman
- Duke Addabayo as Black policeman
- Jon Bang Carlsen as Angry policeman
- Leif Magnusson as Hotel guest
- Preben Lerdorff Rye as Grandfather
- Camilla Overbye Roos and Maria Behrendt as Lotto girls
- Mogens Rukov as Librarian
- Gotha Andersen as Judge

== Crew ==
- Director: Lars von Trier
- Screenplay: Lars von Trier, Niels Vørsel
- Executive producer: Per Holst
- Production manager: Per Årman, Sanne Arnt Torp
- Director of photography: Tom Elling
- Shooting script: Lars von Trier, Tom Elling, Tómas Gislason
- Scenario consultant: Mogens Rukov
- Translation: Steven Wakelam, William Quarshie
- Camera operator: Søren Berthelin, Steen Møller Rasmussen
- Assistant director: Åke Sandgren
- Production designer: Peter Høimark
- Special effects: Peter Høimark
- Property master: Tove Robert Rasmussen
- Props: Peter Grant, John Johansen, Lars Nielsen, William Knutter
- Lighting engineer: E.g. Norre
- Gaffer: Jens Gielow, Flemming Bruhn Pedersen, Preben Seltoft, Birger Larsen
- Sound recordist: Henrik Fleischer
- Film and sound editor: Tómas Gislason
- Wardrobe: Manon Rasmussen
- Music composed by: Bo Holten

== Style ==
The film employs the film noir conventions of monochrome footage, apparently constant night, and the frequent presence of water, such as rain and rivers. The film is shot almost entirely in sodium light, resulting in images reminiscent of sepia tone, though with a more intense yellow. Because sodium lamps produce light in only a few narrow emission peaks, rather than over a wide spectrum, the film has an almost monochrome appearance. The sepia is occasionally contrasted with piercing blues and reds.

The world depicted in the film is semi-derelict. Disordered collections of similar or identical objects are found in many of the scenes, reinforcing the sense of a crumbling society. Examples include white paper, light bulbs, heaps of keys, surgical scissors, glass bottles, rubber stamps, and Coca-Cola cans.

The film's slow pace, dark visuals and occasional surreal imagery give it a dreamlike quality. In addition, much of the dialogue is contradictory. An example is one conversation between Fisher and his mentor's housekeeper:

Fisher: Is it always as dark as this at this time of the year?
Housekeeper: There are no seasons anymore. The last three summers haven't been summers. The weather changes all the time. It never alters.

In the opening of the film, a shot of a donkey lying on its back and then slowly struggling to stand may be a homage to a similar shot in Andrei Tarkovsky's Andrei Rublev (1966). von Trier has stated that he is an admirer of Tarkovsky's work:

I was very inspired by Tarkovsky. I won't make any bones about that. I saw an excerpt from The Mirror (Zerkalo) on Swedish television once, just a travelling shot around that house, and that was one of those 'I'll be damned' experiences.

== Reception ==
=== Critical response ===
The Element of Crime polarized critics at Cannes in 1984. On the review aggregator website Rotten Tomatoes, 83% of 18 critics' reviews are positive. Metacritic, which uses a weighted average, assigned the film a score of 66 out of 100, based on 6 critics, indicating "generally favorable" reviews.

Peter Cowie, in 2000, writes that "The Element of Crime heralded a new voice in film.... No film made by Lars von Trier is quite so mesmeric as this debut.... this expressionist ritual could have been made by Murnau, Lang, Pabst or any of the masters of German silent cinema" and concludes "The Element of Crime undoubtedly proclaimed a talent as unusual and compelling as any to emerge from Northern Europe since World War II."

In a review of the 2000 Criterion DVD for DVD Talk, Gil Jawetz wrote that the film "stands in such stark contrast to his later, minimalist work that it seems the creation of an entirely different artist". He called it "a difficult film" and said that "at times it is overly pretentious", but found it "most striking for its visuals", shot "through an amber filter, rendering the images almost monochromatic". Randy Pitman of Video Librarian described it as "a bizarre sepia-toned study in existential madness" and wrote that "the whole shebang doesn't quite add up to the proverbial satisfying experience", though he expected the "Blade Runner-influenced thriller" to "appeal to cutting edge cinema fans and completists". Dennis Schwartz of Ozus' World Movie Reviews gave the film a B, likening its look to Jean-Luc Godard's Alphaville and Andrei Tarkovsky's Stalker, and called it an "intriguingly stylish but cold film" that "satisfies more as a cinephile's delight than as a substantive true murder mystery tale".

=== Accolades ===
The film received several awards including the Bodil Awards and Robert Awards in 1985 for the Best Film. It received Technical Grand Prize and was nominated for the Palme d'Or at the 1984 Cannes Film Festival.

Organization	Category	Recipients and nominees	Result
Avoriaz Fantastic Film Festival	Grand Prix	Lars von Trier	Nominated
Cannes Film Festival	Technical Grand Prize	Lars von Trier	Won
Cannes Film Festival	Palme d'Or	Lars von Trier	Nominated
Bodil Awards	Best Film	Lars von Trier	Won
Fantasporto	International Fantasy Film Award for Best Director	Lars von Trier	Won
Fantasporto	International Fantasy Film Award for Best Film	Lars von Trier	Nominated
Mannheim-Heidelberg International Filmfestival	Josef von Sternberg Award	Lars von Trier	Won
Robert Awards	Best Cinematography	Tom Elling	Won
Robert Awards	Best Costume Design	Manon Rasmussen	Won
Robert Awards	Best Editor	Tómas Gislason	Won
Robert Awards	Best Film	Lars von Trier	Won
Robert Awards	Best Production Design	Peter Høimark	Won
Robert Awards	Best Sound	Morten Degnbol	Won
Robert Awards	Best Special Effects	Peter Høimark	Won

== Home media ==
The Element of Crime has been released on DVD in North America by the Criterion Collection. In 2023, Criterion released a 3K restoration of the film as part of the Blu-ray box set, Lars von Trier's Europe Trilogy. In Europe, a digitally remastered DVD is available as part of the box set Lars von Trier's Europe Trilogy – Hypnotic Edition.
