= Europa (1991 film) =

- Theatrical release poster
- Directed by: Lars von Trier
- Written by: Lars von Trier; Niels Vørsel
- Produced by: Peter Aalbæk Jensen; Bo Christensen
- Starring: Barbara Sukowa; Jean-Marc Barr; Udo Kier; Ernst-Hugo Järegård; Erik Mørk; Jørgen Reenberg; Henning Jensen; Lars von Trier; Eddie Constantine
- Cinematography: Henning Bendtsen; Edward Kłosiński; Jean-Paul Meurisse
- Edited by: Hervé Schneid
- Music by: Joachim Holbek
- Production companies: Det Danske Filminstitut; Svenska Filminstitutet; Eurimages; UGC
- Distributed by: Nordisk Film Biografdistribution (Denmark; through Constantin-Fox-Nordisk); Svenska Filminstitutet (Sweden); UGC Distribution (France); NEF Filmverleih (Germany)
- Release dates: 12 May 1991 (Cannes); 22 June 1991 (Germany); 16 August 1991 (Denmark); 13 November 1991 (France); 25 November 1991 (Sweden)
- Running time: 114 minutes
- Countries: Denmark; Sweden; France; Germany
- Languages: English; German
- Budget: DKK 28 million; (US$4 million)
- Box office: $1 million

Europa (known as Zentropa in North America) is a 1991 epic period drama film directed and co-written by Lars von Trier. A Danish-led production with co-producers from five other European countries, it is Trier's third theatrical feature film, and the third and final installment in his Europa trilogy, following The Element of Crime (1984) and Epidemic (1987).

The film features an international ensemble cast, including Germans Barbara Sukowa and Udo Kier, expatriate American Eddie Constantine, and Swedes Max von Sydow and Ernst-Hugo Järegård. This was German-born French-American Jean-Marc Barr's first collaboration of a series of films with Trier.

Europa was influenced by Franz Kafka's Amerika, and the title was chosen "as an echo" of that novel. The music, including the main theme, was composed by Trier's then brother-in-law and frequent collaborator Joachim Holbek, who also composed Riget (1994–2022) and Manderlay (2005).

== Plot ==
Just after the end of World War II, a young American of German descent, Leopold Kessler, comes to the U.S.-occupied zone of Germany and gets a job with his uncle as a sleeping car conductor for the railway company Zentropa. Fresh faced and idealistic, Kessler has come to work in Germany as his "small contribution to making the world a better place," but has difficulty adapting to German customs.

Kessler meets a young German woman, Katharina, the daughter of the founder of Zentropa, Max Hartmann. She points out bodies that have been hanged on trees outside the train, and explains that they are members of Werwolf, a Nazi guerilla terrorist organization that continues to sabotage the Allied occupiers.

Katharina invites Kessler to dinner at her half-bombed family mansion, where he meets her older brother, Lawrence Hartmann, and her father, Max Hartmann. Also present is U.S. Army Colonel Harris, who gives Max Hartmann a special survey: if it is found that Hartmann colluded in any capacity with the Nazi government, a near certainty given the scope of his operation, his company will be taken away from him. Harris recruits a hesitant Kessler to keep his eyes open for Werwolf activity on the trains.

Kessler does not have to wait long before discovering Werwolf activity, as a man claiming to be a friend of the Hartmann family gives Kessler two children to watch during his next train outing. It is then revealed that the Werwolf group recruited one of the boys on a suicide mission to assassinate someone on the train.

The day of the survey arrives. Colonel Harris secures false testimony from a Jewish American to claim that Max Hartmann rescued him from the Nazis, in order to rehabilitate the Zentropa founder, but Hartmann later commits suicide out of shame. Leopold and Katharina have sex, and she reveals that she was formerly a Werwolf: after leaving the group, they sent blackmail letters to her father, threatening to reveal her involvement.

Kessler stops the train in order to facilitate Max Hartmann's funeral, which is not permitted by the U.S. occupiers. After the funeral, Werwolf agents pull Kessler into a car, and formally ask him to join their side against the Americans, but he is hesitant.

Kessler falls in love with Katharina, who asks him to marry her. On their honeymoon, she reveals that Zentropa trains carried human transport during the war, the likely reason for her father's suicide. They settle into married life, and live happily for a time.

One day, Katharina is apparently kidnapped by the Werwolf group, who also kill Lawrence Hartmann. The group demands that Kessler use explosives to blow up the train during a bridge crossing.

Due to the stress of his wife's kidnapping, and deciding whether or not to bomb the train, Kessler flubs an important professional examination, infuriating his uncle. Kessler plants the explosives, and runs off the train. However, pity for the potential victims inspires him to climb aboard again, and disable the bomb.

Colonel Harris and the U.S. forces uncover the Werwolf cell, and Kessler finds Katharina in handcuffs. She was a Werwolf all along, and as well as faking her own kidnapping, she herself sent the extortionate letters to her father. She expresses disgust at Kessler's cowardice in refusing to commit to a side, and says Kessler should have blown up the train, because there are no innocent people in Germany—during the war years, its citizens either killed or betrayed.

Driven to despair, Kessler reluctantly decides to detonate the explosives after all. The train crashes into the river and several people are killed, including Kessler's uncle and Katharina. Kessler too is drowned in the sunken train, and floats out to sea.

== Cast ==
- Jean-Marc Barr as Leopold Kessler, a train conductor of Zentropa
- Barbara Sukowa as Katharina Hartmann, a femme fatale and superior of Werwolf
- Udo Kier as Lawrence Hartmann, Katharina's older brother
- Ernst-Hugo Järegård as Uncle Kessler
- Henning Jensen as Siggy
- Erik Mørk as Pater
- Eddie Constantine as Colonel Harris
- Jørgen Reenberg as Max Hartmann
- Benny Poulsen as Steleman
- Erno Müller as Heifer
- Michael Phillip Simpson as Robins
- Holger Perfort as Mr. Ravenstein
- Anne Werner Thomsen as Mrs. Ravenstein
- Lars von Trier as Jew
- Baard Owe as Man with papers
- Leif Magnusson as Doctor Magnus

== Style ==
Screenshot illustrating the film's use of black and white images mixed with colour, and of characters interacting with back projections.

Europa employs an experimental style of cinema, combining largely black and white visuals with occasional intrusions of colour (which later inspired Steven Spielberg's 1993 Holocaust film Schindler's List), having actors interact with rear-projected footage, and layering different images over one another to surreal effect. The voice-over narration uses an unconventional second-person narrative imitative of a hypnotist.

The film's characters, music, dialogue, and plot are self-consciously melodramatic and ironically imitative of film noir conventions.

Morando Morandini writes: "More than the characters, what counts is the technical-formalistic apparatus: color contrasted with black and white, superimpositions, distorting lenses, dynamic camera, expressionistic-style set designs. Anti-German in substance, it is profoundly German in form".

== Production ==
The film was shot throughout Poland (Chojna Cathedral (Marienkirche) and the Chojna Roundhouse) and in Denmark (Nordisk Film studios, Copenhagen and the Copenhagen Dansk Hydraulisk Institut). The cathedral where the main characters are getting married is that of Chojna, whose roof was destroyed by the Soviet army during the war.

Trier's production company, Zentropa Entertainments, is named after the sinister railway network featured in this film, which is in turn named after the real-life train company Mitropa.

== Reception ==
Europa was released as Zentropa in North America to avoid confusion with Europa Europa (1990).

=== Critical reception ===
The film received largely positive reviews from critics, with particular praise for its visual design, technical experimentation and atmosphere, although some reviewers found it emotionally remote or dramatically inert. Review aggregator website Rotten Tomatoes reports an 81% score based on 16 reviews, with an average rating of 7.4/10. Metacritic, which uses a weighted average, assigned the film a score of 69 out of 100, based on 15 critics, indicating "generally favorable" reviews.

Roger Ebert, reviewing the film under its North American title Zentropa, described it as a "strange, haunting, labyrinthine" work and wrote that von Trier's strength lay in the film's "astonishing visuals", including its combination of black and white, colour, double exposures and optical effects. Jonathan Rosenbaum described the film as "technically powerful, stylistically assured, and thematically provocative", while noting that it was "emotionally somewhat remote". Time Out characterized the film as "portentous but hypnotic", writing that its "grandiose scale and visual pyrotechnics" produced a paradoxically claustrophobic effect.

Other critics were more reserved. In the Los Angeles Times, Peter Rainer wrote that the film was "innovative in its technique but formalized and clammy as drama", and argued that although von Trier was "undeniably talented", Zentropa came across as an "exercise in pseudo-profundity" with "more metaphors than it knows what to do with".

The German film reference work Lexikon des internationalen Films gave a positive review, describing Europa as a mixture of thriller and melodrama that draws on classical genre models while exceeding them through its unusual visual design, and called it worth seeing for its sophisticated optical form. In a later essay for The Criterion Collection, Howard Hampton wrote that Europa was "the last beautiful, untrustworthy gasp of film noir" and "the first salvo of a postmod metathriller genre", emphasizing its deliberately manipulative style and its play with cinematic illusion.

=== Accolades ===
The film won three awards at the 1991 Cannes Film Festival (Best Artistic Contribution, Jury Prize, and Technical Grand Prize). Upon realizing that he had not won the Palme d'Or, Trier gave the judges the finger and stormed out of the venue.

In 1991, the film received the Grand Prix for Best Film at Film Fest Gent.

== Home media ==
The Criterion Collection released the film on DVD in 2008. The package contained several documentaries on the film and an audio commentary by Trier. In 2023, Criterion released a 4K restoration of the film as part of the Blu-ray box set, Lars von Trier's Europe Trilogy. Curzon Film also released their own 4K restoration in 2023 as a part of their Lars von Trier Collection box set.
