= The Boss of It All =

2006 Danish comedy film directed by Lars von Trier

- Danish theatrical release poster
- Directed by: Lars von Trier
- Written by: Lars von Trier
- Produced by: Meta Louise Foldager; Vibeke Windeløv; Signe Jensen
- Starring: Jens Albinus; Peter Gantzler; Friðrik Þór Friðriksson
- Cinematography: Automavision; Claus Rosenløv Jensen (First Assistant Camera); Henrik Lyngbo (First Assistant Camera)
- Edited by: Molly Malene Stensgaard
- Music by: Mikkel Maltha
- Production companies: Canal+; Det Danske Filminstitut; Film i Väst; Sveriges Television; Zentropa Productions; Zik Zak Kvikmyndir
- Distributed by: Nordisk Film Biografdistribution
- Release dates: 21 September 2006 (CIFF); 8 December 2006
- Running time: 99 minutes
- Countries: Denmark; France; Germany; Iceland; Italy; Sweden
- Languages: Danish; English; Icelandic; Russian
- Budget: €3 million ($4 million)
- Box office: $3.1 million

The Boss of It All (Danish: Direktøren for det hele) is a 2006 comedy film written and directed by Lars von Trier. According to the marketing material, the film was made with a technique invented by Trier called automavision, which automatically determines framing by randomly tilting, panning or zooming the camera without being actively operated by the cinematographer.

== Plot ==
The film opens with Lars von Trier, who is only visible via reflection, in a camera crane in front of a building telling the audience directly that this film is not meant to be taken seriously.

The owner of an IT company, Ravn, hires an out of work and Antonio Stavro Gambini obsessed actor, Kristoffer, to stand in for the boss of the company during a meeting to sell the company to another Icelandic company. The meeting goes horribly due to the Icelander becoming enraged about how Danes are too sentimental and talk too much. After the meeting, Ravn tells Kristoffer that Ravn himself is the boss but was too scared to be in that position. He had lied to the staff for 10 years, telling them that the real boss lived in America and had only contacted the staff via email so that he could blame all of their problems on "the boss of it all".

Kristoffer stays in the role for a few days, working with the staff until the next meeting to sell the company. Hilarity ensues as Kristoffer does not know anything that is going on in his interactions with the staff, such as a conversation with one employee referring to a vague question that he asked in an email. Not knowing what he said in the email, he says he was serious, only to find out that the email was a marriage proposal. Kristoffer meets with Ravn throughout the film in public areas to ask questions and get notes about his performance.

Lise eventually tells Kristoffer that the original six staff members all gave Ravn $25,000 each to help him start the business, so they all think that they own part of the company. However, Ravn has not told the six seniors that he is selling the company and plans to fire all of them and take all of the profits. Kristoffer thinks that this is wrong so he convinces Ravn to confess, only for him to tell the staff that it was the boss's idea.

In a follow up meeting with the Icelandic company president, Kristoffer tries to bargain for $50 million more than the original offer ($254 million), causing the president to storm out. They have a final meeting with the Icelandic company, in which the six seniors are present. During this meeting, Ravn finally confesses that he is the boss of it all. Everyone takes this news surprisingly well and they decide to not sell the company. But Kristoffer still has legal right as the owner and could still sell the company so he contemplates which option would be most in character. He ultimately decides not to sell, but upon the an Icelandic boss mentioning Gambini, Kristoffer becomes impressed and signs the deal to sell. The film closes with everyone packing up their things and leaving, while Kristoffer performs a Gambini monologue for the Icelandic boss.

== Cast ==
- Jens Albinus as The Boss of It All / Kristoffer / Svend E
- Peter Gantzler as Ravn, the owner
- Friðrik Þór Friðriksson as Finnur
- Benedikt Erlingsson as Interpreter
- Iben Hjejle as Lise
- Henrik Prip as Nalle
- Mia Lyhne as Heidi A.
- Casper Christensen as Gorm
- Louise Mieritz as Mette
- Jean-Marc Barr as Spencer
- Sofie Gråbøl as Kisser
- Anders Hove as Jokumsen
- Lars von Trier as Narrator

== Release ==
The Boss of It All opened in Denmark on 8 December 2006 and earned 1,147,632 kr. The film opened in the United States on 23 May 2007 and earned $51,548. Worldwide, the film grossed $3,111,395.

=== Critical reception ===
The film received generally positive reviews. It holds a 75% rating on the review aggregator website Rotten Tomatoes based on 67 reviews. The website's consensus reads, "Director Lars von Trier ditches the pretensions but keeps his misanthropy in The Boss of it All, a surprisingly sharp and witty comedy about office life gone haywire." On Metacritic, the film has a 71/100 rating based on 17 critics, indicating "generally favorable reviews".

=== Accolades ===
The film was nominated for two Bodil Awards, three Robert Festival Honours and the Golden Shell at the San Sebastián International Film Festival.

== Remake ==
On February 23, 2011, it was announced that Arrested Development creator Mitch Hurwitz was remaking The Boss of It All for Universal Pictures with Brian Grazer producing.
