= 26th Robert Awards =

2009 Danish film awards ceremony

- Date: 1 February 2009
- Organized by: Danish Film Academy

The 26th Robert Awards ceremony was held on 1 February 2009 in Copenhagen, Denmark. Organized by the Danish Film Academy, the awards honoured the best in Danish and foreign film of 2008.

== Honorees ==
=== Best Danish Film ===
- Terribly Happy – Henrik Ruben Genz

=== Best Children's Film ===
- Max Pinlig - Lotte Svendsen

=== Best Director ===
- Henrik Ruben Genz – Terribly Happy

=== Best Screenplay ===
- Dunja Gry Jensen & Henrik Ruben Genz – Terribly Happy

=== Best Actor in a Leading Role ===
- Jakob Cedergren – Terribly Happy

=== Best Actress in a Leading Role ===
- Lene Maria Christensen – Terribly Happy

=== Best Actor in a Supporting Role ===
- Jens Jørn Spottag – Worlds Apart

=== Best Actress in a Supporting Role ===
- Sarah Boberg – Worlds Apart

=== Best Production Design ===
- Jette Lehmann – Flame & Citron

=== Best Cinematography ===
- Jørgen Johansson – Terribly Happy

=== Best Costume Design ===
- Manon Rasmussen – Flame & Citron

=== Best Makeup ===
- Sabine Schumann & Jens Bartram – Flame & Citron

=== Best Editing ===
- Anne Østerud – Worlds Apart

=== Best Sound Design ===
- Hans Møller – Flame & Citron

=== Best Score ===
- Jeppe Kaas - The Candidate

=== Best Special Effects ===
- Hummer Højmark, Jonas Drehn & Thomas Busk – Flame & Citron

=== Best Song ===
- Kira Skov – "Riders of the freeway" – Terribly Happy

=== Best Short Fiction/Animation ===
- Cathrine – Mads Matthiesen

=== Best Long Fiction/Animation ===
- En forelskelse – Christian Tafdrup

=== Best Documentary Short ===
- Lille voksen – Anders Gustafsson & Patrik Book

=== Best Documentary Feature ===
- Burma VJ – Anders Høgsbro Østergaard

=== Best American Film ===
- No Country for Old Men – Ethan Coen and Joel Coen

=== Best Non-American Film ===
- Everlasting Moments – Jan Troell

=== Audience Award ===
- Blå mænd

=== Robert 25 Years Jubilee Award ===
- Ebbe Iversen

== See also ==
- 2009 Bodil Awards
