= 62nd Bodil Awards =

2009 Danish film awards ceremony

- Date: 1 March 2009
- Site: Imperial Cinema, Copenhagen
- Hosted by: Lasse Rimmer

Highlights
- Best Film: Terribly Happy
- Best Actor: Jakob Cedergren; Terribly Happy
- Best Actress: Lene Maria Christensen; Terribly Happy
- Most awards: Terribly Happy (4)
- Most nominations: Terribly Happy (4)

The 62nd Bodil Awards were held on 1 March 2009 in Imperial Cinema in Copenhagen, Denmark, honouring the best national and foreign films of 2009. Lasse Rimmer hosted the event. Henrik Ruben Genz's Terribly Happy was the big winner at the ceremony, receiving both the award for Best Film and for Best Actor and Actress in leading roles. There Will Be Blood won the award for Best American Film while Swedish Let The Right One In won Best Non-American Foreign Film.

Jørgen Leth received a Bodil Honorary Award and Kåre Bjerkø received a Special Award for having scored three of the nominated films.

== Winners ==
=== Best Danish Film ===
- Terribly Happy
  - Flame & Citron
  - Gå med fred Jamil
  - Lille soldat
  - Worlds Apart

=== Best Actor in a Leading Role ===
- Jakob Cedergren – Terribly Happy
  - Henning Jensen – Gaven
  - Thure Lindhardt – Flame & Citron
  - Dar Salim – Gå med fred Jamil
  - Ulrich Thomsen – Den du frygter

=== Best Actress in a Leading Role ===
- Lene Maria Christensen – Terribly Happy
  - Laura Christensen – Dig og mig
  - Trine Dyrholm – Lille soldat
  - Mette Horn – Max Pinlig
  - Rosalinde Spanning – Worlds Apart

=== Best Actor in a Supporting Role ===
- Kim Bodnia – Terribly Happy
  - Lars Brygmann – Terribly Happy
  - Finn Nielsen – Lille soldat
  - Henrik Prip – Spillets regler
  - Jens Jørn Spottag – Worlds Apart

=== Best Actress in a Supporting Role ===
- Sarah Boberg – Worlds Apart
  - Emma Sehested Høeg – Den du frygter
  - Ghita Nørby – Det som ingen ved
  - Paprika Steen – Den du frygter

=== Best American Film ===
- There Will Be Blood
  - The Dark Knight
  - No Country for Old Men
  - Vicky Cristina Barcelona

=== Best Non-American Film ===
- Let the Right One In
  - Børnehjemmet
  - Control
  - Gomorra
  - Everlasting Moments

=== Best Cinematographer ===
- Jørgen Johansson – Flame & Citron

=== Best Documentary Film ===
Burma VJ

=== Bodil Special Award ===
Kåre Bjerkø for scoring Det som ingen ved, Terribly Happy and øø Lille soldat

=== Bodil Honorary Award ===
Jørgen Leth

== See also ==
- 2009 Robert Awards
