= Fine & Mellow Productions =

Danish production company

- Founded: 2002; 23 years ago
- Founder: Thomas Gammeltoft; Hella Joof; Jannik Johansen
- Headquarters: Copenhagen, Denmark
- Products: Television series; Films
- Owner: Egmont Group
- Parent: Nordisk Film
- Website: finemellow.dk

Fine & Mellow Productions is a production company based in Copenhagen, Denmark. It is owned by Thomas Gammelgaard (66%) and Nordisk Film (34%), and produces both feature films and television drama.

== History ==
Fine & Mellow Productions was founded in 2002 by Thomas Gammeltoft, former producer and co-owner of Angel Production. The company's first feature film, Stealing Rembrandt (2003) sold over a quarter of a million tickets in its first week. Later successes include Hella Joof's comedy Oh Happy Day (2004) which was sold to Disney for a US remake and Henrik Ruben Genz's Terribly Happy which won both the Bodil Award and Robert Award for Best Danish Film of 2008.

== Productions ==
=== Feature films ===
- Stealing Rembrandt (Jannik Johansen, 2003)
- Oh Happy Day (Hella Joof, 2004)
- Chinaman (Henrik Ruben Genz, 2005)
- Murk (Jannik Johansen, 2005)
- Pure Hearts (Kenneth Kainz, 2006)
- Easy Skanking (Hella Joof, 2006)
- Terribly Happy (Henrik Ruben Genz, 2008)
- Hush Little Baby (Hella Joof, 2009)
- Rosa Morena (Carlos Augusto de Oliveira, 2011)
- Skyscraper (Rune Schjøtt, 2011)
- Excuse Me (Henrik Ruben Genz, 2012)
- Volcano (Runar Runarsson, 2012)

=== Television ===
- Lulu & Leon
