= Max Pinlig =

- Directed by: Lotte Svendsen
- Screenplay by: Tommy Bredsted; Mette Horn; Lotte Svendsen
- Produced by: Per Holst
- Production company: Asta Film ApS
- Release date: 5 December 2008
- Running time: 100 minutes
- Country: Denmark
- Language: Danish

Max Pinlig (Danish for Max Embarrassing) is a 2008 Danish film directed by Lotte Svendsen from a screenplay by Tommy Bredsted, Mette Horn and Lotte Svendsen, based on the Danish children's tv series Max that aired on DR1 from 2007 to 2008. It won the Robert Award for Best Children's Film at the 26th Robert Awards.

== Premise ==
Max has a crush on school classmate Ofelia, but he is too shy to tell her. Meanwhile, he becomes more popular with the cool kids at his school but has to stop hanging out with his old friends Esther and Hassan; the situation gets worse when Max's embarrassing mother intervenes.

== Cast ==
- Samuel Heller-Seiffert as Max
- Mette Agnete Horn as Max's mother
- Lars Bom as Steen Cold
- Louise Mieritz as Ulla
- Rasmus Bjerg as Carlo
- Anna Agafia Svideniouk Egholm as Esther
- Faysal Mobahritz as Hassan
- Ophelia Eriksen as Ofelia
- Signe Wenneberg as Signe Cold
- Anders Hove as Mogens
- Rasmus Berg Jensen as Nicklas
- Michelle Bjørn-Andersen as Marianne
- William Horn as William
- Sarah Muldgaard Enoch as Alma
- Lisa Littauer as Bibi
- Caroline Henderson as Ofelias tante

== Release ==
The film was released in Danish theatres on 5 December 2008 and sold a total of 163,473 tickets.

=== Accolades ===
Max Pinlig won the Robert Award for Best Children's Film at the 26th Robert Awards. At the 62nd Bodil Awards, Mette Agnete Horn was nominated for Best Actress in a Leading Role, but lost to Lene Maria Christensen in Terribly Happy.

== Sequels ==
Subsequently, the film received two sequels; Max Pinlig 2: sidste skrig in 2011 and Max Pinlig 3 på Roskilde in 2012.
