= Ditte & Louise =

Danish television series

- Written by: Ditte Hansen; Louise Mieritz
- Directed by: Niclas Bendixen
- Starring: Ditte Hansen; Louise Mieritz
- Country of origin: Denmark
- No. of seasons: 2
- No. of episodes: 16

Original release
- Network: DR1
- Release: 5 June 2015 – 16 December 2016

Ditte & Louise is a Danish comedy series that aired in DR1. The series is written and developed by Ditte Hansen and Louise Mieritz. It aired from 2015 to 2016 and was followed by the film of the same name released in 2018, developed by Nordisk Film.

== Plot ==
The series depicts Ditte and Louise's time in the acting industry, where they fight against chauvinistic and sexist tendencies.

== Cast ==
- Ditte Hansen - Ditte
- Louise Mieritz - Louise
- Henrik Vestergaard - Thomas
- Sasha Sofie Lund - Tilde
- Solbjørg Højfeldt - Inger, Louise's mother
- Viggo Korf-Hansen - Bjørn
- Henrik Noél Olesen - Arnold
- Jakob Cedergren - Sebastian
- Jesper Christensen - Ib

In addition, a series has a large number of guest appearances, including from Trine Dyrholm, Iben Hjejle, Lars Mikkelsen, Mia Lyhne, Joachim B. Olsen, and Keld and Hilda Heick.

== Production ==
Ditte & Louise was the first comedy series to be launched on DR1 in fifteen years, as the genre has been a more important element on its sister channel DR2. The production budget for one season amounted to 14 million kroner. The series draws inspiration from works like Klovn, Ridley Scott's Thelma & Louise, as well as Christian Braad Thomsen's Koks i kulissen with Helle Ryslinge and Anne Marie Helger.

Prior to the series, Hansen and Mieritz had collaborated as hosts of the Bodil Prize Party and as screenwriters for Cirkusrevyen. They have also worked on the play Den Vægelsindede which premiered at Odense Teater the same year as their series was aired.

== Broadcast ==
The series was launched on DR's main channel DR1, where it was shown on Friday at 21:25 (9:25 pm), seen in the industry as prime-time. The first season received a Robert Award for Best Short Television Series. Ditte Hansen and Louise Mieritz were in the process of developing a third season when DR1's channel manager chose to withdraw support for the series, based on its viewership. It was met with criticism from several media, including from Information who called the decision self-ironic. Mieritz expressed her surprise at the decision, as the series had performed solidly on streaming services.

== Episodes ==
=== Season 1 ===
All episodes of the first season are written by Hansen and Mieritz, and directed by Niclas Bendixen. The first season was launched on 5 June 2015 and ran for the next seven weeks.

No.	Title	Guest appearances	Airdate
01	"Fuckable"	Nicolaj Kopernikus; Troels Lyby; Anders W. Berthelsen	5 June 2015
02	"Koks i kulissen" "Coke Behind the Scenes"	Søs Egelind; Kirsten Lehfeldt; Søren Rasted; Nicolaj Rasted	12 June 2015
03	"A Room with a Dub"	Hilda Heick and Keld Heick; Carsten Bjørnlund	19 June 2015
04	"Nabo Barnet"	Basim	26 June 2015
05	"Hella Joof Syndromet" "Hella Joof Syndrome"	Christian Fuhlendorff	3 July 2015
06	"Gå Aldrig Tilbage Til En Fuser" "Never Go Back to a Dud"	Hilda Heick and Keld Heick; Jimmy Jørgensen	10 July 2015
07	"Merde!!!"	Helle Dolleris	17 July 2015
08	"Kvinde Kend Dit Flop" "Woman Know Your Flop"	Laus Høybye; Rune Klan; Tammi Øst; Mille Lehfeldt	24 July 2015

=== Season 2 ===
All episodes of the second season are written by Hansen and Mieritz, and directed by Niclas Bendixen. The first two episodes were shown on DR1 on 4 November 2016, after which the entire season was made available online.

No.	Title	Guest appearances	Airdate
09	"Den høje skøre og den lille sure" "The High Crazy and the Little Sour"	Silas Holst	4 November 2016
10	"Alle for Judith" "All for Judith"	Peter Aalbæk Jensen; Mick Øgendahl	4 November 2016
11	"Det er damebladenes skyld" "It's the Fault of the Women's Magazines"	Julie Zangenberg	11 November 2016
12	"Skoene med tæerne" "The Shoes with the Toes"	Trine Dyrholm; Lise Rønne	26 June 2015
13	"Upstairs, Downstairs"	Joachim B. Olsen; Simon Ammitzbøll; Anne Linnet	25 November 2016
14	"Dukkehjem" "Dollhouse"	Ulrich Thomsen; Rasmus Tantholdt	2 December 2016
15	"Ensom dame 40 år" "Lonely Lady 40 years"	Anders W. Berthelsen; Katja Holm, Christine Exner; Susan Olsen; Nukâka Coster-Waldau	9 December 2016
16	"Gitte & Lise"	Iben Hjejle; Mia Lyhne	16 December 2016
