= Ditte Hansen =

Danish actress and author (born 1970)

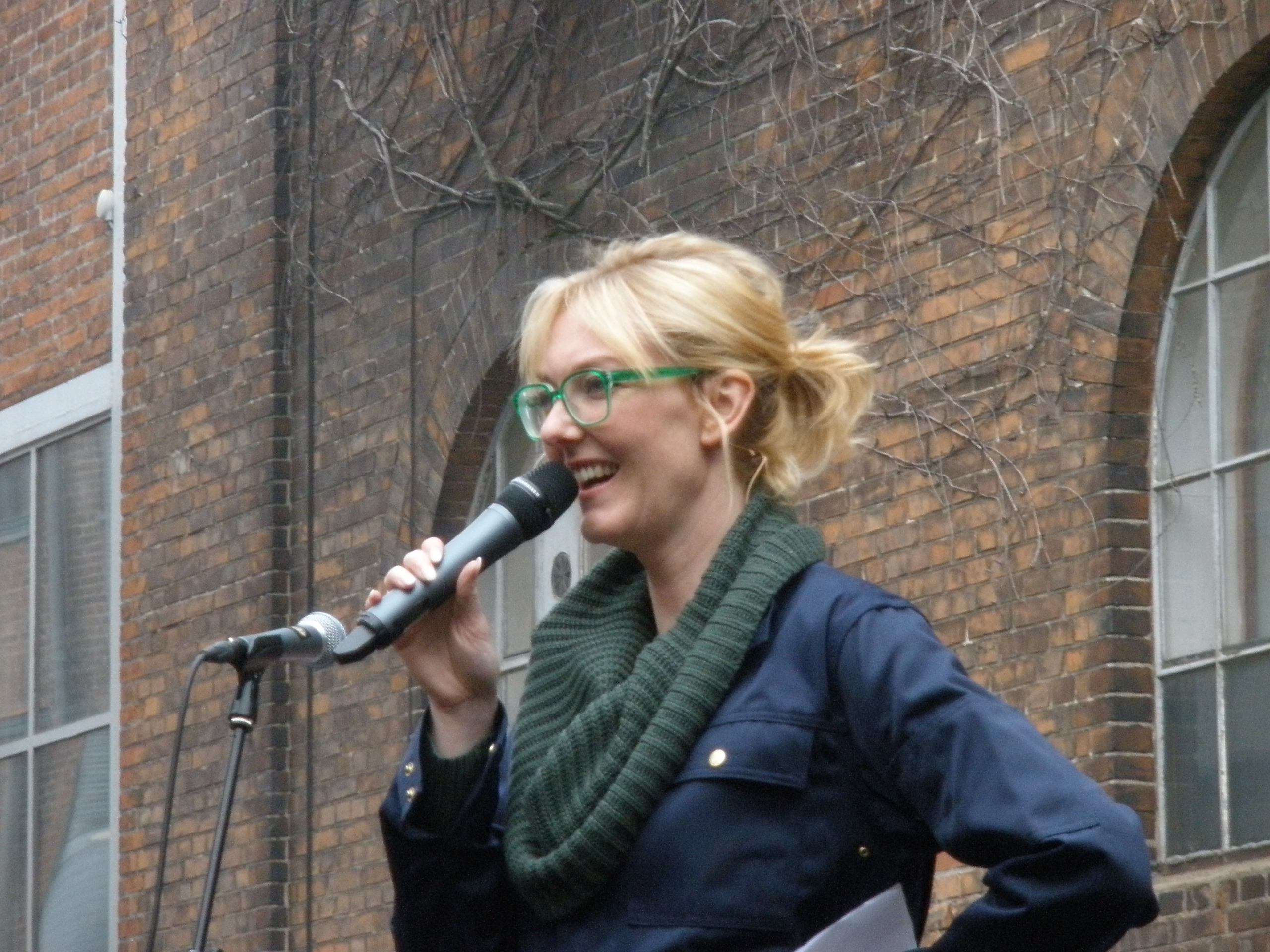
- Ditte Hansen performing at the opening of Kulturværftet, 10 October 2010 in Helsingør.
- Spouse: Benjamin Boe Rasmussen

Ditte Hansen is a Danish actress and author known for writing and starring in the TV series Ditte & Louise and its film spin-off as well as her appearances in the Cirkusrevyen.

== Early life ==
Hansen grew up with her father, an alcoholic, where he occasionally abused her as she attempted to calm him down. These events traumatised Hansen, as she sometimes goes to therapy to escape her past while having strong support from her husband.

== Career ==
Hansen graduated from the School of Acting at the Odense Theater in 1996 and from 1996 to 1998 was employed at the theatre.

Hansen made her film debut in Hella Joof's comedy-drama Oh Happy Day. She made her debut in the Cirkusrevyen in 2006. She hosted the awarding of Reumert of the Year in May 2010 and again in 2011. In 2012, she appeared on television as a forensic pathologist in Crime III and various roles in the satire program In the fence on DR1. She hosted the Reumert Awards in May 2010 and again in 2011. In 2012, she appeared on television as forensic pathologist in Forbrydelsen III and various roles in the satirical series I hegnet on DR1. Between 2015 and 2018, she wrote and starred in Ditte & Louise opposite Louise Mieritz, across two seasons and a theatrical film. In 2019, she published the book Gode Kasser.

== Private life ==
She is married to the actor Benjamin Boe Rasmussen.

== Filmography ==
=== Films ===
Year	Title	Role	Notes
2004	Oh Happy Day	Kirsten	
2005	Far til fire - gi'r aldrig op	Ms. Suhr	
2006	Lotto	Pharmacist	
2006	Helmer & Son	Vibeke	Short film
2007	Just Another Love Story	Kirsten	
2007	The Early Years: Erik Nietzsche Part 1	Philosophy teacher	
2008	Blå mænd	Hanne	
2010	Father of Four on Japanese	Ms. Suhr	
2010	My Sister's Kids in Jutland	Mother	
2010	Parterapi	Nanna	
2012	My Sister's Kids Home Alone	Mother	
2013	My African Adventure	Mother	
2015	Iqbal Farooq and the Secret Recipe	Psychologist Jeanette	
2016	Iqbal & Superchippen	Psychologist Jeanette	
2018	Ditte & Louise	Also screenwriter	
2018	Mødregruppen	Mother	State county worker
2019	Mom Squad	State employee	
2020	Dreambuilders	Helene	Voice
2021	Krummerne - Det er svært at være 11 år	Tina	

=== TV series ===
Year	Title	Role	Notes
2003	Er du skidt, skat?	Maja	
2008	Sommer	Daniel's mother	"Del 4"
2009	Pagten	Anne	
2010	Park Road	Dorthe	"Den frække stilhed"
2012	I Hegnet	Various roles	Also screenwriter
2012	The Killing	Lis Vissenbjerg	Season 3, Episode 3
2015–2016	Ditte & Louise	Ditte	Also screenwriter
2021	Try Hard	Tanja	
2021	Forhøret	Charlotte Lund	"Politiskolen"

== Revue and theatre performances ==
- Først bli’r man jo født at Dr. Dantes Aveny (1998)
- The Black Rider at Aalborg Teater (1999)
- Det fedtede slips – et Dan Turell show at Bådteatret (1999)
- No at Nørrebros Teater (2000)
- Party at Aalborg Teater (2000)
- Vækkelse at Kelejdoskop (2001)
- Jeppe at Aveny-T (2002)
- Bornholmerrevyen (2003)
- Stormen at Kalejdoskop (2003)
- Krig at Kalejdoskop (2004)
- Snart kommer tiden at Det Danske Teater (2004)
- Undskyld! (2005)
- Arbejddigfri.com (2005)
- Cirkusrevyen (2006–2013, 2015, 2017)
- Bitterfissen at Nørrebro Teater (2008)
- Shopping på Camp X (2008)
- Pornotopia (2009)
