= Hell Hole =

Hell Hole or Hellhole may refer to:

- Gates of hell

== Geography ==
- Hell Hole Gorge, a national park in Queensland
- Hell Hole, North Yorkshire, a pothole in England
- Hell Hole Reservoir, an artificial, crescent-shaped lake in the Sierra Nevada mountain range
- Hell Hole Swamp, a swamp in northeastern Berkeley County, South Carolina
- Hell Hole, a series of pools associated with the Popolopen Creek in Orange County, New York
- Hellhole (cave), a pit cave in West Virginia
- Hell Hole Cave (also referred to as 'IXL Cave' or 'Tom Sawyer Cave'), a cave in Wilder Ranch State Park, Santa Cruz, California
- Hellhole Wood, near Beamish, County Durham

== Entertainment ==
- Hellhole (1985 film), a women in prison film
- Hellhole (2022 film), a Polish horror film
- Hell Hole (2024 film), a creature feature
- Hellhole (novel), a 2011 science fiction novel by Kevin J. Anderson and Brian Herbert
- "Hellhole", a song by the Australian group Witch Hats
- "Hell Hole", a song by Spinal Tap from the 1984 film This Is Spinal Tap
