= Violets Are Blue (1975 film) =

- Danish: Violer er blå
- Directed by: Peter Refn
- Produced by: Anne Philipsen
- Starring: Lisbet Lundquist; Annika Hoydal; Lisbet Dahl; Baard Owe
- Music by: Bent Fabricius-Bjerre
- Distributed by: Constantin Film
- Release date: 2 June 1975
- Running time: 120 minutes
- Country: Denmark
- Language: Danish

Violets Are Blue (Danish: Violer er blå) is a 1975 Danish film written and directed by Peter Refn.

== Cast ==
- Lisbet Lundquist
- Annika Hoydal
- Lisbet Dahl
- Baard Owe
- Holger Juul Hansen
- Ulf Pilgaard
- Klaus Pagh
- Jørgen Kiil
- Claus Strandberg
- Lars Høy
- Birger Jensen
- Lone Lindorff
- Beatrice Palner
