= Niclas Bendixen =

Danish director

- Born: 8 April 1972 (age 54); Copenhagen, Denmark
- Spouse: Trine Dyrholm
- Children: 1

Niclas Bendixen (born 8 April 1972) is a Danish director and choreographer. He won the Reumert prize for the production of the play 69, and the musical En kort en lang. His first television series just aired on Danish national television DR1, the show is called Ditte & Louise which he directed all 8 episodes of the first season. At the moment his prize-winning show En Kort En Lang is running at Nørrebro theatre.

== Theatre ==
=== Director ===
- Rom (2024)
- Ulven kommer (TV series) -2 episodes (2020)
- Ditte & Louise (2018)
- Ditte & Louise (TV series) -8 episodes (2015-2016)
- En kort en lang (Theatre: Nørrebro teater) (2015)
- Rindal (Theatre: Mungo Park Kolding) (2014)
- En kort en lang (Theatre: Aalborg teater) (2013)
- Far (Theatre: Bellevue teater) (2012)
- Han hun vov og pelsen (Theatre: Cafe teatret) (2010)
- Elektra (Theatre: Betty Nansen) (2010)
- Birkehytten (Theatre: Mungo Park) (2010)
- Cirkus Summarum (2010)
- Romeo & Juliet (Theatre: Betty Nansen) (2010)
- Baby Blue (Theatre: Betty Nansen) (2009)
- 69 (Theatre: Holbæk/Stærekassen (2008)

=== Choreographer ===
- West Side Story (Theatre: Øster Gasværk) (2006)
- Havfruen (Theatre: Kaleidoskop) (2006)
- Matador (Theatre: the Danish Royal Opera) (2008)
- Den Eneste Ene - The Musical (Theatre: Forum) (2004)
- Faust (Theatre: The Royal Theatre) (2007)
- Come Together (Theatre: Øster Gasværk) (2009)
- Krop (Theatre: Bellevue) (2005)
- Cirkus Revyen (Theatre: Dyrehavsbakken) (2001/02/03)

== Film ==
=== Choreographer ===
- Druk (International Title: Another Round) (2020)
- Talenttyven (International Title: talenttyven) (2012)
- Den skaldede frisør (International Title: love is all you need) (2012)
- En kongelig affære (International Title: A royal affair) (2012)
- Dirch (International Title: dirch) (2011)
- Superbror (International Title: Superbror) (2009)
- Dansen (International Title: Everybody's Dancing) (2008)
- Der var engang en dreng (International Title: Skymaster) (2006)
- Mirakel (International Title: Miracle) (2000)
- Olsen Banden-sidste stik (1998)
