= Mørke =

Town in Mid-Jutland, Denmark

- Town
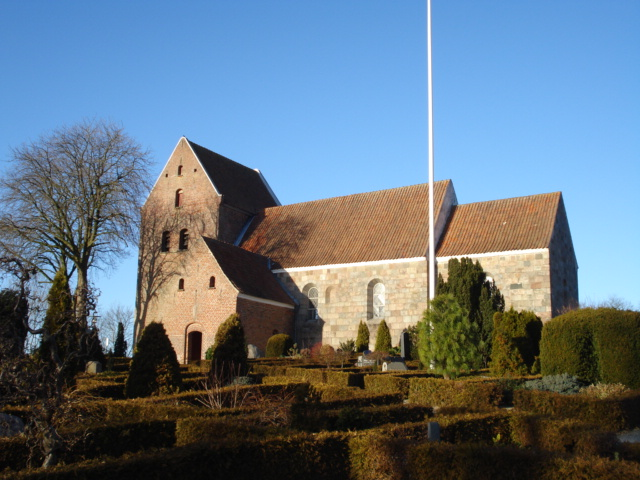
- Mørke Church

- Location in Denmark Mørke (Central Denmark Region)
- Coordinates: 56°20′12″N 10°22′41″E
- Country: Denmark
- Region: Region Midtjylland
- Municipality: Syddjurs Municipality

Area
  - Urban: 1.1 km^{2} (0.42 sq mi)

Population (2026)
  - Urban: 1,738
  - Urban density: 1,600/km^{2} (4,100/sq mi)
- Time zone: UTC+1 (CET)
  - Summer (DST): UTC+2 (CEST)
- Postal code: DK-8544 Mørke

Mørke is a town located in East Jutland, on the southwestern part of the Djursland peninsula, Denmark. It is a commuter town of the city of Aarhus, which lies approximately 26 kilometers to the southwest, and a railway town at Grenaabanen, the railroad between the cities of Aarhus and Grenaa. Mørke is located in Syddjurs Municipality, which in turn is part of Region Midtjylland, and has a population of 1,738 (1 January 2026).

Mørke is served by Mørke railway station, located on the Grenaa railway line between Aarhus and Grenaa.

The 2005 Danish film Murk (Danish: Mørke) by Jannik Johansen is named for the town.
