= Mikael Salomon =

Danish cinematographer and director

- Born: 24 February 1945 (age 81); Copenhagen, Denmark
- Years active: 1963–1992 (cinematographer); 1993–2021 (director)
- Organization(s): Directors Guild of America; American Society of Cinematographers

Mikael Salomon (born 24 February 1945) is a Danish cinematographer, director and producer of film and television.

After a long cinematography career in Danish cinema, he transitioned to the Hollywood film industry in the late 1980s, earning two nominations from the Academy Awards.

Salomon then transitioned to a television director career, with credits that include Band of Brothers, Salem's Lot, Rome, and The Andromeda Strain.

== Life and career ==
Born in Copenhagen, Denmark, Salomon is of Jewish descent on one parent's side.

Salomon photographed dozens of films in his native country, earning awards including the Robert Award and Bodil Awards. In the late 1980s, he relocated to Hollywood and shot his first mainstream American film with Torch Song Trilogy, a 1988 comedy-drama starring Harvey Fierstein, Anne Bancroft, and Matthew Broderick. The following year, he shot the James Cameron-helmed science fiction film The Abyss, a film that helped to pioneer the field of computer-generated visual effects. Salomon used three cameras in watertight housings that were specially designed. Another special housing was designed for scenes that went from above-water dialogue to below-water dialogue. The filmmakers had to figure out how to keep the water clear enough to shoot and dark enough to look realistic at 2,000 feet (700 m), which was achieved by floating a thick layer of plastic beads in the water and covering the top of the tank with an enormous tarpaulin. His work on the film earned Salomon a nomination for an Academy Award for Best Cinematography.

In the following years, Salomon shot some blockbuster films like Always, Backdraft, and Far and Away.

In 1993, Salomon directed A Far Off Place, an adventure drama film filmed on location in Namibia and Zimbabwe, replacing original director René Manzor after being recommended to producer Kathleen Kennedy by Steven Spielberg. That same year, he directed an episode of the short-lived science fiction series Space Rangers, beginning a career as a television director. In 1998, he directed the Emmy-nominated Aftershock: Earthquake in New York, the first in many television miniseries which Salomon would helm. The most notable of these was Band of Brothers, a 10-part series executive produced by Spielberg for which Salomon won a Primetime Emmy Award for Outstanding Directing for a Limited Series, Movie, or Dramatic Special and a Christopher Award.

Since then, Salomon has over thirty-five programs, including the miniseries adaptations of The Andromeda Strain and Coma broadcast on the A&E Network.

== Filmography ==
=== Cinematographer ===
==== Film ====
Year	Title	Director	Notes
1966	Søskende	Johan Jacobsen	With Rolf Rønne
1967	Fantasterne	Kirsten Stenbæk	
1967	Brødrene på Uglegaarden	Ib Mossin; Alice O'Fredericks	
1967	Me and My Kid Brother	Lau Lauritzen Jr.	
1968	Det er så synd for farmand	Ebbe Langberg	
1968	Magic in Town	Annelise Reenberg	
1969	Sonja - 16 år	Hans Abramson; Brandon Chase	
1969	De 5 og spionerne	Katrine Hedman	
1970	Five Get into Trouble	Katrine Hedman	
1970	Daddy, Darling	Joseph W. Sarno	
1970	Threesome	Brandon Chase	
1970	Tintomara	Hans Abramson	
1971	Welcome to the Club	Walter Shenson	
1971	Kid Gang on the Go	Annelise Reenberg	
1972	Rektor på sengekanten	John Hilbard	
1972	Motorvej på sengekanten	John Hilbard	With Aage Wiltrup
1974	Jorden runt med Fanny Hill	Mac Ahlberg	
1975	Violets Are Blue	Peter Refn	
1975	Kun sandheden	Henning Ørnbak	
1976	Hjerter er trumf	Lars Brydesen	
1976	Strømer	Anders Refn	
1976	Elvis! Elvis!	Kay Pollak	
1977	Mind Your Back, Professor	Jens Okking	
1977	Skytten	Franz Ernst; Tom Hedegaard	
1977	Bedside Freeway	Boerge Hilbarth	
1978	The Heritage	Anders Refn	
1981	Tell It Like It Is, Boys	Peter Curran	
1985	De flyvende djævle	Anders Refn	
1986	The Wolf at the Door	Henning Carlsen	
1986	Early Spring	Astrid Henning-Jensen	
1987	Peter von Scholten	Palle Kjærulff-Schmidt	
1988	Zelly and Me	Tina Rathborne	
1988	Stealing Heaven	Clive Donner	
1988	Torch Song Trilogy	Paul Bogart	
1989	The Abyss	James Cameron	
1989	Always	Steven Spielberg	
1990	Arachnophobia	Frank Marshall	
1991	Backdraft	Ron Howard	
1992	Far and Away	Ron Howard	

=== Director ===
Film

- A Far Off Place (1993)
- Hard Rain (1998)
- Freezer (2014) (Direct-to-video)
- Instrument of Hope (2020) (Documentary short)

==== TV series ====
Year	Title	Episode(s)	Notes
1993	Space Rangers	"Fort Hope"	
1998	Nash Bridges	"The Tourist"	
2000	The Fugitive	"Pilot"	
2000	The Fugitive	"The Hand of a Stranger"	
2001	Alias	"Parity"	
2001	The Agency	"Pilot"	
2001	The Agency	"Deadline"	
2005	Over There	"I Want My Toilets"	
2005	Rome	"The Stolen Eagle"	Uncredited
2005	Rome	"An Owl in a Thornbush"	Uncredited
2005	Rome	"The Spoils"	
2006	Nightmares & Dreamscapes	"The End of the Whole Mess"	
2006	Nightmares & Dreamscapes	"Autopsy Room Four"	
2006	Runaway	"Pilot"	Also co-executive producer
2009	Hawthorne	"Pilot"	Also executive producer
2010	Unnatural History	"Pilot"	Also executive producer
2010	Unnatural History	"Thor's Slammer"	
2011	Camelot	"The Long Night"	
2011	Camelot	"The Battle of Bardon Pass"	
2011	Camelot	"Reckoning"	Co-directed with Stefan Schwartz
2014	Falling Skies	"Exodus"	
2015	Blood & Oil	"The Birthday Party"	
2015–16	Powers	"The Raconteur of the Funeral Circuit"	
2015–16	Powers	"F@#K the Big Chiller"	
2015–16	Powers	"Caracas, 1967"	
2015–16	Powers	"Hell Night"	
2015–16	Powers	"Legacy"	
2016	Damien	"Seven Curses"	
2017	Six	"Man Down"	
2017	Six	"Blood Brothers"	
2017	The Expanse	"The Weeping Somnambulist"	
2017	The Expanse	"Cascade"	
2017	Criminal Minds: Beyond Borders	"The Ripper of Riga"	
2018	The Brave	"Grounded"	

==== Miniseries ====
Year	Title	Director	Executive Producer	Notes
1999	Aftershock: Earthquake in New York	Yes	No	
2001	Band of Brothers	Yes	No	Episodes "Carentan" and "Points"
2004	Salem's Lot	Yes	No	
2004	The Grid	Yes	No	
2006	Fallen	Yes	No	
2007	The Company	Yes	No	
2008	The Andromeda Strain	Yes	Co-executive	
2012	Coma	Yes	Yes	
2015	To Appomattox	Yes	Yes	
2017	The Long Road Home	Yes	Yes	Episodes "Into the Unknown", "In the Valley of Death" and "Abandon Hope"

==== TV movies ====
Year	Title	Director	Co-Executive Producer
2000	Sole Survivor	Yes	No
2001	A Glimpse of Hell	Yes	No
2002	Young Arthur	Yes	No
2003	Benedict Arnold: A Question of Honor	Yes	No
2007	Fallen: The Journey	Yes	No
2008	Flirting with Forty	Yes	No
2008	Natalee Holloway	Yes	Yes
2010	Who Is Clark Rockefeller?	Yes	Yes
2010	The Lost Future	Yes	Yes
2012	Drew Peterson: Untouchable	Yes	Yes
2012	Blue Lagoon: The Awakening	Yes (Note: Co-directed with Eric Bross (credited as "Jake Newsome"))	No
2014	Big Driver	Yes	No

== Awards and nominations ==
Academy Awards

Year	Category	Title	Result
1989	Best Cinematography	The Abyss	Nominated
1991	Best Visual Effects	Backdraft	Nominated

American Society of Cinematographers

Year	Category	Title	Result
1989	Outstanding Cinematography	The Abyss	Nominated

BAFTA Awards

Year	Category	Title	Result
1991	Best Special Visual Effects	Backdraft	Nominated

Directors Guild of America

Year	Category	Title	Result
2007	Outstanding Directing in a Movie for a Miniseries	The Company	Nominated
2008	Outstanding Directing in a Movie for a Miniseries	The Andromeda Stain	Nominated
2010	Outstanding Directing for a Children's Program	Unnatural History	Nominated

Primetime Emmy Awards

Year	Category	Title	Result
2001	Outstanding Directing	Band of Brothers	Won
2007	Outstanding Directing	The Company	Nominated
2008	Outstanding Limited Series	The Andromeda Strain	Nominated

Other awards

Year	Award	Category	Title	Result
1985	Danish Film Academy	Robert Award for Best Cinematography	De flyvende djævle	Won
1987	CableACE Award	Direction of Photography in a Miniseries	The Man Who Broke 1,000 Chains	Won
2001	Christopher Television & Cable Award		Band of Brothers	Won
