= Roses Are Red (disambiguation) =

Roses Are Red is a traditional poem.

Roses Are Red may also refer to:

In music:

- Roses Are Red (album), a 1962 album by Bobby Vinton
  - "Roses Are Red (My Love)", the title song
- "Roses Are Red" (The Mac Band song), 1988
- "Roses Are Red" (Aqua song), 1996
- Roses Are Red (band), a 2002 American alternative rock band

In other media:

- Roses Are Red (film), a 1947 film starring Patricia Knight
- Roses Are Red (novel), a 2000 novel by James Patterson

== See also ==
- Roses Are Red, Violets Are Blue (album), a 2004 album by Trocadero
- Violets Are Blue (disambiguation)
