= Kirsten Lehfeldt =

Danish actress

Kirsten Eli Lehfeldt (born 19 December 1952) is a Danish actress. After studying at the Aarhus Theatre School she appeared on stage in theatre productions and in a variety of reviews as a comic. In 1980, with her slim figure and penetrating singing voice she gained success in Aalborg (and later in Copenhagen) in the title role of Piaf representing the French singer Edith Piaf. In 1986, Lehfeldt made her film debut as the nurse Henriette in Helle Ryslinge's Flamberede hjerter, earning the prized Bodil Award for best actress. She has recently appeared in the comic Danish TV series Carmen Curlers and Guru. Since her partner Stig Hoffmeyer died in 2022, she has continued performing the role of Gerda in the TV series Minkavlerne, now in its fourth year.

== Early life, education and family ==
Born in Skanderborg on 19 December 1952, Kirsten Lehfeldt was the daughter of the politician Rolf Lehfeldt (born 1928) and his wife Inger née Stiig Jensen (born 1927), an auditor. After matriculating from Aarhus Katedralskole in 1973 she applied to attend Statens Teaterskole in Copenhagen but was rejected as the jury thought that at only 43 kilos she would be too small and her voice would be too weak. She was nevertheless able to study at the school attached to Aarhus Theatre (1973–76). From 1975 her partner was the actor Stig Hoffmeyer (1940–2022) with whom she had a daughter Mille Hoffmeyer Lehfeldt (born 1979).

== Career ==
On graduating, she performed over the next few years on stage in Aalborg, often taking comic parts. As a result of her vitality, she also proved successful in reviews, first in 1979 in Aalborg, later in Hjørring and in Copenhagen's Cirkusrevyen.

Widespread recognition came in 1980 when she played the title role in Piaf (Edith Piaf) at Aalborg Theatre and then in Copenhagen at the Nørrebro Teater. As a freelance stage actress, in the early 1990s she played in various Copenhagen theatres, for example at the Betty Nansen Teatret as Rita in the comedy Educating Rita and in Samme tid, næste år at Privat Teatret. She also performed more serious roles such as Natasja in Idioten (The Idiot) based on Dostoevsky's novel at Aveny Teatret and Winnie in Samuel Beckett's Happy Days at the Hippodrom in 1995.

Lehfeldt has been active in several Danish television series since 1984, including Landsbyen and Gøngehøvdingen and more recently Carmen Curlers and Guru. Her film debut as Henriette in Flamberende Hjerter (1986) brought her both a Bodil and a Robert award as best leading actress.

Grieved by the death of her partner Stig in 2022, she has nevertheless continued performing in the TV series Minkavlerne, now in its fourth season.
