= Frederick Schrecker =

Austrian actor (1892–1976)

- Born: Friedrich Schrecker; 10 January 1892; Vienna, Austria
- Died: 13 July 1976 (aged 84); London, England
- Other names: Fritz Schrecker, Franz Schrecker
- Occupation: Actor
- Years active: 191?–1976
- Spouse: Annie Wellisch (m. 1921; died 1967)

Frederick Schrecker (10 January 1892 – 13 July 1976) was an Austrian actor who appeared on stage, screen and film in his home country and the United Kingdom.

Having studied at school alongside fellow actors Fritz Kortner and Ernst Deutsch and trained at the Viennese Academy of Dramatic Art, Schrecker began his career on stage after 1910 as Fritz Schrecker, performing in Austrian-Hungarian provinces including Troppau. After the war, he worked on Viennese stages and performed at many theatres: Neue Wiener Buehne (for six years under the direction of Emil Geyer), the Wiener Kammerspiele, the Modernes Theater and the Theater in der Josefstadt (under the direction of Max Reinhardt).

Accepting a position in Germany, Schrecker became a demanded stage actor, appearing at the Kleines Theater, the Trianon-Theater, the Lessing Theater, the Theater am Nollendorfplatz and the Kabarett der Komiker. This led to having roles in German films "Der Feldherrnhügel" (1926) and "Die Koffer des Herrn O.F." (1931), the latter under the name Franz Schrecker. Partnered with Gisela Werbezirk, he directed several productions and produced numerous comedies with her.

As a result of the Nazi regime in Germany and the Anschluss in his home country, Schrecker, being Jewish, was forced to flee to England, subsequently anglicising his first name to Frederick. In 1939, he was a co-founder of the Viennese Theatre Club of Paddington, a "celebrated émigré cabaret and theatre", also known as Das Laterndl. The theatrical group of talented Austrian exiles, which included the likes of Lona Cross, Martin Miller and Marianne Walla became known for their sketches and plays, which represented a "satirical commentary on Vienna under Nazi rule".

During the Second World War, Schrecker participated in anti-Nazi information programmes for the BBC's German and Austrian radio service. After the war ended, he stayed in Israel for a while before returning to England in 1947.

Back in Britain, he appeared in many TV productions, including four of the six episodes of The Trollenberg Terror (as Dr. Spielmann) (but not in the feature film of the same name, The Trollenberg Terror), Dixon of Dock Green, No Hiding Place, The Four Just Men, Compact, Doctor Who: The Web of Fear, Callan and The Liver Birds as well as films too, such as Counterspy, in 1953, working up until his death.

== Filmography ==
| Year | Title | Role | Notes |
|---|---|---|---|
| 1926 | Grandstand for General Staff | Regimentsarzt | (as Fritz Schrecker) |
| 1931 | The Trunks of Mr. O.F. | | (as Franz Schrecker) |
| 1949 | The Third Man | Hansel's Father | Uncredited |
| 1950 | Murder Without Crime | Max | Uncredited |
| 1953 | Innocents in Paris | Porter | Uncredited |
| 1953 | Counterspy | Plattnauer | |
| 1954 | Johnny on the Spot | Otto Dessau | |
| 1954 | The Master Plan | Dr. Morganstern | |
| 1954 | The Divided Heart | Reporter | Uncredited |
| 1955 | Oh... Rosalinda!! | Gentleman | |
| 1956 | Foreign Intrigue | Mannheim | |
| 1956 | Breakaway | Professor Dohlmann | |
| 1957 | The Traitor | Suderman's Aide | |
| 1958 | Mark of the Phoenix | Van de Velde | |
| 1960 | Beyond the Curtain | Diener | Uncredited |
| 1961 | Taste of Fear | Plainclothes Officer | Uncredited |
| 1967 | Billion Dollar Brain | Old Man in Train | |
| 1967 | The Mini-Affair | Swiss Banker | |
| 1971 | Deviation | Old Man Taxidermist | |
