= Søren Spanning =

Danish actor (1951–2020)

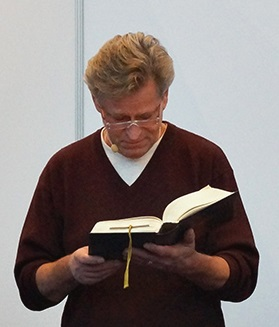
Søren Spanning

Søren Spanning (30 May 1951 – 12 February 2020) was a Danish actor.

== Life and career ==
He graduated from Aarhus Theatre in 1976 and was then employed at the theatre until 1980. From 1980 until 1987, he was part of the Royal Danish Theatre and throughout his career appeared in numerous plays, including A Midsummer Night's Dream, The Merchant of Venice, Hamlet, King Lear, The Seagull, Three Sisters, Hedda Gabler and The Father.

On television he appeared in numerous series including Strandvaskeren, Antonsen, Kald mig Liva, Bryggeren, TAXA, Karrusel, Skjulte spor, Hotellet, Forsvar, Ørnen Lærkervej, The Killing, and in three seasons of Borgen as Lars Hesselboe.

Spanning also had roles in various Christmas TV series including Alletiders jul, Krummernes jul, Brødrene Mortensens jul and Jul i Valhal. Spanning also provided the Danish voice for Lord Voldemort in the Harry Potter film series.

In 1995, he was appointed Knight of the Dannebrog.

Spanning was married to actress Karen-Lise Mynster. Together they had three children, among them actress Rosalinde Mynster and cinematographer Jasper Spanning.

== Selected filmography ==
- 1976: Kassen stemmer
- 1981: Har du set Alice?
- 1984: Min farmors hus
- 1984: Midt om natten
- 1992: Krummerne 2 – Stakkels Krumme
- 1993: Roser og Persille
- 1994: Krummerne 3 – Fars gode idé
- 2003: Lykkevej
- 2005: Jul i Valhal
- 2009: Headhunter
- 2010–2013: Borgen (TV series, 21 episodes)
- 2012: A Royal Affair
