= Kinamand =

2005 Danish-Chinese comedy drama film

- Directed by: Henrik Ruben Genz
- Written by: Kim Fupz Aakeson
- Produced by: Thomas Gammeltoft
- Starring: Bjarne Henriksen; Vivian Wu
- Cinematography: Sebastian Blenkov
- Edited by: Mette Zeruneith
- Music by: Gisle Kverndokk
- Production company: Fine & Mellow Productions
- Release date: 1 April 2005 (Denmark)
- Running time: 88 minutes
- Countries: Denmark, China
- Languages: Danish; Mandarin Chinese

Kinamand (English: Chinaman and Chinese: 中国先生) is a 2005 Danish-Chinese comedy drama film that deals with the Chinese immigrant experience in Denmark and marriages of convenience.

== Plot ==
Keld, a plumber, is bored with his job and life. His wife, Rie, tries to interest him in a vacation or dance classes. When this last-ditch attempt fails, Rie, tired of Keld's apathy, divorces him and asks for DKK 50,000 (US $8,817). Keld continues on his downward spiral, ignoring his customers and closing his business indefinitely. He sells all of his and Rie's furniture and lives in the empty apartment. When his food runs out, he starts eating at a Chinese restaurant across the street every night. A pipe in the restaurant breaks, and Keld agrees to fix it, in exchange for his meals. After about a month, the owner of the restaurant, Feng, offers Keld DKK 24,000 (US $4,000) to marry his sister, Ling, so that she can get a visa to Denmark. Keld initially refuses, but when faced with the divorce settlement, he goes back to Feng and asks for DKK 50,000, to which the latter agrees.

After a lavish wedding, Ling moves into Keld's apartment, which has been set up to fool the immigration service. Ling and Keld learn to live with each other, despite their language barrier. Keld freely tells his ex-wife and son that the marriage is purely "pro forma". He is concerned about Ling's health, but Feng assures him she's perfectly fine. Ling's influence gradually lifts Keld out of his apathy.

Rie attempts to reconcile with Keld. When that fails, she threatens to call the cops on Keld and Ling's marriage unless she gets her money immediately. Keld goes to Feng to get the funds, but Feng says the wedding cost too much and he doesn't have the cash. Angry, Keld storms home and has a fight with Ling, despite neither of them being able to understand the other.

Keld goes over to Feng's restaurant looking for Ling. A patron advises Keld that love must be professed. Feng comes through with the money, so Keld pays Rie and crushes any hope of reconciliation between them, as he is in love with Ling. When bringing his lunch, Ling overhears Keld practicing the words "I love you" in Chinese. That evening, washing the dishes as she waits for Keld to get up the nerve to say it, Ling collapses. Keld takes her to the hospital, but it's too late. Feng confesses he knew Ling had a congenital heart defect, the reason why he had wanted her to live in Denmark. Ling is cremated, and Keld flies to China to scatter her ashes in her ancestral river.

== Cast ==
- Bjarne Henriksen as Keld
- Vivian Wu as Ling
- Lin Kun Wu as Feng
- Paw Henriksen as Michael
- Charlotte Fich as Rie
- Chapper Kim as Zhang

== Awards ==
Kinamand won the Ecumenical Jury Award and the FIPRESCI International Critics Award at the 40th Karlovy Vary International Film Festival in 2005.
