= The Idiots (1998 film) =

1998 film by Lars von Trier

- Danish release poster
- Directed by: Lars von Trier (uncredited; under Dogme rules)
- Written by: Lars von Trier
- Produced by: Vibeke Windeløv
- Starring: Bodil Jørgensen; Jens Albinus; Anne Louise Hassing; Troels Lyby; Nikolaj Lie Kaas; Louise Mieritz
- Cinematography: Lars von Trier
- Edited by: Molly Malene Stensgaard
- Production companies: Arte; Canal+; Danmarks Radio; Nordisk Film- & TV-Fond; Scanbox Entertainment; Zentropa Entertainments2 ApS; Zweites Deutsches Fernsehen
- Distributed by: October Films
- Release dates: 20 May 1998 (Cannes); 17 July 1998 (Denmark); 27 August 1998 (Netherlands); 4 September 1998 (Sweden); 8 January 1999 (Spain); 29 January 1999 (Italy)
- Running time: 114 minutes
- Countries: Denmark; France; Italy; Netherlands; Spain; Sweden
- Language: Danish
- Budget: USD$2.5 million
- Box office: $7,235

The Idiots (Danish: Idioterne) is a 1998 black comedy drama film written and directed by Lars von Trier. It is his first film made in compliance with the Dogme 95 Manifesto, and is also known as Dogme #2. It is the second film in Trier's “Golden Heart” trilogy, preceded by Breaking the Waves (1996) and succeeded by Dancer in the Dark (2000). It is among the first films to be shot entirely with digital cameras.

It was screened at the 1998 Cannes Film Festival and was nominated for the Palme d’Or, despite being met with widespread criticism upon release.

== Plot ==
A seemingly anti-bourgeois group of adults spend their time seeking their "inner idiot" to release their inhibitions. They do so by behaving in public as if they were mentally disabled.

At a restaurant, the patrons are disturbed by the group's antics, which are barely contained by their supposed "handler", Susanne. The group refers to this behavior as "spassing", a neologism derived from "spasser", the Danish equivalent of "spaz". Unaware that the group is pretending, Karen, a single diner, is initially sympathetic to what she believes are their genuine disabilities. One of the group members holds her hand, compelling her to go along with them in a taxi. During the ride, she discovers their act, leading to a mix of discomfort and curiosity. Upon arriving at a large house, she learns that Stoffer, the apparent leader of the group, is supposed to be selling the property (which belongs to his uncle), but instead, it becomes the focal point for the group's activities.

The "spassing" is a self-defeating attempt by the group to challenge the establishment through provocation. The self-styled idiots feel that the society-at-large treats their intelligence uncreatively and unchallengingly; thus, they seek the uninhibited self-expression that they imagine a romantic ideal of disability will allow.

Stoffer, at his birthday party, wishes for a "gangbang", so the group members have group sex (without participation of Karen). Josephine wanders off separately, and is followed by Jeppe. The two privately engage in intercourse, in an awkwardly deep connection. However, the next morning, Josephine's father arrives. After chastising the group, he reprimands Josephine for not taking her medication and orders her to return home. Several try to stop her, including Jeppe who lunges himself desperately onto the hood of the car, but is ultimately removed after a tearful exchange between him and Josephine.

Then, an agitated Stoffer calls for the group members to let idiocy invade their personal daily lives. Most of the members refuse to take up the challenge and decide to leave the group, effectively dissolving it. But Karen decides to take up the challenge. Karen takes Susanne back to her house, where they are greeted with surprise by Karen's mother. Karen has been missing for two weeks, following the death of her young baby; she offers no explanation of where she has been. Karen attempts to spaz in front of her family by dribbling her food, but this results in a violent slap from her husband, Anders. Karen and Susanne leave the house together.

== Cast ==
- Bodil Jørgensen as Karen
- Jens Albinus as Stoffer
- Anne Louise Hassing as Susanne
- Troels Lyby as Henrik
- Nikolaj Lie Kaas as Jeppe
- Louise Mieritz as Josephine
- Henrik Prip as Ped
- Luis Mesonero as Miguel
- Knud Romer Jørgensen as Axel
- Trine Michelsen as Nana
- Anne-Grethe Bjarup Riis as Katrine
- Paprika Steen as High-class lady
- Erik Wedersøe as Stoffer's uncle
- Michael Moritzen as Man From Municipality
- Anders Hove as Josephine's father
- Lars von Trier (uncredited voice) as Interviewer

== Production ==
The Idiots is a co-production of companies from Denmark, France, Italy, the Netherlands, Spain, and Sweden. It was filmed during May and June 1997. The script was written over just four days, between 16-19 May. A Sony DCR-VX1000 was used for filming, operated by Trier himself.

== Style ==
The confession of a Dogme 95 film is an idea adapted by Thomas Vinterberg in the first Dogme 95 film: Make a confession if there were things happening on the shoot which are not in accordance with the strict interpretation of the Dogme 95 rules. It is written from the director's point of view. Accordingly, Trier made the following confession:

In relation to the production of Dogme 2 "The Idiots", I confess:

- To have used a stand-in in one case only (the sexual intercourse scene).
- To have organised payment of cash to the actors for shopping of accessories (food).
- To have intervened with the location (by moving sources of light – candlelight – to achieve exposure).
- To have been aware of the fact that the production had entered into an agreement of leasing a car (without the knowledge of the involved actor).

All in all, and apart from the above, I feel to have lived up to the intentions and rules of the manifesto: Dogme95.

In order to not violate Dogme 95 rule 2, forbidding the use of non-diegetic music, a harmonica player was recorded during the shooting of some scenes, including the end credits, even if he is not seen onscreen.

== Release ==
The Idiots provoked a storm of publicity and debates, one of which was about the fictional representation of disability. Film critic Mark Kermode's reaction was to shout "Il est merde! Il est merde! (sic)" from the back of the auditorium during the official screening of the film at Cannes, a spontaneous review for which he was ejected from the venue.

Channel 4 aired the film unedited in 2005 as part of the channel's "Banned" season exploring censorship and cinematic works. Viewer complaints prompted an Ofcom investigation, which came out in favour of Channel 4. In its ruling, Ofcom found the film "not in breach" of the relevant Code under the specific circumstances of the broadcast, that is "the serious contextualisation of the film within a season examining the censorship of film and television, its artistic purpose, the channel which transmitted it, the strong warnings before the film and prior to the scene in question and the scheduling after midnight". Ofcom added the caveat that "while we do not consider the film was in breach of the Code on this occasion, we must consider carefully the acceptability of any similar content on an individual basis".

The film is classified as adult-only in Argentina, Australia (though it has been shown uncut on TV with an MA rating), Chile, New Zealand, Norway, South Korea, Spain, Taiwan, and the United Kingdom. In Switzerland and Germany, the film ran uncut with a 16-years rating in theaters, followed by a DVD release with the same rating and several uncut television airings. Following their acquisition of 11 of Trier’s films, Mubi theatrically released a 4K restoration of the film on June 16, 2023, in celebration of its 25th anniversary.

== Reception ==
=== Critical reception ===
On the review aggregator website Rotten Tomatoes, the film has a 73% score based on 33 reviews. The website's consensus reads, "The Idiots feels more like an experiment than a coherent narrative, but director Lars von Trier's provocative style and rumination on civilization will leave most audience members feeling like satisfied test subjects". Metacritic reports a 48 out of 100 rating based on 17 critics, indicating "mixed or average reviews". Reactions to the film ranged from strong criticism to strong praise. A.O. Scott wrote a critical review in The New York Times, calling the film "a two-hour, semi-pornographic Mentos commercial" and singled out the final scene in particular for strong criticism, stating that the film "descends to truly contemptible emotional brutality". Conversely, Owen Gleiberman in Entertainment Weekly described the film as "a raw, funny, maddening ramble" where Trier "seeks catharsis by pushing everything to extremes" and described the final scene as "a gripping moment of high torment".

The Idiots was ranked #76 in Empire magazine's "The 100 Best Films of World Cinema" in 2010. The magazine had previously given it a full five star rating on its release in UK cinemas. It is listed as #941 in the film reference book 1001 Movies You Must See Before You Die.

=== Sexually explicit scenes ===
More controversy arose over the sexual content, which was unusually explicit for a narrative film. The Idiots contains a shower scene in which a member of the group (in character as an "idiot") has an erection and, later, a group sex scene that includes one couple (faces not seen, stand-ins from the porn industry) having unsimulated penetrative (vaginal) sexual intercourse. Both instances of explicit content are in view only for a few seconds. The film was cleared for theatrical release by the British Board of Film Classification, receiving an 18 certificate. When it was shown on Film4 (then FilmFour) in 2000, the erection and the intercourse were obscured by pixelization, following an order from the Independent Television Commission.

=== Accolades ===
The film was shown in competition at the 1998 Cannes Film Festival.

- Bodil Awards (1999)
  - Won: Best Actress, Bodil Jørgensen
  - Won: Best Supporting Actor, Nikolaj Lie Kaas
  - Won: Best Supporting Actress, Anne Louise Hassing
  - Nominated: Best Film
- Cannes Film Festival (1998)
  - Nominated: Palme d'Or
- European Film Awards (1998)
  - Nominated: European Film Award, Best Screenwriter
- London Film Festival (1998)
  - Won: FIPRESCI Prize, Lars von Trier
- Robert Festival (1999)
  - Won: Best Actress, Bodil Jørgensen
- Valladolid International Film Festival (1998)
  - Nominated: Golden Spike, Lars von Trier
