= Jul i Valhal =

Danish television series

Jul i Valhal (Christmas in Valhalla) is a Danish television advent calendar (or Christmas miniseries). It first aired in the December 2005 on TV 2 Denmark television station, on TV 2 Norway in December 2006 (with Norwegian subtitles), in December 2007 on Swedish Barnkanalen (with Swedish subtitles) and in December 2008 on Yle2 (with Finnish subtitles). As a television advent calendar, it has 24 episodes, and one new episode was aired per day from 1 to 24 December.

Jul i Valhal is primarily about two children named Jonas and Sofie, and their adventures with the Norse gods.

== Plot ==
The story begins with Sofie (Laura Buhl) being told by her single mother, Tove (Ann Eleonora Jørgensen), that they have to move to Singapore by the end of December for her job, and for her new boss, Mr. Tong. They have to stay with Ragnhild (Vigga Bro), Tove's mother and Sofie's grandmother, until that time because Tove has already sold their apartment. Sofie is gloomy because she does not want to move to Singapore, as she has had to constantly move around the world for Tove's job as an efficiency expert.

When they reach Ragnhild's house on a hill called "Loki's Hill", they find that the loft is being rented out to a woodsman named Asbjørn (Troels Lyby), who is also a single parent, and has two children named Jonas (Lukas Thorsteinsson) and Emma (Clara Bahamondes). Sofie and Jonas become close friends very quickly, but Tove and Asbjørn have a lot of tension and animosity between each other because their personalities are opposites. Tove has a great love of technology and business, while Asbjørn values nature and days of honest labour outdoors. While they often quarrel over the differences in their ideologies, they also quarrel over petty things; for example which side of the room they think the basket of chopped wood should be kept on (this, in particular, becomes a running gag throughout the series). Over the course of the series, the attraction between them increases and they gradually fall in love.

Sofie goes out exploring Loki's Hill, and finds an old dolmen surrounded by a ring of megaliths on the crown of the hill. She accidentally kicks a small rock into the dolmen, and afterwards she hears strange bell-like metallic noises coming from within. Startled, she runs back to Ragnhild's house. Over dinner that night, Sofie asks her grandmother why her home address is called "Loki's Hill". Ragnhild tells the children that it is because the legends say the old hill near the house is the place where the Norse god Loki is still chained. That night, before she goes to bed, Sofie looks out a window and sees a yellow glow emanating from the top of Loki's Hill.

Jonas and Emma go to school the next day, but Sofie feigns illness so she can stay home and explore some more. She succeeds in tricking Tove, who allows her to stay home. Then, Sofie goes back to the dolmen she found and crawls in. Inside, she sees a large stone snake decorating the wall, and in the middle of the cavern, she sees a man with long hair and beard chained (by both of his arms and by his neck), on his knees, and apparently sleeping (his eyes are closed and he is snoring). When Sofie tries to move the man's hair so she can see his face, he wakes up, and is surprised to see a person. He introduces himself as the Norse god Loki, and implores Sofie to unchain him. Sofie is frightened and runs back home, while Loki calls after her to not be afraid and to come back.

When Jonas comes home from school, he notices that Sofie has mud on her clothes, and knows that she was outside playing instead of healing indoors. The next day, Sofie goes back to the dolmen to see Loki again. Loki offers to give her a rune stick, which would have the power to cast a spell. Sofie wants a spell to heal Emma's sick rabbit. Loki makes a show of not being able to carve the runes into the stick, as his arms are chained. Sofie unchains one of Loki's arms, and he makes the rune stick for her. The spell works, and the rabbit is healed. Jonas finds the rune stick in the rabbit's box, and he is curious about where Sofie has been going. He confronts her about this, and she concedes, telling him about the dolmen and Loki. They gather together some goods to bring to Loki, including a razor, some men's underwear (both belonging to Asbjørn), and some scissors.

The following day, Sofie takes Jonas to see Loki while bringing him the goods they had gathered, and Jonas helps Loki shave his face. Sofie does not want to unchain either of Loki's two remaining bonds, but Jonas is tempted by the magical spells Loki has to offer, so he returns to the dolmen later, without Sofie. Then, Jonas has Loki make a rune stick for him that would make his father change his mind about technology and get a television, in exchange for Jonas unchaining Loki's other arm. Loki's spell works, and Asbjørn promptly purchases a large television, and Jonas tells Sofie what he has done.

Sofie soon realizes that she could have Loki make a spell which would keep her from having to move to Singapore. Loki says this would be a simple spell for him to make, but she would have to unchain his final bond. Sofie begins to, but decides against it and runs back to the house, again with Loki calling after her to come back. She talks to Jonas about it, and Jonas is disappointed that she did not get the spell, because he has become very close to Sofie. He again goes to the dolmen without Sofie knowing, and tells Loki that he is willing to unchain him for the rune stick he had made for Sofie, and proceeds to do so. However, Tove shows no sign of staying in Denmark, and even prints out a picture of the Singaporean hotel in which they will be staying, and shows it to Sofie, pointing out their exact room. Sofie is upset with Jonas for having been tricked so easily.

The two return to the dolmen to see if Loki is still there, but he is not. While they stand there, a heavy snow begins to fall. Back at the house, Ragnhild comments that the snow is so heavy that it is almost like Fimbulwinter. She tells the children that Fimbulwinter is the harbinger of Ragnarok, which she describes as the battle in which all humans, gods, and giants will die, but she adds, it won't come until Loki has been freed from his chains. This makes Jonas and Sofie worried, because they know Loki has truly been freed.

Sofie and Jonas then set up a hideout in Loki's old dolmen where they can make plans on how to stop Loki, and effectively stop Ragnarok. They then discover a tunnel behind the stone snake that leads to Asgard. They ask the gods about Loki, but none of them want to talk about him. Jonas and Sofie do not tell them that Loki has escaped because they are afraid. They decide that the one friendly place where Loki must be hiding is in Hel, the land of the goddess Hel. They then travel there, and meet Hel and Balder, the latter telling them that Loki is indeed hiding out there.

Soon after, however, Loki travels to Utgard to corroborate Ragnarok plans with the giant Thrym. The gods refuse to tell them how to get there (saying it is no place for children), but Jonas and Sofie manage to trick Heimdall into telling them how to get to Utgard. Jonas and Sofie then disguise as scullery maids to spy on Loki and Thrym. They learn that Loki still needs one last thing before he can start Ragnarok. The gods tell them that Loki cannot start Ragnarok without the Fenris Wolf, and they decide this must be it. They figure out that their grandmother's dog, Snifer, is actually Fenris (and that "Snifer" is actually just an anagram of Fenris), so they rush back to the house to get Snifer. Meanwhile, Loki gets into the house first by disguising as a delivery boy, and he takes Snifer before the children can get home.

Back in Utgard, Thrym decides that he doesn't need Loki anymore, since he has the Fenris wolf, and the Fimbulwinter is well underway. He and Loki had originally agreed that, after the battle, Loki would rule Asgard and Thrym would rule Jotunheim. Thrym now says, however, that he intends to rule both Asgard and Jotunheim himself. Loki decides that it is not worth it to fight his family anymore, begins to regret having started Ragnarok, and flees to Midgard.

Returning to Midgard, Loki meets Sofie and Jonas, as they have been spending a lot of time in his dolmen. At first they are angry with him, but after Loki explains his plight they decide to work together to stop Ragnarok. Jonas and Sofie find out that if any part of the prophecy of Ragnarok is broken or contradicted, the entire prophecy is rendered bunk. Otherwise, so long as all the conditions are met, it will be unstoppable. They decide that they should get at least one of the gods to forgive Loki, because one of the conditions in the prophecy is that none of the gods forgive him.

They disguise Loki as Sofie's grandmother, and take him to Asgard to seek forgiveness. All of the gods refuse to forgive Loki. Odin easily recognizes Loki through his disguise, and apprehends him. Jonas and Sofie return to Midgard. They are about to give up hope, when they remember that one of the gods was not in Asgard: Balder. They go back to Hel, and this time Emma sees them and follows them. Since time is running short, they do not take her back home. In Hel, Balder says that he would gladly forgive Loki.

Hel says she will only let Balder go to Asgard to forgive Loki if they leave Emma behind as insurance that Balder will come back. They agree, and Balder forgives Loki in Asgard, meanwhile Emma stays behind playing games with Hel. This breaks the prophecy, and a different future is then possible. Thus, Ragnarok is avoided before any of the gods are harmed. Odin, after seeing his beloved son Balder forgive Loki, also forgives Loki.

The gods then celebrate Yule late, because Fimbulwinter pushed the winter solstice back. Odin is sad because he had seen his son Balder again after many years, but he quickly had to leave. But, since Hel was invited to the Yule celebrations this year (previously the other gods had excluded her because they considered her to be strange), she allowed Balder to come along with her, and Odin rejoices in seeing his son again. Jonas and Sofie give the gods various gifts: Heimdall gets polish for Gjallarhorn, Sif gets a mirror, Idun gets hair spray, Freya gets Sofie's charm bracelet, and Loki gets an electric razor. Loki asks why Sofie seems sad, and she explains that she still has to leave for Singapore.

Back at Ragnhild's house, Sofie does not enjoy her Christmas dinner, because she is constantly thinking about the move to Singapore. They hear the taxicab arrive in the middle of dinner, so Sofie and Tove go outside, but the cabby is actually Loki in disguise. Loki decided that owed Sofie a favour, so he has Tove quit her job and they do not move to Singapore. Jonas and Sofie are happy that they can continue to be friends, and Asbjørn is happy that Tove will stay with him.

== Characters ==
=== Humans ===
- Sofie is an independent 12-year-old girl who lives with her mother, Tove, in Copenhagen.
- Jonas is a quiet 13-year-old boy who lives with his father (Asbjørn), his sister (Emma), and Ragnhild (who owns the house Asbjørn is renting). He is more impulsive than Sofie, as he is more willing to unchain Loki in exchange for various spells.
- Tove is Sofie's mother, and is a very career-oriented person who likes to take control of situations. Throughout the series, she is constantly seen working on her computer at her work station and talking on her mobile phone to her boss, Mr. Tong.
- Asbjørn is Jonas' and Emma's father who is from Jutland, and who rents the loft of Ragnhild's house to live in. He enjoys nature and is very down to earth.
- Emma is Jonas' little sister. Throughout the series, she is very excited for Christmas, and is often seen preparing for Christmas with Ragnhild. She loves Ragnhild's dog Snifer, and gives him one cookie each day.
- Ragnhild is Tove's mother. She knows much about Norse mythology, and is constantly telling different myths to Jonas and Sofie.

=== Gods ===
- Loki is the Norse trickster god. He acts very kind towards Jonas and Sofie to befriend them, so he can convince them to unchain him. After they do so, however, he immediately leaves so he can begin Ragnarok with Thrym, and the children realize that he had used them, but after Loki is betrayed by Thrym, he is good for the rest of the series: helping the children and trying to stop Ragnarok.
- Heimdall is naive, cowardly, and easily fooled. In addition, he is portrayed as extremely effeminate, and is (along with Loki) the source of a lot of the series' comic relief. He is usually seen polishing Gjallarhorn.
- Odin is the king of the Norse gods, and is very wise. He gives the runes to Jonas and Sofie so they can translate the various clues they find. Although initially he refuses to forgive Loki, after his son Balder forgives him, he does likewise
- Thor, Odin's son, is very loud, intimidating, and aggressive throughout the series. Always shouting, he is quick to lose his temper, and is also very quick to use force or brandish his hammer, Mjolnir (which he tends to lose), in order to get his way.
- Balder is Odin's son, and is very beautiful and innocent. Sofie seems to have an infatuation with Balder.
- Hel is the goddess of the dead and the underworld. She is unpopular amongst the other gods, who find her strange and unappealing, but she is actually very lonely and craves company.
- Idun keeps the apples which maintain the gods' youth and strength. She is usually hesitant to leave her apples ungaurded, but is also somewhat vain: when Jonas explains that he wants to take a picture of her outside (a ploy so he and Sofie can secretly hide the apples from Loki), she is quick to leave Sofie alone to watch the apples.
- Freya is Njord's daughter, and is very beautiful. She, along with Odin, is one of the wiser gods in Asgard. While the rest of the gods tend to be portrayed as oblivious, she at least seems to more aware.
- Tyr is somewhat gruff, but kind to Jonas and Sofie. He enjoys Thor's company (when Thor is not throwing a tantrum). He only has one hand, because he lost the other to the Fenris wolf.
- Sif is Thor's wife, and has very long hair. Her character is not developed much beyond helping Thor out with various tasks, and being his loyal companion.

=== Other ===
- Thrym is a gruff and duplicitous giant that lives in Utgard, a fortress within Jotunheim (Land of the Giants). Although he initially works with Loki, he has no affection for him, and craves only power.
- Snifer appears to be Ragnhild's dog, but is actually the Fenris wolf. He is destined to eat Odin at Ragnarok.

== Episodes ==
There are 24 episodes to corresponding to days from 1 to 24 December:

- 1. Rejsen til mormor ("The Journey to Grandmother")
- 2. Manden i hulen ("The Man in the Cave")
- 3. Sofies hemmelighed ("Sofie's Secret")
- 4. Runemagi til Jonas ("Rune Magic for Jonas")
- 5. Pagten med Loke ("The Pact with loki")
- 6. Den hemmelige tunnel ("The Secret Tunnel")
- 7. Valhal ("Valhalla")
- 8. Lokes forbrydelse ("Loki's Crime")
- 9. TV-reparatøren ("The TV-Repairman")
- 10. Loke på æblerov ("Loki Preys on Apples")
- 11. Odins runer ("Odin's Runes")
- 12. Turen til Hel ("The Trip to Hel")
- 13. Balders lys ("Balder's Light")
- 14. Thors brudefærd ("Thor's Wedding")
- 15. Rejsen til Udgård ("The Journey to Utgard")
- 16. Fest hos Thrym ("Party with Thrym")
- 17. Flugten fra Thrym ("The Escape from Thrym")
- 18. Fenrisulven ("The Fenris Wolf")
- 19. Pas på Ulven ("Be Careful with the Wolf")
- 20. Sandhedens time ("The Moment of Truth")
- 21. Mod fjender uden nåde ("Against Merciless Enemies")
- 22. Et stort hjerte ("A Big Heart")
- 23. Ragnarok ("Ragnarok")
- 24. Jul i Midgård ("Yule in Midgard")

== Running gags ==
The series has many running gags that it employs, including:

- Loki's disguises:
Loki often disguises himself (very poorly) as a human of a distinct career in order to enter Ragnhild's house. His disguises include: a television repairman, a delivery boy (who also does plumbing), and a cabby. Another source of humour is that Tove is always the one who encounters Loki in his disguises, and she is never suspicious of his strange behaviour or bad costumes. For example: when Loki disguised himself as a delivery boy so he could get the Fenris wolf, Fenris was not there at the time, so he simply stood in the kitchen staring at Tove until she mentioned that the faucet was broken. Loki then claimed that he was also there for that, saying he has two jobs. Instead of thinking that Loki was acting suspicious, Tove thought it was wonderfully convenient. Additionally, Tove never seems to recognize him, even though his disguises are rarely ever more than a hat or a suit.
- Loki in the modern world:
Loki encounters several modern developments, and his favourites seem to be processed foods. The humour of many scenes comes from such circumstances as: Loki finds Jonas' cola in the dolmen, is initially shocked by the release of carbonation when he opens the lid, then tentatively tastes it and, deciding that he likes it, quaffs the entire bottle; Loki tries to give off the appearance of fixing a television set by merely holding up the power cord and looking at it; Loki tries to give off the appearance of fixing a sink by looking at the pipes and randomly banging around; and Loki eats out of a jar of nutella (or perhaps peanut butter) using only his fingers while Jonas and Sofie are trying to explain their plan for stopping Ragnarok to him.
- The wood basket:
When Tove first meets Asbjørn, he puts a basket of chopped wood down by her work station. Tove, unhappy with this location, moves it to the hearth in front of the fireplace as soon as Asbjørn is out of the room. It then becomes a running gag to have one or the other notice that the wood basket is not where they want it to be, and move it (either to Tove's workstation or to the hearth). One time, Tove was wandering around while brushing her teeth, and caught Asbjørn in the act of moving the basket to her work station, because he thought she was in bed. After they fall in love, however, Asbjørn concedes that Tove's place for it by the hearth makes more sense, and he puts it there.
- Emma interrupting:
When Tove and Asbjørn begin to act amorous towards each other, Emma will usually walk in and ask about something (often quite non sequitur), prompting Tove and Asbjørn to immediately stop being affectionate and try to act casual, even though they come off as being nervous instead.
- Mr. Tong interrupting:
Mr. Tong (Tove's boss) is constantly calling Tove, presumably because she is important to the company and he needs to discuss business-related topics with her. He also has a tendency to call whenever Tove is discussing something important with somebody else (like Sofie), or when Tove is acting affectionate towards Asbjørn (and vice versa).
- Emma finding Jonas' things
Jonas has a tendency to bring back magical "souvenirs" from his travels to the other worlds, including one of Idun's apples and Thor's hammer, Mjolnir. After he gets home, he usually hides his new souvenir in an odd place, like in the couch or cupboard, where Emma promptly finds it and (unaware of its magical properties) uses it in some comical way. Sofie then either scolds Jonas or makes him return it.
- Emma feeding Snifer a pebernød every day:
This actually marks each day of the calendar as Christmas Eve approaches. In the first episode Emma counts out enough pebernødder (small Danish Christmas cookies) into a tin to last until Christmas Eve. Each episode features Emma feeding the household pet dog Snifer one of them, often in some creative way.

== Cast ==
- Sofie - Laura Buhl
- Jonas - Lukas Thorsteinsson
- Tove - Ann Eleonora Jørgensen
- Asbjørn - Troels Lyby
- Emma - Clara Bahamondes
- Ragnhild - Vigga Bro
- Snifer - Louis (a dog)
- Loke - Martin Brygmann
- Odin - Søren Spanning
- Heimdal - Peter Frödin
- Thor - Henrik Noél Olesen
- Balder - Cyron Melville
- Hel - Lotte Andersen
- Ydun - Lene Maria Christensen
- Freja - Helle Fagralid
- Tyr - Bjørn Fjæstad
- Njord - Morten Eisner
- Sif - Bodil Jørgensen
- Thrym - Morten Suurballe

== Sequel ==
Following the success of the miniseries, a feature film was made as a sequel, called Guldhornene ("The Golden Horns"). A teaser trailer for the film was made available on the Jul i Valhal DVD collection. This film was released 12 October 2007. The film is about Loki, Thor, Heimdall, and Idun in Midgard, trying to prevent two golden horns from falling into the wrong hands and causing the extinction of humans. Since the gods do not know how to operate in the modern world full of technology, they employ the help of Sofie, Jonas, and Emma.

== Sources and external links ==
- Jul i Valhal on IMDB
- TV 2's Jul i Valhal site
- Guldhornene on IMDB
- Guldhornene on Cosmo Film, with teaser trailer
