= Karen-Lise Mynster =

Danish actress (born 1952)

Karen-Lise Mynster (born 15 January 1952, Aalborg) is a Danish actress who gained popularity in 1978 while performing the role of Eliza in My Fair Lady at Copenhagen's Det Danske Teater. She is however remembered above all for her role as Ulla Jacobsen in the popular Danish television series Matador. In the 1980s, she appeared in leading roles in many stage productions at the Royal Danish Theatre while in the 1990s she performed mainly in films, In 2015, Mynster was honoured with her fifth Reumert Award as best actress of the year.

== Early life, education and family ==
Born in Aalborg on 7 May 1952, Karen-Lise Mynster is the daughter of the publicity manager Georg Thorkil Mynster and his wife Elinor Maggi Cecilie née Didriksen, a hairdresser. After matriculating from Birkerød School, she studied drama at Statens Teaterskole (1972–75). She was married to the actor Søren Spanning (1951–2020) with whom she had two children, Jasper (1987) and Rosalina (1990) who also became a successful actress.

== Career ==
On graduating, Mynster spent two years at Aalborg Teater. She first gained attention in 1978 as Eliza in the musical My Fair Lady at Det Danske Teater in Copenhagen. She performed frequently at the Royal Danish Theatre in the 1980s, taking leading roles in productions including Trafford Tanzi, Mutter Courage and Guys and Dolls. She went on to perform in several other Copenhagen theatres, in particular taking the title roles in Ibsen's Hedda Gabler (1994) and Maria Stuart (1998) at Folketeatret. More recently, Mynster has returned to the stage of the Royal Danish theatre taking leading roles in Ødipus og Antigone (2016), Odysseen (2022) and Molière's Dom Juan (2023).

Her most successful television roles have been Ulla Jakobsen in Danmarks Radio's production of Matador (1978–81) and Ella Heiberg in their Kald mig Liva (1992).

== Awards ==
Karen-Lise Mynster has received many notable awards including Henkelprisen (1984), Teaterpokalen (1995), the Reumart Cabaret Show award (2000), the Reumert Award of Honour (2004) and the Reumert Best Actress Award on three occasions (2003, 2007 and 2015),. She also won the Lauritzen Award in 2015 and the Wilhelm Hansen Prize in 2016.
