= Max Embarrassing 2 =

2011 film

- Directed by: Lotte Svendsen
- Written by: Tommy Bredsted; Mette Agnete Horn; Lotte Svendsen
- Starring: Samuel Heller-Seiffert; Anders Hove; Lars Bom; Louise Mieritz
- Cinematography: Lars Skree
- Release date: 7 April 2011
- Running time: 95 minutes
- Country: Denmark
- Language: Danish

Max Embarrassing 2 (Danish: Max Pinlig 2 - sidste skrig) is a 2011 Danish comedy film directed by Lotte Svendsen. It is a sequel to the 2008 film Max Embarrassing.

== Cast ==
- Samuel Heller-Seiffert as Max (as Samuel Heller)
- Mette Agnete Horn as Mor (as Mette Horn)
- Lars Bom as Steen Cold
- Michelle Bjørn-Andersen as Marianne
- Anders Hove as Mogens
- Henrik Lykkegaard as Clavs
- Faysal Mobahriz as Hassan
- Anna Agafia Svideniouk Egholm as Esther
- Luca d'Apuzzo Poulsen as Oliver
- Louise Mieritz as Ulla
