= Rosalinde Mynster =

Danish actor (born 1990)

- Born: Rosalinde Spanning; 28 September 1990 (age 35); Frederiksberg, Denmark
- Education: University of Southern Denmark
- Occupation: actress
- Years active: 1998–present
- Partner: Jakob Emil Lamdahl Pedersen
- Parent(s): Søren Spanning; Karen-Lise Mynster
- Relatives: Jasper Spanning (brother)

Rosalinde Mynster (pronounced [ˈmønˀstɐ]; born 28 September 1990) is a Danish actress best known for her 33-episode role as Fie Kjær, a chambermaid and hotel owner and manager in Badehotellet (subtitled in English as Seaside Hotel).

== Education ==
She graduated in 2009 from Sankt Annæ Gymnasium, a secondary school that emphasizes singing and acting, and which annually stages a musical in its large concert hall. Having studied literature at the University of Southern Denmark, Mynster told a reporter for Jydske Vestkysten, allowed her to "dive into the universe of books" and to do some inward-looking writing herself: “I would like to write absurd but self-deprecating generational portraits for those my own age. We must be able to laugh at ourselves and at the bizarre in portraying ourselves through social media, because as a generation we are very confused, precisely because we were brought up to believe that the whole world is only about us.”

Bemoaning a tendency in young people to spend too much time in front of video screens, she told the interviewer: “We sometimes forget to think for ourselves. Both books and theatre offer opportunities to develop and test our imagination on a higher level, because we ourselves have to arrive at some details and to form mental images. It's insanely important for people to develop that ability and to be able to connect the dots.”

== Childhood ==
Mynster told the Jydske Vestkysten interviewer that her acclaimed actor parents neither encouraged nor discouraged her acting career, saying: “Of gravest significance for them was that I go in with eyes open and that I make my own choices.”

Her mother, Karen-Lise Mynster, has had numerous film and TV roles over a 40-year career; her father, Søren Spanning (1951–2020), also appeared in at least ten motion pictures; her elder brother Jasper Spanning is a cinematographer; and her sister Line Spanning operates a pilates studio in Copenhagen.

Having grown up in a theatrical setting, spending much time backstage, amid backdrops, props and sumptuous costumes, which served as "a playground, a pure, utopian dreamland to explore," Rosalinde Mynster said she would sometimes put makeup on wig mannequins whilst her parents were on stage. Admitting that at first she was somewhat averse to theatre, she said: “When one has grown up with [theatricality], it can easily feel embarrassing because it has such large arm movements. It has been a journey for me to get all the way to where I have begun to embrace the theatrical. In the end, the theater became my playground, where I have been able to try things out."

== Film and TV roles ==
Mynster made her film debut starring as a 16-year-old in Niels Arden Oplev's 2008 drama To Verdener (English title: Worlds Apart), based on a true story about a teenage Jehovah's Witness who breaks free from her repressive family, facing "disfellowshipping" over her romance with a non-witness boy. In 2009, that film became the Danish Oscar entry in the "Best International Feature Film" category, but was not one of the five short-listed nominees.

In 2010, she starred opposite Thure Lindhardt in the comedy Sandheden om mænd (English title: Truth About Men), and in 2012 she had a smaller role in En kongelig affære (English title: A Royal Affair).

Her popular breakthrough came with the principal role as Fie in Danish digital broadcaster TV 2's drama series Badehotellet in 2013 – a role she chose to leave after five seasons. In subsequent seasons of the story arc, Fie's absence is accounted for by her having supposedly moved to England and having had children.

In 2022 she starred as Anna in the film Kisset (English title: The Kiss), directed by Bille August.

== Activism ==
Mynster has told journalist Birgitte Bartholdy that she became a vegetarian at the beginning of 2015; she lived for a few years in a vegetarian collective in Østerbro, Copenhagen with three others – where, she said, they would regularly prepare an Indian dahl stew of lentils or split peas, or make a salad from kale, quinoa, feta cheese, red cabbage and avocado. When possible for her, she also practices pilates exercises two or three times a week at her sister's pilates studio.

She has ongoing concerns over the treatment of refugees: “It is not only important that I be redeemed through the theatre and film work I do; I want to do something beyond myself, to mean something to someone and to be political. It makes me unhappy that we treat refugees so badly and are no longer understanding of the terrible situation they are in.” In the spring of 2016, she organized an event where 34 asylum restrictions were portrayed in 34 works of art created over a 34-hour period.
