= Sunstroke at the Beach Resort =

1973 film

- Directed by: Klaus Pagh
- Written by: Mogens Dam; Preben Kaas; Aage Stentoft
- Produced by: Klaus Pagh
- Starring: Daimi
- Release date: 24 August 1973
- Running time: 81 minutes
- Country: Denmark
- Language: Danish

Sunstroke at the Beach Resort (Danish: Solstik på badehotellet) is a 1973 Danish comedy film directed by Klaus Pagh and starring Daimi and Dirch Passer.

== Cast ==
- Daimi as Vibeke / Viggo
- Lisbet Lundquist as Mona Miller
- Lise-Lotte Norup as Eva Linde
- Klaus Pagh as Teodor / Teddy Winther
- Dirch Passer as Dr. Grå
- Ulf Pilgaard as Portieren
