= Word of God (film) =

2017 film

- Film poster
- Directed by: Henrik Ruben Genz
- Written by: Henrik Ruben Genz
- Starring: Søren Malling
- Release date: 21 September 2017
- Country: Denmark
- Language: Danish

Word of God (Danish: Gud taler ud) is a 2017 Danish drama film directed by Henrik Ruben Genz. It was shortlisted as one of the three films to be selected as the potential Danish submission for the Academy Award for Best Foreign Language Film at the 90th Academy Awards. However, You Disappear was selected as the Danish entry.

== Cast ==
- Søren Malling as God / Uffe
- Marie Askehave as Epidemilæge
- Maria Erwolter as Josefine
- Mads Riisom as Hansi
