= Accused (2005 film) =

- Film poster
- Danish: Anklaget
- Directed by: Jacob Thuesen
- Written by: Kim Fupz Aakeson
- Produced by: Thomas Heinesen; Kim Magnusson
- Starring: Troels Lyby; Sofie Gråbøl; Paw Henriksen; Louise Mieritz
- Cinematography: Sebastian Blenkov
- Edited by: Per K. Kirkegaard
- Music by: Nikolaj Egelund
- Release date: 28 January 2005
- Country: Denmark
- Language: Danish

Accused (Danish: Anklaget) is a 2005 Danish drama film, directed by Jacob Thuesen. It is about a couple, Henrik and Nina Christofferson whose happiness was shattered when their 14-year-old daughter Stine accused her father of molesting her. The film showed at the 55th Berlin International Film Festival in February 2005.

== Plot ==
Henrik and Nina Christofferson seem to be an ordinary family living happily. However, their difficult 14-year-old daughter, Stine, has a habit of telling lies in class. When Stine accuses her father of sexual abuse, and is readily believed by social workers, the family is thrown into crisis. Did Henrik do it? When Stine prepares to return home, the ugly side of family life is exposed.

== Cast ==
- Troels Lyby - Henrik
- Sofie Gråbøl - Nina
- Paw Henriksen - Pede
- Louise Mieritz - Pernille
- Kirstine Rosenkrands Mikkelsen - Stine
- Søren Malling - Forsvarer (solicitor)
