= Deviation (1971 film) =

- Film Poster
- Directed by: José Ramón Larraz (as J.R. Larrath)
- Screenplay by: José Ramón Larraz
- Story by: Sture Sjöstedt
- Produced by: Remo Odovaine; José Ramón Larraz
- Starring: Karl Lanchbury; Sibyla Grey; Lisbet Lundquist; Malcolm Terris
- Cinematography: Arthur Lavis
- Edited by: Carlo Reali
- Music by: Stelvio Cipriani
- Production company: Saga Film A.B. Stockholm
- Release date: 18 December 1971
- Running time: 89 minutes
- Country: Sweden
- Language: English

Deviation is a 1971 Swedish exploitation thriller film written and directed by José Ramón Larraz and starring Karl Lanchbury, Lisbet Lundquist, Malcolm Terris and Sibyla Grey. The plot follows a young couple in the English countryside who, after a car accident, are taken in by a mysterious taxidermist and his sister at their country house.

== Plot ==
The film opens with Rebecca running frantically through a forest, intercut with Julian nailing planks of wood across a doorframe. The two are brother and sister and they live together in a country house. Julian is a taxidermist who has expressed an interest in human embalming.

One night, Paul and his girlfriend Olivia are driving down a country road. When a ghostly white figure runs out in front of them, Paul swerves the car, causing them to crash. Paul suffers a head injury as a result. Julian and Rebecca, who were driving by, offer to take the couple back to their house. They are given a place to stay in a spare bedroom. Paul immediately becomes suspicious of Julian and Rebecca's motives, believing that they are trying to hide something. They are both given what Rebecca claims to be sleeping pills but it transpires that they have been drugged. However, Paul had already taken an upper. In the middle of the night, he is woken by screaming coming from somewhere in the house. He investigates around the house where he finds a gibbering old woman and later notices a group of people carrying the body of the white figure that Paul had hit with his car. He tries to escape the house but is caught by Julian and Rebecca's gang who then force Paul to have sex at gunpoint with a woman in the gang. Rebecca becomes bothered by it and brutally stabs Paul to death.

The next morning, Olivia wakes up alone and is told that Paul has gone back to London. She is introduced to Auntie, who is a medium. Paul had come across her the previous night. Olivia is advised by Auntie to leave the house while she still can or she will be killed. However, Olivia is led by Rebecca into endless drugs and orgies.

After being repeatedly injected with drugs against her will, an unconscious Olivia is examined by an elderly chemist, who Julian and Rebecca get their drugs from. He warns them that one of these days, they're going to go too far. The chemist brings Rebecca to his pharmacy where he claims to have medicine for Olivia. He later seduces Rebecca who ends up murdering him. Back at the house, Julian begins embalming Paul's corpse.

When Olivia wakes up, she finds Rebecca lying dead next to her. Olivia then goes to Auntie's room where she tries to find a gun that she had been shown earlier. Instead, she discovers a piece of Paul's skin that she is able to identify because of a tattoo. When Julian hears Olivia's screams and finds her in Auntie's room, Olivia shoots him to death with the gun.

The film closes with Olivia, who has ended up in hospital, in a coma. When she wakes up, she sees a nurse and doctor observing her but she imagines them to be Julian and Rebecca.

== Cast ==
- Karl Lanchbury as Julian
- Lisbet Lundquist as Olivia
- Sibyla Grey as Rebecca
- Malcolm Terris as Paul
- Shelagh Wilcocks as Auntie
- Geoffrey Wincott as Chemist
- Frederick Schrecker as Mr. Malcolm

== Production ==
Although it was a Swedish production, the film was shot on location in England.

== Soundtrack ==
In April 2016, Dagored Records issued a limited vinyl release of the film's original musical score by Stelvio Cipriani, made available for Record Store Day.

== Home media ==
The Canadian home video distributor Marquis issued a VHS edition of the film. The cover art features a still of actress Jo-Ann Robinson taken from the 1983 horror film Scalps.
