= Violet blue =

Violet blue may refer to:

- Violet blue, a color that is a tone of Indigo
  - Majorelle Blue, a deep blue color
  - RAL 5000 Violet blue, a RAL color
- Violet Blue, author and sex educator
- Noname Jane, pornographic film actress previously known as Violet Blue
- Violet Blue (album), a 1993 album by Japanese singer-songwriter Chara
- "Violet Blue", a song from Jill Jones (album) by Jill Jones
- Lepidochrysops violetta, a butterfly found in Zimbabwe
- "Violet Blue", a song by English singer Kyla La Grange

== See also ==
- Violets Are Blue (disambiguation)
- Violent Blue, a 2011 film
- The Violent Blue, a 2008 album by Electric President
