= Stealing Rembrandt =

- Directed by: Jannik Johansen
- Written by: Jannik Johansen; Anders Thomas Jensen
- Produced by: Thomas Gammeltoft
- Starring: Jakob Cedergren; Lars Brygmann; Nicolas Bro
- Cinematography: Eric Kress
- Edited by: Per K. Kirkegaard
- Music by: Anthony Genn
- Production company: Fine & Mellow Productions
- Distributed by: Nordisk Film; Biografdistributionen
- Release date: 5 September 2003
- Running time: 104 minutes
- Country: Denmark
- Language: Danish

Stealing Rembrandt (original title Rembrandt) is a 2003 Danish-language action comedy film. An action comedy, A Danish/UK co-production, the film was directed by Jannik Johansen and written by Anders Thomas Jensen and Jannik Johansen.

The film was premiered at the 2003 Cannes Film Festival.

== Plot ==
The film concerns a father and son who accidentally steal a painting by Rembrandt.

== Relation to real events ==
On 29 January 1999, Rembrandt's "portrait of a lady" (as well as another painting by Bellini) was stolen from the poorly protected Nivaagaard Samlingen in Nivå in Denmark. The depiction in the film of the level of security at that time is fairly accurate, as well as the involvement of bounty hunters as civilian agents in the case. Also, the persons involved were related as depicted, although the role of the father (Mick in the movie) was actually the uncle (of Tom in the movie).

== Cast ==
- Lars Brygmann - Mick
- Jakob Cedergren - Tom
- Nikolaj Coster-Waldau - Kenneth (as Nikolaj Coster Waldau)
- Nicolas Bro - Jimmy
- Sonja Richter - Trine
- Søren Pilmark - Bæk
- Gordon Kennedy - Christian
- Paprika Steen - Charlotte
- Ulf Pilgaard - Flemming
- Thomas W. Gabrielsson - Erik
- Ole Ernst - Frank
- Nikolaj Lie Kaas - Kiosk Karsten
- Patrick O'Kane - Nigel
- Martin Wenner - Toby
- Søren Poppel - Allan Rocker

== See also ==
- Cinema of Denmark
