= Me and the Mafia =

1973 film

- Directed by: Henning Ørnbak
- Written by: Lise Nørgaard
- Produced by: Erik Overbye; Gerd Overbye
- Starring: Dirch Passer
- Cinematography: Claus Loof
- Edited by: Maj Soya
- Production company: Saga Studios
- Release date: 14 December 1973
- Running time: 97 minutes
- Country: Denmark
- Language: Danish

Me and the Mafia (Danish: Mig og Mafiaen) is a 1973 Danish comedy film directed by Henning Ørnbak and starring Dirch Passer and Klaus Pagh.

== Plot ==
The film follows the con man Victor Hansen, who has made a fortune together with his partner Rikard. Rikard has deposited the money in a Swiss bank account, and has had the account number tattooed on the buttocks of four mistresses; he is then killed by a mafia gang. Victor tries to find the girls to get access to the stashed millions in the account, but is thwarted by the mafia. In the end he is allowed to keep his life, but has to sell pieces of Venice to rich tourists on the mafia's behalf.

== Cast ==
- Dirch Passer - Victor 'Viffer' Hansen
- Klaus Pagh - Rikard Abelsteen
- Tove Maës - Lily
- Poul Bundgaard - Vittorio Ferucci
- Susanne Heinrich - Marcellina
- Jørgen Kiil - Arnold von Cleef
- Vera Gebuhr - Krøll Knudsen
- Anette Karlsen - Merete
- Lisbet Lundquist - Majbritt
- Jane Thomsen - Janne Petersen
- Ove Verner Hansen - Klumpen / Møller
- Edward Fleming - Arthur
- Ole Ishøy - Klumpen's assistant
- Freddy Albeck - Don Luigi
- Otto Brandenburg - Dino
- Per Goldschmidt - Carlo
- Poul Glargaard - Capo
- Karl Stegger - Andersen, prison guard
- Ole Monty - Undertaker
- Gotha Andersen - Milkman
- Lulu Ziegler - A Danish-American woman
- Harald Jørgensen - Her husband
- Hannah Bjarnhof - Sergent Bentsen
- Preben Ravn - Thug
- Marianne Wesén - Mother of a child being baptised
- Carl-Hugo Calander - Museum inspector Söderstrand
- Ellen Margrethe Stein - Dog-loving judge
- Elisabeth Nørager - Soldier Frederiksen
- Simon Rosenbaum - Tinsmith
- Ebba Amfeldt - Cleaning lady at a Swedish museum
- Hardy Rafn - Man by photo booth
- Henning Ørnbak - Swiss banker
