= Violets Are Blue =

Violets Are Blue may refer to:

- "Violets are blue", a phrase from the traditional rhyme "Roses Are Red"
- Violets Are Blue (1975 film), a 1975 Danish film
- Violets Are Blue (1986 film), a 1986 romance starring Sissy Spacek
- Violets Are Blue (novel), a 2001 novel in the Alex Cross series by James Patterson
- "Violets Are Blue", a 2002 song by The Killing Tree
- "Violets Are Blue", a 2010 extended play by Breezy Lovejoy, a former pseudonym of Anderson Paak

== See also ==
- Violet blue (disambiguation)
