= Ulf Pilgaard =

Danish actor (1940–2024)

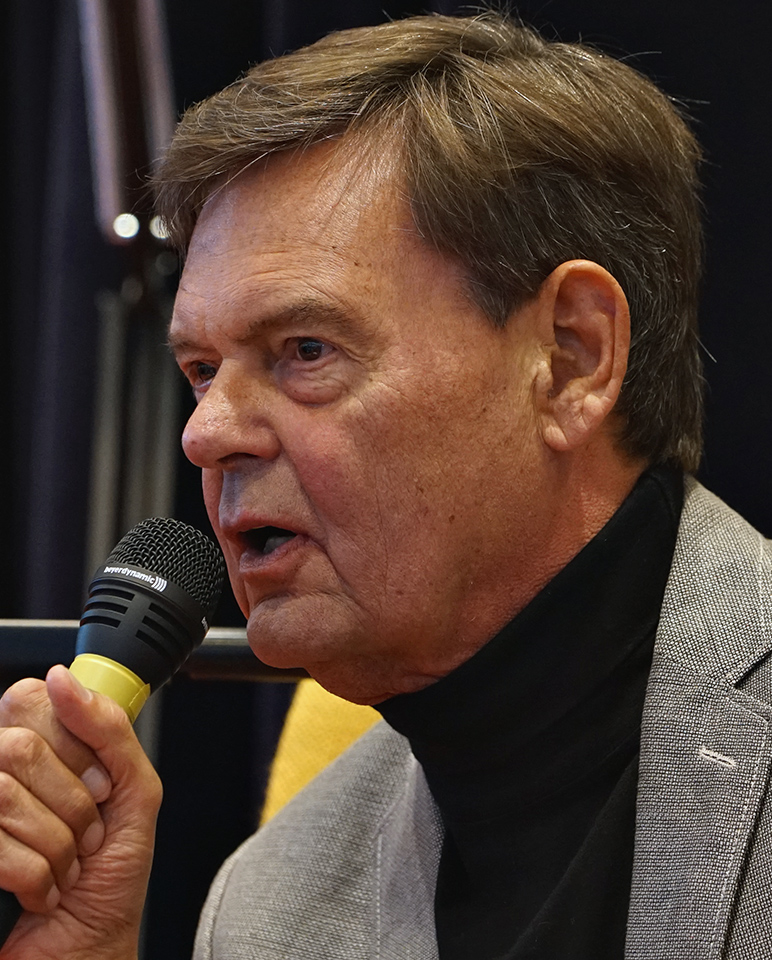
- Pilgaard in 2015
- Born: 15 November 1940; Skive, Denmark
- Died: 28 October 2024 (aged 83)
- Occupation: Actor
- Years active: 1968–2024
- Height: 1.96 m (6 ft 5 in)

Ulf Pilgaard (15 November 1940 – 28 October 2024) was a Danish actor.

== Life and career ==
Pilgaard was born in Skive, Denmark on 15 November 1940. The son of a priest, he initially studied theology before transitioning to a career in acting.

Pilgaard was a prominent figure in Cirkusrevyen, where he performed for 28 years. He appeared in several films, including Nightwatch and Farligt venskab.

For his role in Farligt venskab, he won both the Bodil Award and Robert Award for Best Leading Actor.

Pilgaard was married. He died from a cardiac arrest on 28 October 2024, at the age of 83.

== Selected filmography ==
Year	Film	Role	Notes
2006	Tempelriddernes skat		
2004	Kongekabale		
2003	Stealing Rembrandt		
2003	Arven		
2002	Open Hearts		
1995	Farligt venskab		
1994	Nightwatch		
1987	Kampen om den røde ko		
1985	Walter og Carlo – op på fars hat		
1978	Fængslende feriedage		
1977	Mind Your Back, Professor		
1976	Brand-Børge rykker ud		
1974	Nøddebo Præstegård		
1974	Me, Too, in the Mafia		
1974	19 Red Roses		
1973	Sunstroke at the Beach Resort		
1972	Lenin, You Rascal, You		
1970	Giv Gud en chance om søndagen		
1968	The Olsen Gang		
1968	Det er så synd for farmand		

== Sources ==
- Piil, M. (2008). Gyldendals danske filmguide (in Danish). Gyldendal. ISBN 978-87-02-06669-2.
