= Troels Lyby =

Danish actor (born 1966)

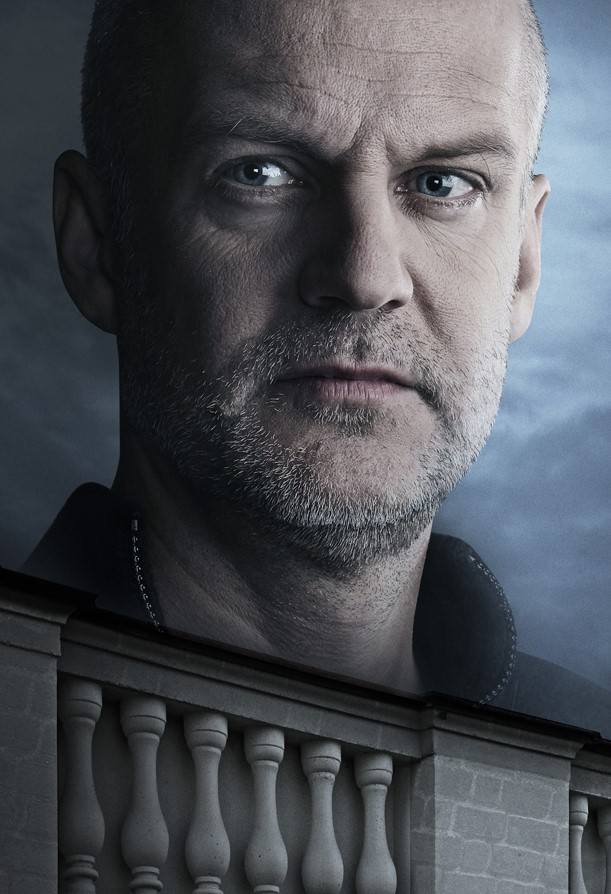
- Troels Lyby in Vrede (Fury), 2015
- Born: 15 October 1966 (age 59); Solbjerg, Denmark

Troels Lyby (born 15 October 1966) is a Danish actor. He made his big break in Hella Joof's film En kort en lang, but had previously acted in Let's Get Lost by Jonas Elmer and Lars von Trier's The Idiots. Since then, he has been in Okay and Jul i Valhal.

Troels Lyby was also in the Danish sitcom Hvor svært kan det være.

He has also played many roles in different theatres, including at the Gasolin' teaterkoncert.

Troels Lyby won the Robertprisen for best supporting actor in 2002 for the film En kort en lang and the Robertprisen for best actor in 2006 for the film Anklaget.

== Filmography (selected) ==
- 2016 – What We Become – Dino
- 2013 – Kvinden i buret (2013) – Hardy
- 2012 – Julestjerner – Big J
- 2011 – The Reunion
- 2009 – Headhunter
- 2008 – Disco Ormene – Jimmy (voice)
- 2008 – Blå mænd – Theodor
- 2008 – Sommer – Svend Andersen (TV 1 episode)
- 2007 – Forbrydelsen – Erik Salin (3 episodes)
- 2007 – Guldhornene – Asbjørn
- 2007 – Fremkaldt – Tobias
- 2007 – The Early Years: Erik Nietzsche Part 1 – Bent
- 2006 – Krøniken – Søren (4 episodes) (TV)
- 2006 – Der var engang en dreng – Obstetrician
- 2006 – Fidibus – Advokat
- 2006 – Under bæltestedet
- 2005 – Jul i Valhal – Asbjørn (2 episodes) (TV)
- 2005 – Anklaget – Henrik
- 2004 – Twelfth Night (holiday) – Tobias Hikke (TV)
- 2003 – 2004 Forsvar – Claus 'CC' Christensen (3 episodes) (TV)
- 2004 – Tæl til 100 – Lars
- 2003 – Annas dag – Ole
- 2002 – Hvor svært kan det være – Henrik (1 episode) (TV)
- 2002 – Okay – Kristian
- 2001 – En kort en lang – Jørgen
- 2001 – Den serbiske dansker – Per Toftlund (TV)
- 2001 – Mistænkt (VG) – Brian Tulberg
- 2000 – Före stormen – Læreren
- 2000 – Find dig selv (TV) – Per
- 2000 – Edderkoppen (TV miniseries) – Walter
- 1998 – Strisser på Samsø – Christian Hammer (1 episode) (TV)
- 1998 – Skæbneloddet – Christian Hammer (TV episode)
- 1998 – The Idiots (Danish title: "Idioterne") – Henrik
- 1997 – Let's Get Lost – Thomas
- 1995 – Debut
- 1995 – Who's Hitler? – Mann i boksershorts (TV)
- 1994 – Riget (TV miniseries) – Hook
