= Murk (film) =

- Murk Teaser Poster
- Directed by: Jannik Johansen
- Written by: Anders Thomas Jensen; Jannik Johansen
- Produced by: Thomas Gammeltoft; Hanne Palmquist; Ole Bendixen; Mike Downey; Sam Taylor; Zorana Piggott; Søren Poulsen
- Starring: Nikolaj Lie Kaas; Nicolas Bro
- Cinematography: Rasmus Videbæk
- Edited by: Per K. Kirkegaard
- Music by: Antony Genn
- Production companies: Film and Music Entertainment; Fine & Mellow Productions
- Distributed by: Nordisk Film Biografdistribution
- Release date: 19 August 2005
- Running time: 124 minutes
- Countries: Denmark; United Kingdom
- Language: Danish
- Budget: 22,000,000 DKK

Murk (Danish: Mørke) / (English: Darkness) is a 2005 Danish horror and psychological thriller film. The film was directed by Jannik Johansen, who wrote the screenplay along with Anders Thomas Jensen. The film stars Nikolaj Lie Kaas and Nicolas Bro.

== Plot ==
Julie, a wheelchair-user, is said to have committed suicide on her wedding night. Her brother Jacob, who is a journalist, follows her ex-fiance to the Danish village of Mørke. Upon meeting him, Jacob discovers that he is going to marry another handicapped woman. Upon these revelations, Jacob investigates whether Julie's ex-fiance is murdering women who are handicapped.

== Cast ==
- Nikolaj Lie Kaas as Jacob
- Nicolas Bro as Anker
- Lærke Winther Andersen as Hanne
- Laura Drasbæk as Nina
- Lotte Bergstrøm as Julie
- Anne Sophie Byder as Sonja
- Morten Lützhøft as Carl
- Lisbet Lundquist as Caroline
- Hother Bøndorff as Rikkes far
- Katrine Hartmann Nielsen as Rikke Bjerre
- Lars Lunøe as Ka Hjort
- Jørgen Lysemose as Bryllupspianist
- Søren Thomsen as Onkel Svend
- Ane Vinther as Rikkes mor

== Release ==
The film was screened at the Edinburgh International Film Festival on 19 August 2005 and on 23 August 2005 at the Copenhagen International Film Festival. The film was released in Denmark on 7 October 2005.

== Awards ==
Bodil Awards - 2006

- Nominated for Bodil award for Best Film (Bedste danske film)
- Nominated for Bodil for Best Supporting Actress (Bedste kvindelige birolle)

Robert Festival - 2006

- Nominated for a Robert award for Best Actor
- Nominated for a Robert award for Best Cinematography
- Nominated for a Robert award for Best Make-Up
- Nominated for a Robert award for Best Sound
- Nominated for a Robert award for Best Original Score

== Remake ==
Marcel Sarmiento and Gadi Harel directed the American adaptation of the film entitled Merciless. The Gold Circle Films project was rewritten in late December 2009 by Ed Dougherty and was released in 2011.
