= Shake It All About (film) =

2001 Danish comedy drama directed by Hella Joof

- DVD cover
- Directed by: Hella Joof
- Written by: Hella Joof; Klaus Bondam
- Produced by: Thomas Gammeltoft; Frank Hübner
- Starring: Mads Mikkelsen; Troels Lyby; Charlotte Munck
- Cinematography: Eric Kress
- Release date: 16 November 2001
- Running time: 98 minutes
- Country: Denmark
- Language: Danish

Shake It All About (Danish: En kort en lang, literally "A Short [One], a Long [One]") is a 2001 Danish comedy-drama directed by Hella Joof. It was entered into the 24th Moscow International Film Festival.

== Plot ==
The film is about gay couple Jørgen and Jacob, who live in a happy partnership. Jacob asks Jørgen to marry him, and he happily accepts. However, Jacob falls in love with the woman Caroline, who happens to be married to Tom, Jørgen's brother. Jacob is torn because he wants both Jørgen and Caroline. Jacob gets Caroline pregnant and wants to do the right thing by marrying her. Jacob can keep the secret from Jørgen for only so long.

== Cast ==
- Mads Mikkelsen as Jacob
- Troels Lyby as Jørgen
- Charlotte Munck as Caroline
- Jesper Lohmann as Tom
- Oskar Walsøe as Oskar
- Peter Frödin as Frederik
- Nikolaj Steen as Mads
- Ditte Gråbøl as Inge
- Morten Kirkskov as Adrian
- Henning Jensen as Palle
- Pernille Højmark as Ellen
- Ellen Hillingsø as Anne
- Ghita Nørby as Bine
- Thomas Winding as Hans Henrik
- Klaus Bondam as The priest

== Reception ==
The film has been noted for its narrative exploration of sexual fluidity.
