= Klaus Pagh =

Danish actor (1935–2020)

- Born: 29 July 1935; Hørsholm, Denmark
- Died: 8 December 2020 (aged 85)
- Occupations: Actor; Film producer Film director
- Years active: 1956 – 2001

Klaus Pagh (29 July 1935 – 8 December 2020) was a Danish actor, film producer and director. He appeared in more than 30 films between 1956 and 2001.

== Selected filmography ==
- Kira's Reason: A Love Story (2001)
- Girls at Arms 2 (1976)
- Me and the Mafia (1973)
- Sunstroke at the Beach Resort (1973, also directed)
- Amour (1970)
- Soldaterkammerater rykker ud (1959)
