= Lisbet Lundquist =

Danish actress

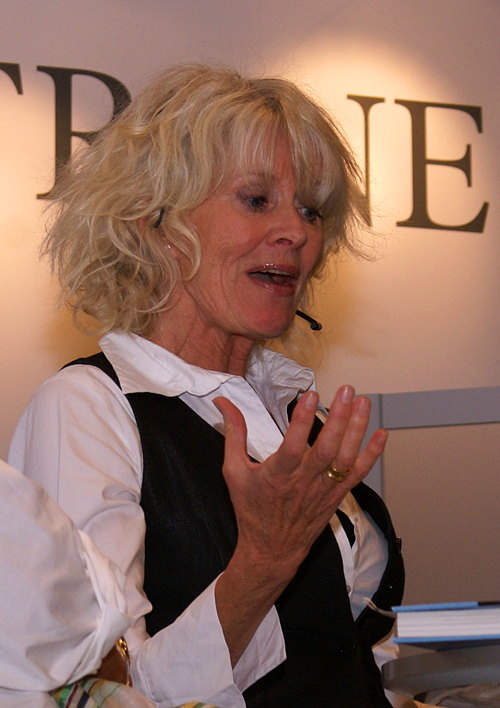
- Lundquist in 2008
- Born: 25 March 1943 (age 83); Hellerup, Denmark
- Occupation: Actress
- Years active: 1971–present

Lisbet Lundquist (born 25 March 1943) is a Danish film actress. She has appeared in more than thirty films since 1971.

== Selected filmography ==
Film
Year	Title	Role	Notes
2005	Murk		
1994	Frække Frida og de frygtløse spioner		
1977	Mind Your Back, Professor		
1973	Sunstroke at the Beach Resort		
1973	Me and the Mafia		
1972	Lenin, You Rascal, You		
1971	Deviation	Olivia	
1970	Ang.: Lone		
1970	Quiet Days in Clichy		

TV
Year	Title	Role	Notes
2012	Rita	Lillebeth Schmidt Kronborg	
2000–2002	Rejseholdet	Kirsten Jørgensen	
