= Hell Hole (2024 film) =

2024 film directed by John Adams and Toby Poser

- Promotional release poster
- Directed by: John Adams; Toby Poser
- Written by: John Adams; Lulu Adams; Toby Poser
- Produced by: Miljan Gogic; Matt Manjourides; Justin A. Martell
- Starring: Toby Poser; John Adams; Maximum Portman; Anders Hove
- Distributed by: Shudder
- Release date: July 29, 2024
- Running time: 92 minutes
- Countries: United States; Serbia
- Languages: English; Serbian; French; Slovenian

Hell Hole is a 2024 monster horror-thriller film directed by John Adams and Toby Poser. Its plot features a fracking team stationed in Serbia that encounters a strange and threatening creature.

== Cast ==
- Toby Poser as Emily
- John Adams as John
- Maximum Portman as Teddy
- Anders Hove as French Captain
- Marko Filipović as French Soldier
- Olivera Peruničić as Sofija
- Aleksandar Trmčić as Nikola
- Petar Arsić as Danko
- Bruno Veljanovski as Christian
- Boris Lukman as Filip
- Janko Radišić as Bosko
- Marko Vučković as Luka
- Joana Knežević as Mickey
- Ivan Đorđević as Ivan
- Fedor Đorović as Petar
- Marina Gunjača as Roma Woman

== Release ==
Hell Hole was released in Canada on July 29, 2024 as part of the 28th Fantasia International Film Festival. It was released in the United States on August 23, 2024.

== Reception ==
On the review aggregator website Rotten Tomatoes, 83% of 41 critics' reviews are positive. The website's consensus reads: "Hell Hole pokes much needed life into an aging genre, going back to basics and delivering the gory goods." Metacritic, which uses a weighted average, assigned the film a score of 62 out of 100, based on 10 critics, indicating "generally favorable" reviews.

Brian Tallerico of RogerEbert.com gave the film 2.5 stars out of 4, praising its gore and humor, but saying that it's "kind of a disappointment" compared to the other films of John Adams and Toby Poser. Matthew Jackson of Paste gave the film a mildly positive review, saying that it rides "a fascinating tonal line between black comedy and sincere character drama." Catherine Bray of The Guardian gave the film 3 stars out of 5, calling it "mostly satisfying" and "a committed piece of indie genre work with a suitably silly sense of the macabre."
