= Anders Hove (actor) =

Danish-Greenlandic actor and director

- Born: Greenland
- Occupations: Actor; director
- Years active: 1984–present
- Known for: Cesar Faison (General Hospital, Loving, Port Charles); Nalle (In the Middle of the Night)
- Height: 5 ft 9 in (1.75 m)
- Spouse: Ann Crosset (m. 1980)
- Children: 2, including Elliott Crosset Hove
- Parents: Anders Hove; Birthe Hove

Anders Hove is a Danish-Greenlandic actor and director. Hove is best known for his role of the vampire Radu Vladislas in the five Subspecies-movies, Cesar Faison in ABC's General Hospital, Loving, & Port Charles and in the film In the Middle of the Night as Nalle.

== Early life ==
In the 1970s, Hove attended the Det Kongelige Teater school in Denmark to learn formal acting. Before this, he had studied law and economics, and had planned on taking over his father's business.

== Career ==
Hove began his professional career in the 1980s, working mostly in Denmark before moving on to horror films in the United States. He soon found work on soap operas in the US and Canada. He has since carved out a place as a popular performer among Danish directors. His first real movie role was in the Danish movie In the Middle of the Night (1984), in which he played Nalle. After working in Denmark for a time as a stage and screen actor, Anders decided to try his luck on the American front. He and his wife sold their belongings and moved to the States. There he landed parts in shows like Tales From the Crypt and the sci-fi movie Critters 4 (direct to video) as 'Rick', the critter-infested ship's captain, and the role that many know and remember him for, as the fiendish and obsessive Cesar Faison on the ABC daytime soap opera General Hospital. Hove also had two crossovers with his character from General Hospital on Loving in 1993 and Port Charles in 2000. He also worked in a Canadian soap opera called Family Passions with General Hospital co-star and friend Kin Shriner (Scott Baldwin). Another former co-star on General Hospital, Michael Watson, suggested that Anders should play the villainous vampire Radu Vladislas in the Full Moon movie Subspecies (1991). He ended up being in three sequels to the movie during the 90s playing the long-fingered, drooling, infamous Radu. Hove returned to Denmark in the mid 90s and has continued to act there, being a favorite actor of the 'Dogme'-directors, usually playing bad guys.

In 1999, Hove returned to General Hospital. Hove made another return in 2012, and continued to make recurring appearances through 2014. Hove about his return in 2012 and beyond said in an interview with Michael Fairman said, "I don't know. At least this time around Faison won't be dead — though that's never stopped him before! They'll probably send him to jail but maybe there will be more down the line." On January 19, 2018, Soap Opera Digest announced Hove's return to General Hospital as Cesar Faison. Hove returned to the role in 2026 using his voice only.

== Personal life ==
In 1980, he married an American dancer and choreographer named Ann Thayer Crosset, and together they have two sons. Crosset is the first choreographer to hold a seat on the Danish Council of Arts. Elliott Crosset Hove has followed his dad into the acting business. Hove was asked by General Hospital to revive the character of Cesar Faison. He had planned on returning to the United States with his family. His wife acquired an important seat on the Danish Council of the Arts for a four-year term so Hove returned to Los Angeles and roomed with GH veteran Kin Shriner. Missing his family and unhappy about what was going with the character of Faison, Hove stayed for a little under a year before moving back to Denmark.

== Filmography ==
=== Film ===
Year	Title	Role	Notes
1984	In the Middle of the Night	Nalle	Drama film directed and co-written by Erik Balling; Also known as Midt om natten in Danish
1986	Flamberede hjerter	Finn	Comedy film directed by Helle Ryslinge
1986	The Wolf at the Door	Extra	Also known as Danish: Oviri and French: Gauguin, le loup dans le soleil; Danish-French biographical drama film written and directed by Henning Carlsen; Based on real life events of French artist Paul Gauguin.
1989	Notater om kærligheden	Naked Man	Directed by Jørgen Leth; Also known as Notes on Love
1990	Dagens Donna	Kræn Larsen	Drama–romantic film directed by Stefan Henszelman
1991	Critters 4	Captain Rick Buttram	Science fiction comedy horror film directed by Rupert Harvey
1991	Subspecies	Radu Vladislas	
1993	Bloodstone: Subspecies II	Radu Vladislas	
1994	Bloodlust: Subspecies III	Radu Vladislas	
1998	The Idiots	Josephine's Father	
1998	Subspecies 4: Bloodstorm	Radu Vladislas	
1999	Mifune	Gerner	Mifunes sidste sang (original title)
2004	Alt for Egil	Pizza-Paul	
2006	I, Vampire: Trilogy of Blood	Radu Vladislas	
2006	The Boss of It All	Jokumsen	Released as Direktøren for det hele in Danish.
2007	Temporary Release	Freddy	Entered into the 29th Moscow International Film Festival.; Danish film
2008	Terribly Happy	Købmand Moos	Won several Robert Awards
2009	Profetia	Tom	Danish film
2011	Max Embarrassing 2	Mogens	Danish: Max Pinlig 2 - sidste skrig
2011	Skyscraper	Buschauffør	Danish: Skyskraber; drama film directed by Rune Schjøtt
2013	Nymphomaniac: Vol. I	Odin	Cameo role
2017	Winter Brothers	The Long Haired Man	Also known as Danish: Vinterbrødre; Danish drama film directed by Hlynur Pálmason.
2023	Subspecies V: Blood Rise	Radu Vladislas	
2024	The Girl with the Needle	The Judge	
2024	Hell Hole	French Captain	

=== Television ===
Year	Title	Role	Notes
1984	Anthonsen	Vagthavende	Danish Miniseries
1990–present	General Hospital	Cesar Faison	Recurring role; 1990–92, 1999–2000, 2012–14, 2018, 2026
1991	Family Passions	Sebastian Langer	Recurring role
1991	Under Cover	Guest role	Episode: "Family Album" (S 1: Ep 5)
1993	Loving	Cesar Faison	Recurring role
1994	"The Return"	Hans Korbutt	Made-for-TV-Movie directed by James Frawley; Part of the Cagney & Lacey television film series
1996	Tales from the Crypt	Emilio	"Beauty Rest"
1997	The Kingdom II: Part 4 - Pandæmonium	Celebranten	Riget II (The Kingdom II) in Danish; Danish Miniseries
2000	Port Charles	Cesar Faison	Recurring role
2015	The Bridge	Fabian	2 episodes
2017	Seaside Hotel	Aage Svendsen	2 episodes
2020	Equinox	Laden	1 episode
2021	The Chestnut Man	Aksel	Recurring role

== See also ==
- List of Loving cast and characters
