= Jens Jørn Spottag =

Danish actor (born 1957)

- Born: 13 December 1957 (age 68); Odder, Denmark
- Occupation: Actor
- Years active: 1987-present

Jens Jørn Spottag (born 13 December 1957) is a Danish actor. He appeared in more than seventy films since 1987.

== Selected filmography ==
Film
Year	Title	Role	Notes
1998	Election Night		
2006	We Shall Overcome		
2008	Terribly Happy		
2008	Worlds Apart		
2011	ID A		
2012	This Life		
2014	Speed Walking		
2017	Ravens		

TV
Year	Title	Role	Notes
1998-1999	Taxa	Peter	
1999	Dybt vand		
2006	The Legacy	John Larsen	
2014	1864	Henrik Claude du Plat	
2022–2023	DNA	Christian Hoxa	
