= Lene Maria Christensen =

Danish actress

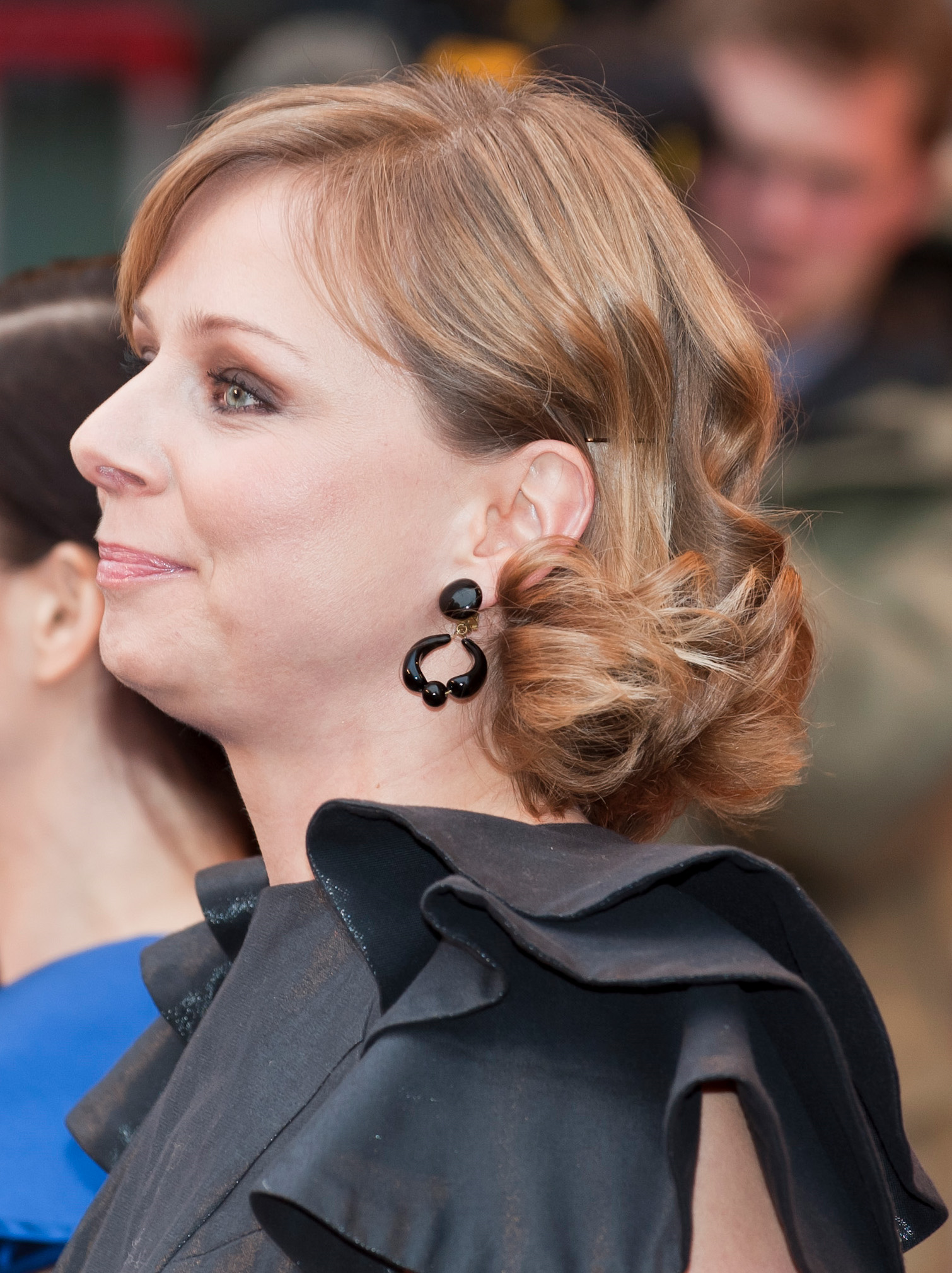
At the Berlin Film Festival, 2010

Lene Maria Christensen (born 10 April 1972) is a Danish actress. She is best known for her roles in both television and film, including the series Hotellet , Forsvar and Arvingerne.

Among her early TV roles came in Hotellet; she made her breakthrough at the stage in 2001 when she had the role of Constanze in Peter Shaffer's Amadeus. Among her early film roles were Se til venstre, der er en svensker (2003) and Brothers (2004).

For 2008 film Terribly Happy, Christensen won a Bodil Award for Best Actress in a Leading Role and a Robert Award for Best Actress in a Leading Role. She also received the Ove Sprogøe Award in 2008 and a Lauritzen Award in 2011.

For her role in The Legacy on television, she won a Robert Award for Best Actress in a Supporting Television Role. In 2023 she both won a Robert Award for Best Actress in a Supporting Role and a Bodil Award for Best Actress in a Supporting Role for Rose.

== Early and personal life ==
Lene Maria Christensen was born on 10 April 1972 in Hillerød, to the only daughter of her father, Jørgen Christensen, a Danish upholsterer, and her mother, Solveig Edel Christensen, a Danish cashier. She attended the Danish National School of Theatre from 1995 to 1999.

On 17 September 1995, Christensen married a Danish image processor Anders Bach Petersen (b. 10 April 1973). The couple have two daughters, Nanna and Viola. Her husband, Anders, was best known for his work in projects like Strisser på Samsø (1997-98).
