= Jannik Johansen =

Danish film director and screenwriter (born 1965)

- Born: 3 March 1965 (age 60); Denmark

Jannik Johansen (born 1965) is a Danish film director and screenwriter. He began film-making at Per Holst Film in the late 1980s, thereafter directed and edited television productions and short fiction. He wrote and directed a number of short fiction films, including fiction A Quiet Death, awarded by the National Art Fund. Johansen's feature film début and the box-office hit, Stealing Rembrandt (2003), was nominated on Bodil Awards and Robert Awards, and won Best Acting Ensemble for the male leads at Courmayeur Film Noir Festival in Italy. Later, Murk (2005) and White Night (2007) followed.
