= Worlds Apart (2008 film) =

- Film poster
- Danish: To verdener
- Directed by: Niels Arden Oplev
- Written by: Niels Arden Oplev; Steen Bille
- Produced by: Thomas Heinesen
- Starring: Rosalinde Mynster; Pilou Asbæk; Jens Jørn Spottag
- Cinematography: Lars Vestergaard
- Edited by: Anne Østerud
- Music by: Jakob Groth
- Distributed by: Nordisk Film
- Release dates: 11 February 2008 (Berlin International Film Festival); 22 February 2008
- Running time: 116 minutes
- Country: Denmark
- Language: Danish
- Box office: $4,361,860

Worlds Apart (Danish: To verdener) is a 2008 Danish drama film directed by Niels Arden Oplev and written by Oplev and Steen Bille. The film stars Rosalinde Mynster and Pilou Asbæk. Based upon a true story, the film is about a 17-year-old Jehovah's Witness girl who struggles to reconcile her faith and her secret romance with a non-believer boy. Worlds Apart played at the 2008 Berlin International Film Festival and was submitted by Denmark for the 2009 Academy Award for Best Foreign Language Film.

== Plot ==
Sara is a teenager who lives with her family, who are Jehovah's Witnesses. The family's devout image is questioned when the parents divorce as a consequence of the father's infidelity. One night at a party Sara meets Teis, an older boy who takes an interest in her. Teis is not a Witness, and their relationship is rejected by her father, but Sara falls in love and begins to doubt her faith. Facing ostracism from her faith and family, Sara must make the toughest choice of her young life.

== Cast ==
- Rosalinde Mynster as Sara
- Pilou Asbæk as Teis
- Jens Jørn Spottag as Andreas Dahl
- Sarah Boberg as Karen
- Anders W. Berthelsen as John
- Sarah Juel Werner as Elisabeth
- Jacob Ottensten as August
- Thomas Knuth-Winterfeldt as Jonas
- Charlotte Fich as Jette
- Hans Henrik Voetmann as Vagn
- Catrine Beck as Thea
- Hans Henrik Clemensen as Erik

== See also ==
- List of Danish submissions for the Academy Award for Best International Feature Film
