= Henrik Ruben Genz =

Danish film director (born 1959)

Henrik Ruben Genz (born 7 November 1959 in Gram, Denmark) is a Danish film director.

Before becoming involved with film, Genz attended Designskolen Kolding, where he studied graphic design, after giving up on an earlier dream of being a painter. While there, he did some work with video, and a chance meeting with director Arne Bro encouraged him to pursue film as a career. Genz was then accepted into the National Film School of Denmark at the age of 31, graduating after completing the well-regarded short film Cross Roads (Danish title: Omveje, Detours) in 1995.

Genz's next work, the short film Theis and Nico (Danish title: Bror, min bror, Brother, my brother), released in 1999, was nominated for an Academy Award for Best Live Action Short Film. He then became involved with the Dogme 95 movement, but was unable to produce any quality work after six months of effort. Speaking later about his difficulty in trying to work under the Dogme restrictions, he described himself as a "visual director" and Dogme as a movement where "the camera follows the [actors] and choice means nothing".

In 2003, Genz released his first feature film, an adaptation of the children's book Someone like Hodder (Danish title: En som Hodder) by popular writer Bjarne Reuter. He followed it in 2005 with Chinaman (Danish title: Kinamand), a romantic comedy about a man who takes a foreign wife in an arranged marriage so that she can obtain permission for residency, and then falls in love with her.

Genz returned to his roots in 2008, adapting (with Dunja Gry Jensen) a novel by fellow Gram native Erling Jepsen into the film Terribly Happy. In their youths, Genz and Jepsen had been childhood acquaintances who lived across the street from one another. It won numerous awards, including the Crystal Globe at the Karlovy Vary International Film Festival.

== Filmography ==
- Someone like Hodder (2003)
- Chinaman (2005)
- Terribly Happy (2008)
- Excuse Me (2012)
- Good People (2014)
- Satisfaction 1720 (2016)
- Word of God (2017)
- Erna at War (2020)
