= Cirkusrevyen =

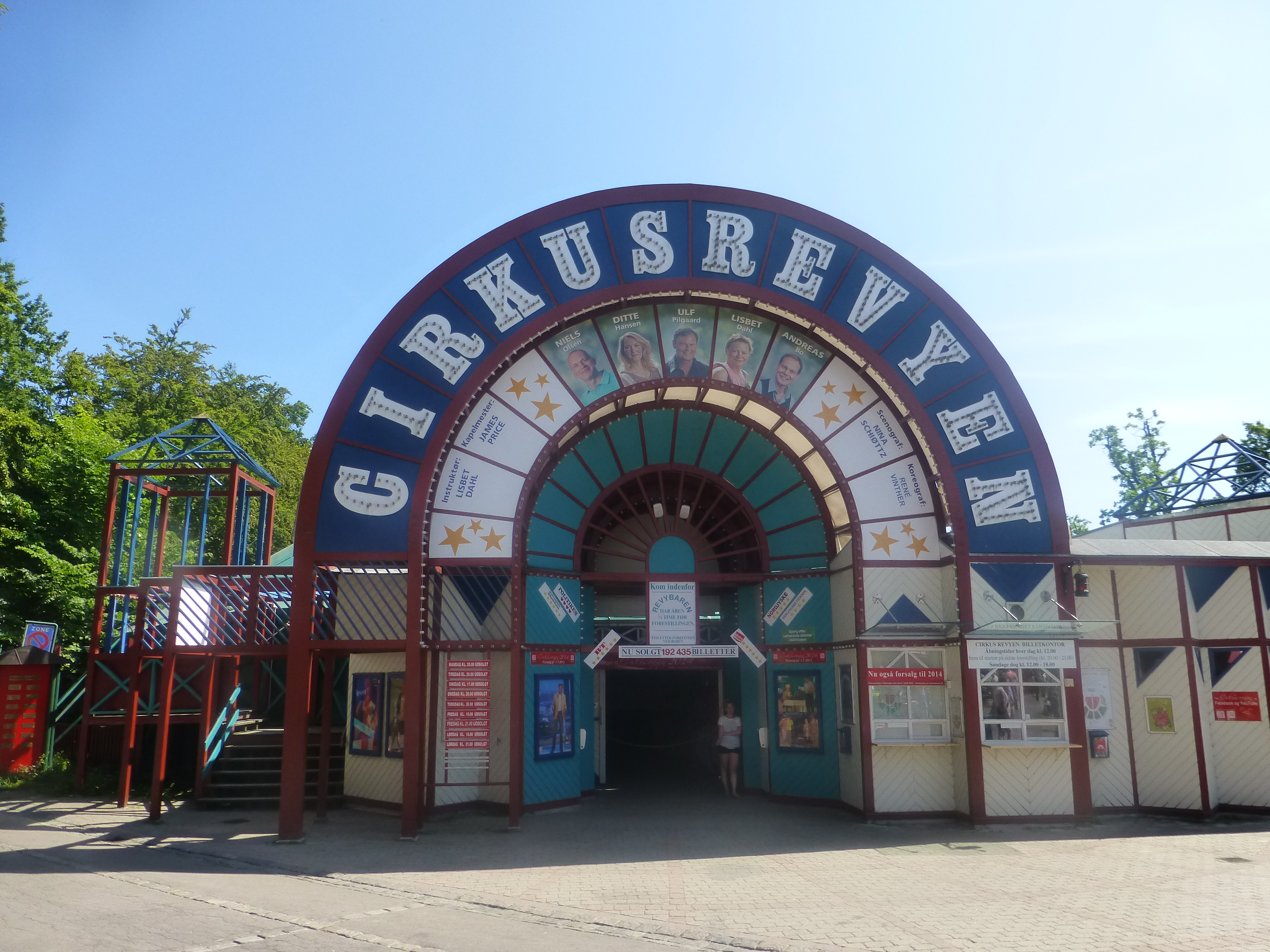
The amusement park Dyrehavsbakken north of Copenhagen

Cirkusrevyen is a Danish revue, performed annually in a tent in Dyrehavsbakken, north of Copenhagen.

== History ==
Cirkusrevyen ("Circus Revue") was founded in 1935 by restaurateur Carl Pehrsson, actors Osvald Helmuth, Oscar Holst, and the musician Herman Gellin.

The young Aage Stentoft was the first accompanist for Cirkusrevyen. He was hired, just as he arrived to Copenhagen from Holbæk. He wrote the melody for many of the songs in the first years such as "Molak molak mak mak mak", "Dit hjerte er i fare Andresen"(Your heart is in danger Andresen), "I den mellemste køje", "Degnens vise", "Schaldemose", and "Hen te' kommoden og tebavs igen".

In the Danish Broadcasting Corporation show "Omkring Aage Stentoft" (Around Aage Stentoft) from 1984 he told, how he got involved. He was applying for a job as a piano player in the revue. He could not play sheet music and played all his life by ear. He was hired on condition that he would buy a share in the revue. Stentoft believed in both the idea, the names and himself, so he took the offer. During one of the first rehearsals Ludvig Brandstrup became irritable when Aage Stentoft made a few mistakes, Brandstrup shouted: "Who the H... is that hillbilly at the piano?" Stentoft got up, took a bow and said: "He is the one financing the revue!"

Cirkusrevyen has been performed annually in a tent in Dyrehavsbakken. The only exception was 1945, when the tent was erected at the site of the burnt down Forum Copenhagen.
