= Louise Mieritz =

Danish actress

- Born: 30 April 1971 (age 55); Århus, Denmark
- Occupation: Actor

Louise Mieritz (born 30 April 1971 in Århus) is a Danish actress, best known for her roles in the Dogme 95 films The Idiots and Se til venstre, der er en Svensker.

== Partial filmography ==
- The Idiots (1998)
- Se til venstre, der er en Svensker (2003)
- Tid til forandring (2004)
- Anklaget (2005)
- Den store dag (2005)
- The Boss of It All (2006)
- Max Embarrassing 2 (2011)
