= Terribly Happy =

2008 Danish crime film

- U.S. theatrical release poster
- Directed by: Henrik Ruben Genz
- Screenplay by: Henrik Ruben Genz; Dunja Gry Jensen
- Based on: Frygtelig lykkelig by Erling Jepsen
- Produced by: Tina Dalhoff; Thomas Gammeltoft
- Starring: Jakob Cedergren; Lene Maria Christensen
- Cinematography: Jørgen Johansson
- Edited by: Kasper Leick
- Music by: Kaare Bjerkø
- Release date: 2 October 2008
- Running time: 90 minutes
- Country: Denmark
- Language: Danish
- Box office: $2,828,984

Terribly Happy (Danish: Frygtelig lykkelig) is a 2008 Danish crime film directed by Henrik Ruben Genz, based on Erling Jepsen's 2004 eponymous novel.

== Plot ==
Copenhagen policeman Robert Hansen has been reassigned by his supervisor, the chief of police in Tønder, to a temporary post as the sole police officer in a village named Skarrild, apparently situated in the coastal marshes. In fact, the book is set in Højer, which is also where the film was shot. Robert was just out of therapy for a breakdown he suffered after threatening his wife and her lover with a gun. He longs for his stay here to be over quickly so that he can reunite with his daughter, Josefine, who has been told he is in Australia.

In Skarrild, Robert meets some of the unusual locals, Dr. Zerleng and his two cronies, the grocer and the priest, who are looking for him to become the fourth player in their regular card game. He also meets Ingelise Buhl, a victim of marital abuse, who sets about insinuating herself into Robert's daily life. Robert also visits the local bicycle shop, but no one is there, and he is told the owner suddenly disappeared some time ago. Following a few minor incidents, it becomes clear to him that the residents prefer to mete out justice in their own way, rather than involve the authorities in Tønder.

In an effort to be protective of Ingelise, Robert develops feelings for her, and after an instance of abuse by her husband, Jørgen, he goes to her home to check on her. He enters through an open door, to find Jørgen passed out on the stairs leading up to their bedroom. He finds Ingelise lying in bed, somewhat battered, and she begins to seduce him. He succumbs, and when Ingelise's moans threaten to rouse Jørgen, Robert muffles her with a pillow, accidentally suffocating her. He is able to sneak away without waking Jørgen, who is still on the stairs in a drunken stupor. The next day, the locals are alerted, and Robert reenters the scene of his mishap to investigate. When the doctor arrives to examine the body, Robert makes a vague attempt at telling the truth, but is coerced by the doctor, who declares the death is due to cardiac arrest. He doesn't want the Tonder authorities in on this, even though he believes that Jørgen actually killed his wife, and says he doesn't want their daughter, Dorthe left an orphan. Robert is conflicted and suffers guilt.

As Robert prepares to attend Ingelise's funeral, he realizes he has lost a button from his uniform pocket during their tussle. At the funeral luncheon, he is advised by the priest to keep an eye on Jørgen because the townsfolk don't like wife-killers, and they all believe that Jørgen is guilty. That night, Robert parks outside Jørgen's house and in the morning, sees several men in two cars taking him away, and follows them to the outskirts of town, where they are forcing Jørgen at gunpoint to enter the bog. For the first time, Robert pulls out his pistol, aims it at the men and tells them to desist. He is then able to get Jørgen out of the bog and takes him home. He finds Dorthe hiding at the grocer's, where she tells him that she saw him leaving her house the night Ingelise died. He is able to convince her it is a misunderstanding, and takes her back to her father.

Later, Jørgen goes to the bar and challenges Robert to a drinking duel. After six beers and five shots each, the two end up at Robert's apartment, where Jørgen pulls out Robert's missing uniform button. He has an idea what happened, so Robert goes for the gun in his desk drawer and shoots Jørgen once, and again moments later. the second shot being fatal. He then takes Jørgen's body to the bog. He drives back to town and falls asleep in his police car.

The next morning, the Tønder chief of police shows up and Robert is taken along to investigate a boot (Jørgen's boot) found in the bog. Expecting the worst, Robert goes back to the chief's cruiser to await his fate. He is joined there by the chief of police, who tells him they dredged up the body of the bicycle shop owner, and says that they could just say that Jørgen committed suicide and no one would be the wiser and that Robert could soon be back in Copenhagen at his old job, and close to his daughter. That would make things simpler. Robert manages a slight smile at the thought of being out of this place and back home again.

Robert is seen packing his bags and getting ready to leave Skarrild behind. He stops by at the doctor's ongoing card game to say goodbye, but is told that they know exactly what happened with Ingelise and Jørgen. They tell him they are glad to be rid of them because it has reduced the tension in the town, but they know things about him that could hurt him in Copenhagen. The grocer adds, "You're our man now, Robert." Robert sits down at the table to become their fourth player.

== Cast ==
- Jakob Cedergren as Robert Hansen
- Lene Maria Christensen as Ingelise Buhl
- Kim Bodnia as Jørgen Buhl
- Lars Brygmann as Dr. Zerleng
- Anders Hove as Købmand Moos
- Jens Jørn Spottag as Politimester
- Henrik Lykkegaard as Præst
- Bodil Jørgensen as Bartender
- Peter Hesse Overgaard as Helmuth
- Niels Skousen as Hansi
- Lars Lunøe as Nissum
- Sune Q. Geertsen as 'Øko' Tage (credited as Sune Geertsen)
- Mathilde Maack as Dorthe
- An Le as Fru Købmand Moos
- Taina Anneli R. Berg as Lone 'TP' (credited as Taina Anneli Berg)
- Puk Scharbau as Hannes Stemme (voice)
- Kenn Bruun as Svend 'Mangler Penge'
- Mads Ole Langelund Larsen as Knud 'Langfinger'
- Joakim Schierning as Jannik
- Bent Larsen as Betjent
- Thorkild Demuth as Naboen

== Reception ==
The film received strong reviews from film critics. Review aggregator Rotten Tomatoes shows that 88% of 48 critics (all but one of the top 16 critics) gave the film a positive review, with a rating average of 7.3 out of 10, concluding that "this knotty Danish noir thriller steers audiences into some nicely unexpected territory." Metacritic, which assigns a weighted average score out of 1–100 reviews from film critics, gives a rating score of 74 based on 18 reviews.

Alissa Simon of Variety wrote that "A southern Jutland village hides as many secrets as the nearby bog in Danish helmer Henrik Ruben Genz's Terribly Happy".

According to Ed Symkus of Holland Sentinel "If it weren’t for the cars and the telephones and the contemporary small-town setting, “Terribly Happy” could easily be mistaken for an old-fashioned Western".

The New York Times's Stephen Holden was quoted saying that "[the film is] not a horror movie but a witty, expertly constructed psychological thriller", while V.A. Musetto of the New York Post called the actors "charmingly low-key" and called the director's lensing as an "add[ition] to the offbeat aura".

Elise Nakhnikian of Slant Magazine compared the film to Coen brothers' Blood Simple, but then retracted that comparison, saying that "[this] parallel’s not perfect either", adding his personal feeling: "the Coens looking down on the people in Blood Simple, detached and a little contemptuous, while Terribly Happy director Henrik Ruben Genz and screenwriter Dunja Gry Jensen seem to be a lot more sympathetic to their clay-footed characters".

== Awards ==
Terribly Happy was first shown at the 43rd Karlovy Vary International Film Festival in July 2008, in the Czech Republic, where it won the Crystal Globe (Grand Prize).

The film won several Robert Awards in 2009, including Best Danish Film, Best Director, Best Female Lead, Best Actor, Best Screenplay, and Best Cinematographer.

It was the official submission of Denmark for the category of Best Foreign Language Film for the 82nd Academy Awards in March 2010.
