= 1916 Danish West Indian Islands sale referendum =

Danish referendum on the sale of the Danish West Indies to the United States

- 14 December 1916

Results
Choice	Votes	%
Yes	283,670	64.20%
No	158,157	35.80%
Valid votes	441,827	98.38%
Invalid or blank votes	7,267	1.62%
Total votes	449,094	100.00%
Registered voters/turnout	1,200,000	37.42%

A referendum on the sale of the Danish West Indian Islands to the United States of America was held in Denmark on 14 December 1916. The non-binding referendum saw 283,670 vote in favor of the sale of the Danish West Indian Islands and 158,157 against. The residents of the islands were not allowed to vote on the matter, but in an unofficial vote on Saint Croix arranged by David Hamilton Jackson, 4,027 voted in favor of the sale and only seven voted against. As a result of the referendum the islands were formally relinquished to the United States by the Treaty of the Danish West Indies on 31 March 1917 as the United States Virgin Islands for a sum of US$25,000,000 in gold.

== Background ==
Two of the islands had been in Danish possession since the 17th century and Saint Croix since 1733. The highly profitable period of the colony had been from around 1750 to 1850 based on transit trade and the production of rum and sugar using African slaves as labor. By the second half of the 19th century the sugar production was embattled by the cultivation of sugar beets, and although the slaves had been emancipated in 1848, the agricultural land and the trade was still controlled by the white population, and the living conditions of the descendants of the slaves were poor.

At the negotiations for the Treaty of Vienna after the defeat in the Second Schleswig War in 1864, Denmark had tried to use the islands as a trade-in for South Jutland, but the Prussian Government was not interested.

At the eve of the American Civil War, the United States became interested in the islands as the possible location of a Caribbean naval base. A referendum on transferring ownership from Denmark to the United States was held on 9 January 1868 on the islands of Sankt Jan and Sankt Thomas, two of three main islands in the colony. Of the votes cast, 98% were in favor of the transfer. On 24 October 1867 the Danish parliament, the Rigsdag, ratified a treaty on the sale of the two islands for a sum of US$7,500,000. However, the United States Senate did not ratify the treaty due to concerns over a number of natural disasters that had struck the islands and a political feud with and the possible impeachment of President Andrew Johnson.

Negotiations resumed in 1899 following the unofficial diplomacy of Walter Christmas. On 24 January 1902 Washington signed a convention on the transfer of the islands for a sum of US$5,000,000. One chamber of the Danish parliament—the Folketing—passed the proposal, but in the other chamber—the Landsting—it failed with 32 votes against 32. In particular the conservative party Højre opposed it on the grounds that the treaty did not ensure the local population a vote on the matter, and that it did not grant them US citizenship or freedom from customs duty on the export of sugar to the United States. According to historian Povl Engelstoft, there was no doubt that Council President Johan Henrik Deuntzer was privately against the sale even though his party, the Venstre Reform Party, supported it. When the Landsting failed to pass the proposal, Deuntzer made a statement that neither did he see a reason for the cabinet to step down, nor would he dissolve the Landsting or assume responsibility for any further work related to the sale. This brought the process to a halt.

== Negotiations ==
Famous labor leader David Hamilton Jackson, made a visit to Copenhagen in May 1915. He successfully raised awareness of the growing social desperation on the islands and the need to enter the customs territory of the United States in order for the islands to be able to cope with their economic crisis. After his visit a majority of the Folketing was convinced that the Danish supremacy of the islands had to end. The First World War had created a new situation: the relations between Germany and the United States were becoming worse as a consequence of the German submarine warfare, and the Americans were concerned that in the event of an invasion of neutral Denmark the Germans might take control of the islands. This would be unacceptable to the Americans as stated in the Monroe Doctrine.

The Danish government was convinced that the islands had to be sold for the sake of both the residents and Danish security, and that a transfer would have to be realized before the United States entered the war, so that the transfer would not become a violation of the Danish neutrality. During May 1915, Foreign Minister of Denmark Erik Scavenius contacted the American government with the message that he believed that the islands ought to be sold to the United States and that although he would not make an official proposal, "if the United States gave any encouragement to the consideration of the possibility of such a sale, it might be possible."

On 29 October 1915 United States Secretary of State Robert Lansing managed to reopen the negotiations. The negotiations, which lasted until August 1916, were kept absolutely secret in order to maintain the Danish neutrality. Although rumors of the future sale did leak to the press, they were denied categorically by both Scavenius and Minister of Finance Edvard Brandes. During 1916, the two sides agreed to a sale price of $25,000,000. The United States accepted a Danish demand for a declaration stating that they would "not object to the Danish Government extending their political and economic interests to the whole of Greenland." Historian Bo Lidegaard questions the utility of such a declaration, however, as the United States had never disputed Danish sovereignty.

== Government crisis ==
The government informed the parliament of the negotiations and their result in August 1916, and the message aroused bitter feelings in particular among the conservatives and to some degree within Venstre. The outrage was partially based on the government's readiness to hand off a part of the kingdom for money and partially on the secrecy regarding all the preparations and that the denials by the two ministers had been completely contrary to facts. Those who opposed the sale now demanded that the treaty should be reviewed by a new parliament, with the intent to trigger a new election and hoping that the government would thereby lose its majority in the Folketing. In response, the government proposed a referendum on the issue as had recently become possible with the Constitution of 1915. The Landsting rejected this proposal, triggering a government crisis.

The prospect of forming a broad-based government of national unity proved to be extremely difficult due to the poisoned atmosphere, and after Scavenius on 6 September had rejected an offer from Christian X of Denmark to form a new government, the parties found a compromise on 30 September: each of the three opposition parties would appoint one of their members to enter the cabinet as Ministers without Portfolio, a commission to document the negotiations on the sale would be established, and a referendum would be held. The referendum would include voters in the Faroe Islands, but neither Iceland nor Greenland, nor would it include the West Indian Islands, and it would be non-binding in the sense that in the case of a majority in favor of the sale the parliament would still have the right to reject it. The commission published its report on 2 December with the recommendation to approve the sale.

== Results ==
The referendum was held on 14 December 1916. As the Election Act of 1915, which significantly increased the number of eligible voters, was used for the referendum even though it did not otherwise take effect until 1918, the exact number of eligible voters is unknown, but has been estimated at 1,200,000.

Choice	Votes	%
For	283,670	64.20
Against	158,157	35.80
Total	441,827	100.00
Valid votes	441,827	98.38
Invalid/blank votes	7,267	1.62
Total votes	449,094	100.00
Source: Nohlen & Stöver

In an unofficial vote on Saint Croix arranged by Hamilton Jackson 4,027 voted in favor of the sale and only seven voted against. On 20 December the Danish parliament ratified the treaty, and on 9 March 1917 Christian X of Denmark officially said goodbye to the islands in an open letter. On 1 April the formal transfer of the islands took place, only five days before the United States declared war on Germany.

In an attempt to create national reconciliation, most of the 25 million dollars was spent in Southern Jutland after the Schleswig Plebiscites and the return of the region to Danish rule in 1920.
