= D. Hamilton Jackson =

American labor leader

David Hamilton Jackson
- Born: September 28, 1884; Estate East Hill, St. Croix, Danish West Indies
- Died: May 30, 1946 (aged 61); St. Croix, U.S. Virgin Islands
- Occupations: Educator, bookkeeper, newspaper editor, lawyer, judge, councilman
- Known for: Civil rights and labor movement organization and activism

David Hamilton Jackson (September 28, 1884 – May 30, 1946) was a labor rights advocate in the Danish West Indies, later the United States Virgin Islands. Jackson was an important figure in the struggle for increased civil rights and workers' rights on the islands. He petitioned for freedom of the press, and organized the St. Croix Labor Union. Following the transfer of the territory to American control in 1917, he lobbied for US citizenship for the islanders.

== Biography ==
David Hamilton Jackson was born on September 28, 1884 in Estate East Hill, Christiansted, Saint Croix. His father was a schoolteacher and his mother was a free black from British Antigua. He became in various local reform movements starting in 1902. Jackson studied law at Howard University in 1910. He worked as an educator but was dismissed by the Danish school authorities after criticizing the church.

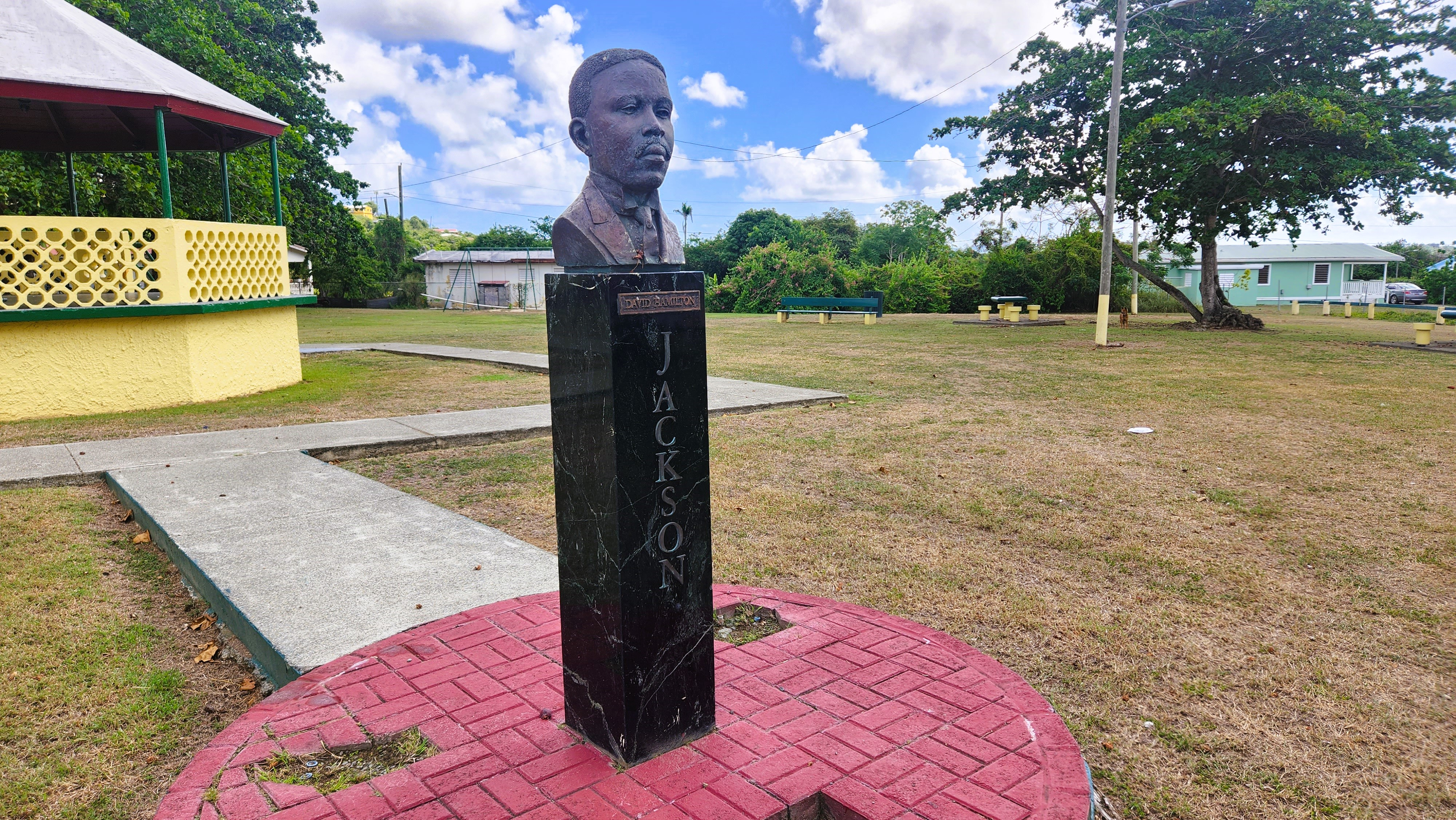
Jackson's bust in Grove Place.

Jackson began writing contributions to the local white-owned newspaper West End News in 1915. After writing a number of articles critical of governor general L. C. Helweg-Larsen, police captain N. C. M. Fuglede, and administrative director H. O. Schmiegelow, he was banned from the West End News. He then began giving speeches advocating for laborers' rights to raise funds for a trip to Denmark, visiting the country in May 1915. While in Denmark, he met Danish Finance Minister Edvard Brandes, Danish West Indies governor Christian Helweg-Larsen, and King Christian X, where he advocated for an expansion of the electorate, freedom of assembly and press, improved public services, economic reform, and a new governor. Jackson met with Hans Nielsen and other activists and to discuss the strategy of the Danish labor movement. Jackson's petitions led to the repeal of a 1779 law which prohibited independent newspapers and enforced strict censorship on all publications in the territory; the first Black members appointed to the Danish colonial legislature; and a bill to fund land distribution to create homesteads for landless laborers. Jackson returned to Frederiksted in September 1915. There he established his newspaper, The Herald, which he wrote and edited in collaboration with Danish newspaper Social Demokraten. The day of the newspaper's first publication, November 1, 1915, is celebrated as an annual public holiday known as "Liberty Day", D. Hamilton Jackson Day, or Bull and Bread Day in the U.S. Virgin Islands.

Jackson used the newspaper to help establish the St. Croix Labor Union in 1915. In response to an accusation by a local plantation manager that Jackson was organizing a revolt, the Danish government ordered the cruiser Valkyrien to the Danish West Indies. In January 1916, under Jackson's leadership, the St. Croix Labor Union went on strike and after 40 days on strike, negotiated an agreement with the Planters Association to raise the wage of sugar cane laborers from 20 cents to 35 cents, a nine-hour work day and five-day workweek with overtime pay, among other concessions. Following the strike, laborers on Saint Thomas also formed a union and struck for better working conditions. The same year, he lobbied for the transfer of the islands to American control. After his visit, a majority of the Folketing was convinced that Danish rule over the islands should be ended and sold the islands to the United States in October 1916. He married Theolinda Pentheny in 1916. He studied at La Salle Extension University and the Hamilton College of Law in 1920 before attending the University of Indiana Indianapolis, where he received a law degree, passed the bar and became an attorney of criminal law in 1921. During the initial American occupation, he served on the Colonial Council from 1923 to 1926. He was a judge on the Municipal Court of St. Croix from 1931 to 1941. He served on the Municipal Council from 1941 to 1946. He died on May 30, 1946.

A residential community in Christiansted is named after him. He is also honored in the Grove Place settlement across from a baobab tree.

== See also ==
- 1878 St. Croix labor riot
