= 1916 Danish West Indies status referendum =

Ballot measure in the Danish West Indies

- 17 August 1916

Results
Choice	Votes	%
Yes	4,027	99.83%
No	7	0.17%

An unofficial referendum on the sale of the islands to the United States was held in the Danish West Indies on 17 August 1916. The proposal was approved by 99.83% of voters, with only seven people voting against. It followed the Treaty of the Danish West Indies, which was signed on 4 August, and also approved by a referendum in Denmark in December 1916. The islands were transferred to the United States in 1917.

No vote was held on Water Island, which had been sold by Denmark to the East Asiatic Company, a private shipping company, in 1905, and was no longer part of the colony.

== Results ==
Choice	Votes	%
For	4,027	99.83
Against	7	0.17
Total	4,034	100.00
Source: Direct Democracy

== See also ==
- 1868 Danish West Indies status referendum
