= 1868 Danish West Indies status referendum =

Ballot measure in the Danish West Indies

- 9 January 1868

Results
Choice	Votes	%
Yes	1,244	98.26%
No	22	1.74%

A referendum on transferring ownership to the United States was held on 9 January 1868 on the islands of Sankt Jan and Sankt Thomas, two of three main islands in the Danish West Indies. In the referendum, held by universal male suffrage, voters could approve or reject the outcome of negotiations for the sale of the two islands to the United States for US$7.5 million. The third island, Sankt Croix, was to be sold separately to the US at a later date.

The sale was approved by 98.26% of voters. Although it was a binding referendum, the US Senate finally reneged on the agreement in 1870. The Islands were later transferred to the United States after a second referendum in 1916 and the subsequent Treaty of the Danish West Indies.

== Results ==
Choice	Votes	%
For	1,244	98.26
Against	22	1.74
Total	1,266	100.00
Source: Direct Democracy

== See also ==
- 1870 Dominican Republic annexation referendum
- 1877 Saint Barthélemy status referendum
- 1916 Danish West Indies status referendum
