= Danish West Indies =

Danish colony in the Caribbean (1672–1917)

Coordinates: 18.3250°N 64.8350°W

Danish West Indies Dansk Vestindien
- 1672–1917
- Flag of Denmark Royal coat of arms of Denmark

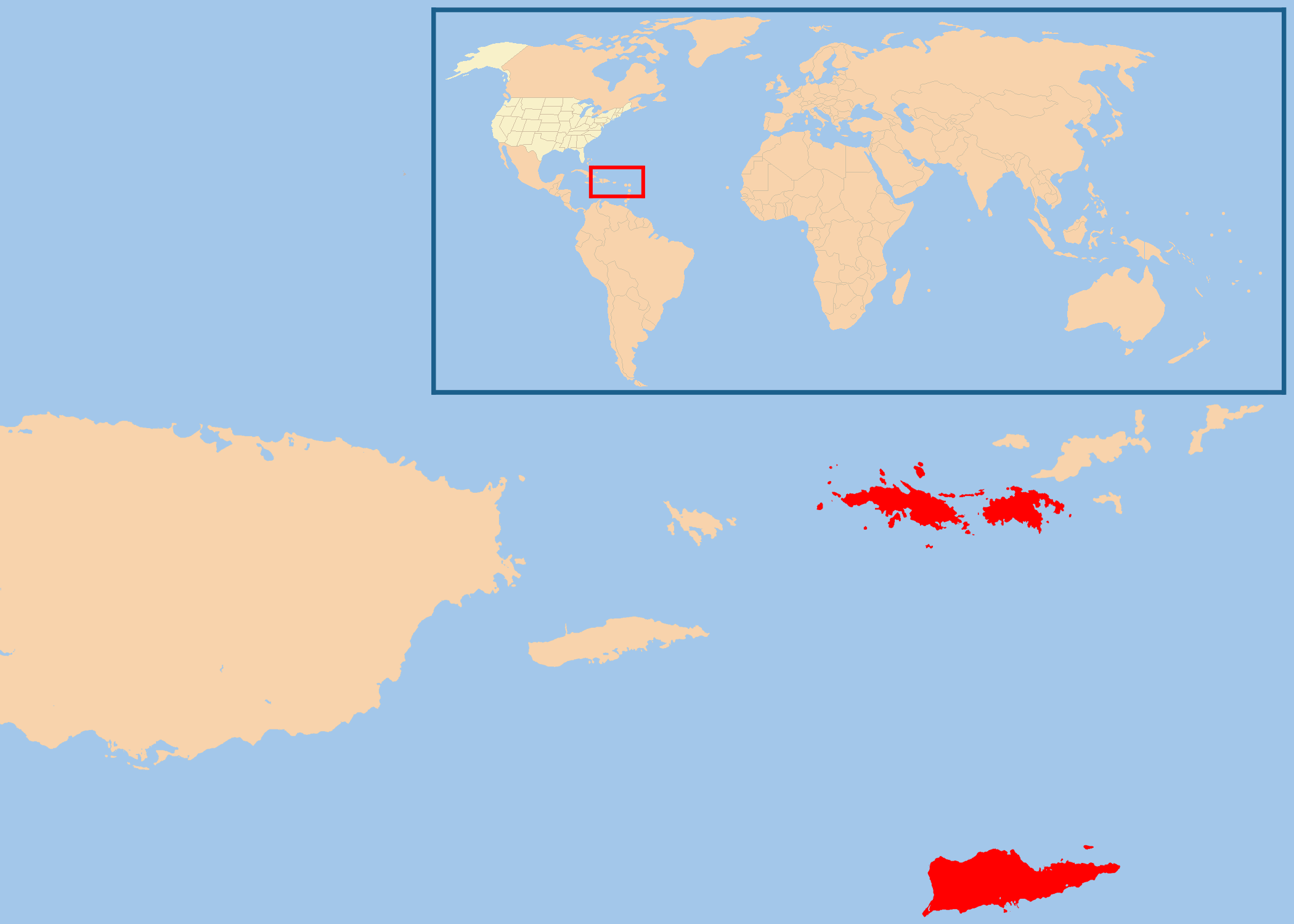
- Status: Colony of Denmark–Norway (1672–1814); Colony of Denmark
- Capital: Charlotte Amalie (1672–1754,1871–1917); Christiansted (1754–1871)
- Common languages: Danish (official); English; Virgin Islands Creole; Negerhollands; Other languages
- Governor-General
  - 1756–1766: Christian Leberecht von Prøck (first)
  - 1916–1917: Henri Konow (last)
- History
  - Danish West India Company takes possession of Saint Thomas: 1672
  - Brandenburger Company-St. Thomas lease: 1685–1754
  - Saint John colonized and claimed: 1717–1718
  - Danish West India Company purchases Saint Croix from French West India Company: 1733
  - Treaty of the Danish West Indies: 31 March 1917

Area
- 400 km^{2} (150 sq mi)

Population
  - 1911: 27,000
- Currency: Danish rigsdaler (until 1875); Rigsdaler (1754–1849); Daler (1849–1917); Latin Coin Union (from 1905); Danish krone (1875–1917)
Succeeded by
United States Virgin Islands

The Danish West Indies (Danish: Dansk Vestindien), also known as the Danish Virgin Islands (Danish: Danske Jomfruøer) or the Danish Antilles, were a Danish colony in the Caribbean, consisting of the islands of Saint Thomas with 83 square kilometres (32 sq mi), Saint John (Danish: St. Jan) with 49 square kilometres (19 sq mi), and Saint Croix with 220 square kilometres (85 sq mi).

The islands were purchased by the United States in 1917 and became known as the United States Virgin Islands. An exception for this was Water Island, which was bought by the US Government in 1944, and became part of the US Virgin Islands in 1996.

== Historical overview ==
=== Acquisition ===
The Danish West India-Guinea Company annexed uninhabited St. Thomas in 1672. It annexed St. John in 1718 and bought St. Croix from France (King Louis XV) on 28 June 1733. When the Danish West India-Guinea Company went bankrupt in 1754, King Frederik V of Denmark–Norway assumed direct control of the three islands. Although, during the Napoleonic Wars, Britain twice occupied the Danish West Indies, first in 1801–1802 and again in 1807–1815.

=== Colonisation and slavery ===
The economy of the Danish West Indies depended on slavery. Danish colonisers in the West Indies aimed to exploit the profitable triangular trade, involving the export of firearms and other manufactured goods to Africa in exchange for slaves, who were then transported to the Caribbean to work the sugar plantations. Caribbean colonies, in turn, exported sugar, rum and molasses to Denmark. After a rebellion, slavery was officially abolished in 1848, leading to the near economic collapse of the plantations.

=== Disposition ===
In 1852, the Rigsdagen, the Danish parliament, first debated the sale of the increasingly unprofitable colony. Denmark tried several times to sell or exchange the Danish West Indies in the late 19th and early 20th centuries with the United States and the German Empire. The islands were eventually sold to the United States for $25 million ($628,250,000 in 2025) which took over the administration on 31 March 1917 and renamed the territory the United States Virgin Islands.

== History ==
=== Foundation ===
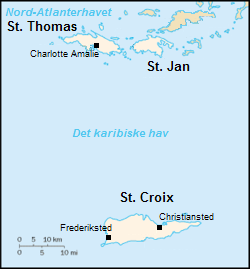
A map of the Danish West Indies

Merchants in Copenhagen asked King Christian IV for permission to establish a West Indian trading company in 1622, but, by the time an eight-year monopoly on trade with the West Indies, Virginia, Brazil and Guinea was granted on 25 January 1625, the failure of the Danish East India and Iceland Companies and the beginning of Danish involvement in the Thirty Years' War dried up any interest in the idea.

Prince Frederick organized a trading mission to Barbados in 1647 under Gabriel Gomez and the de Casseres brothers, but it and a 1651 expedition of two ships were unsuccessful. It was not until Erik Smit's private 1652 expedition aboard the Fortuna was successful that interest in the West Indies' trade grew into an interest in the creation of a new Danish colony.

Smit's 1653 expedition and a separate expedition of five ships were quite successful, but Smit's third expedition found his two vessels captured for a loss of 32,000 rigsdaler. Two years later, a Danish flotilla was destroyed by a hurricane in August. Smit returned from his fourth expedition in 1663 and formally proposed the settlement of St. Thomas to the king in April 1665.

After only three weeks' deliberation, the scheme was approved and Smit was named governor. Settlers departed aboard the Eendragt on 1 July, but the expedition was ill-starred: The ship hit two large storms and suffered from fire before reaching its destination, and then it was raided by English privateers prosecuting the Second Anglo-Dutch War, in which Denmark was allied with the Netherlands.

Smit died of illness, and a second band of privateers stole the ship and used it to trade with neighboring islands. Following a hurricane and a renewed outbreak of disease, the colony collapsed, with the English departing for the nearby French colony on Saint Croix, the Danes fleeing to Saint Christopher, and the Dutch assisting their countrymen on Ter Tholen in stealing everything of value, particularly the remaining Danish guns and ammunition.

=== Danish West India Company ===
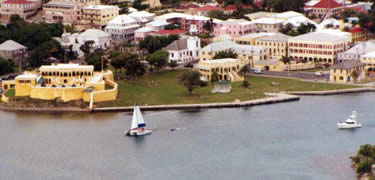
Christiansted, the main town of St. Croix in the former Danish West Indies

The Danes formed a Board of Trade in 1668 and secured a commercial treaty with Britain, providing for the unmolested settlement of uninhabited islands, in July 1670. The Danish West India Company was organized in December and formally chartered by King Christian V the next year on 11 March 1671. Jørgen Iversen Dyppel, a successful trader on Saint Christopher, was made governor and the king provided convicts from his jails and two vessels for the establishment of the colony, the yacht Den forgyldte Krone (Note: Also translated as the Golden Crown and the Gilded Crown.) and the frigate Færøe. (Note: Also written Færø, Fero, Faero, and Pharaoh.)

Den forgyldte Krone was ordered to run ahead and wait but ended up returning to Denmark after the Færøe under Capt. Zacharias Hansen Bang was delayed for repairs in Bergen. The Færøe completed her mission alone, establishing a settlement on St. Thomas on 25 May 1672. From an original contingent of 190 – 12 officials, 116 company "employees" (indentured servants), and 62 felons and former prostitutes – only 104 remained, 9 having escaped and 77 having died in transit. Another 75 died within the first year, leaving only 29 to carry on the colony.

In 1675, Iversen claimed St. John and placed two men there; in 1684, Governor Esmit granted it to two English merchants from Barbados but their men were chased off the island by two British sloops sent by Governor Stapleton of the British Leeward Islands. Further instructions in 1688 to establish a settlement on St. John seem not to have been acted on until Governor Bredal made an official establishment on 25 March 1718.

The islands quickly became a base for pirates attacking ships in the vicinity and also for the Brandenburg African Company. Governor Lorentz raised enormous taxes upon them and seized warehouses and cargoes of tobacco, sugar, and slaves in 1689 only to have his actions repudiated by the authorities in Copenhagen; his hasty action to seize Crab Island prohibited the Brandenburgers from establishing their own Caribbean colony, however. Possession of the island was subsequently disputed with the Scottish in 1698 and fully lost to the Spanish in 1811.

St. Croix was purchased from the French West India Company in 1733. In 1754, the islands were sold to king Frederick V, becoming royal Danish-Norwegian colonies.

=== Later history (1801–1917) ===
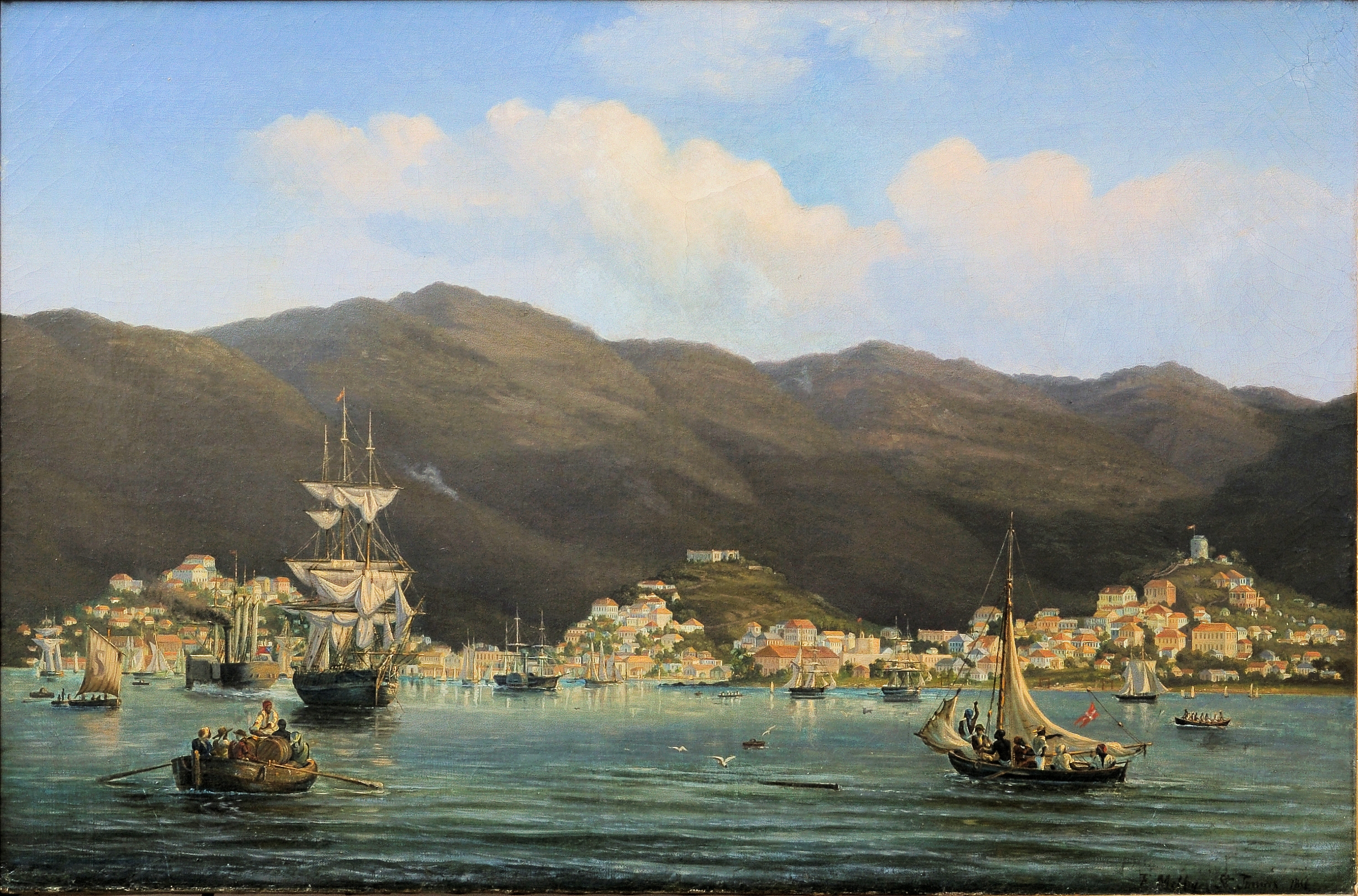
Charlotte Amalie in 1851, painted by Fritz Melbye

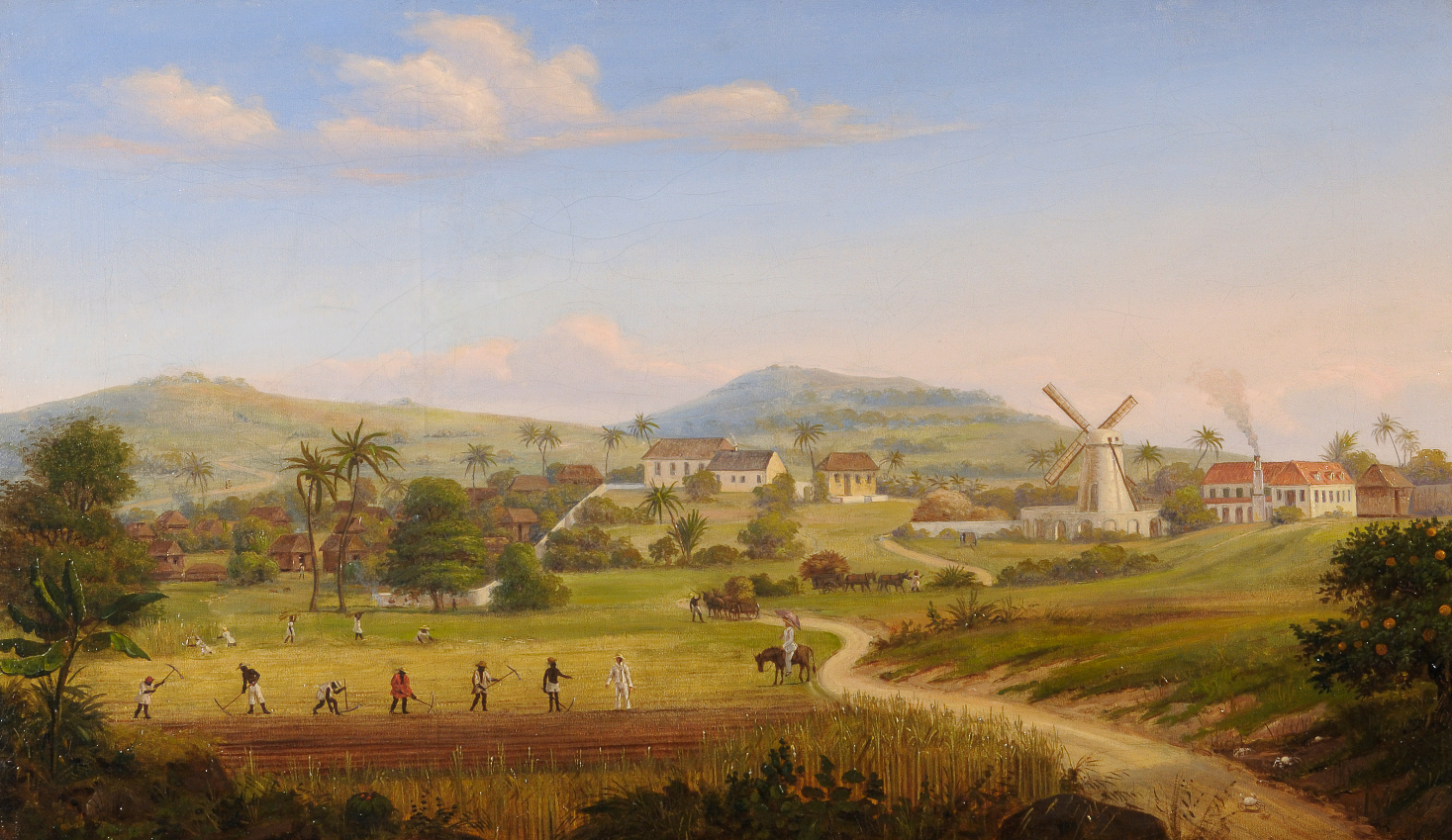
Mary's Fancy plantation on Sankt Croix, owned by George Ryan. The plantation had 126 slaves in 1816 and 105 in 1847

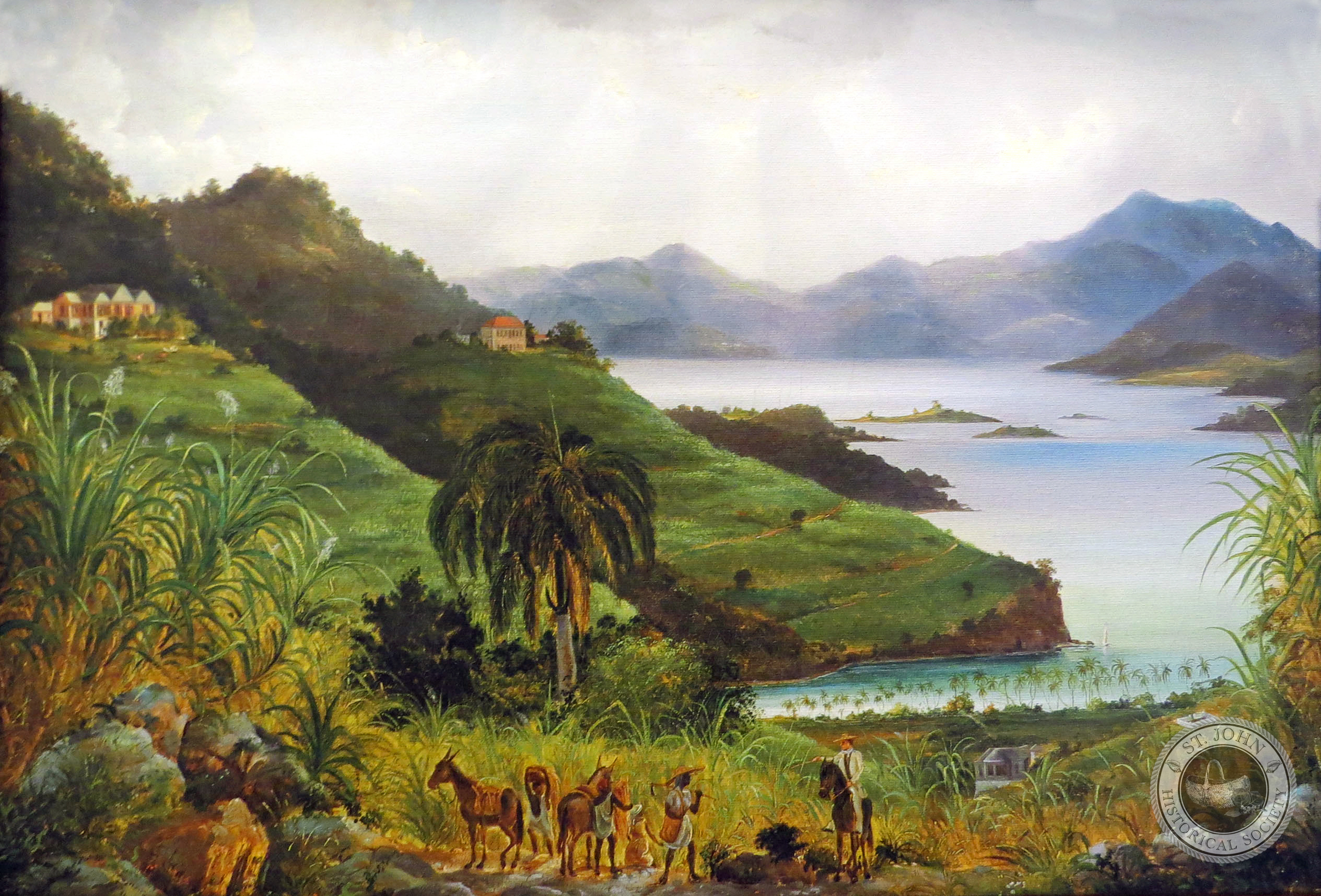
Abraham's Fancy plantation on Sankt Jan, 1852

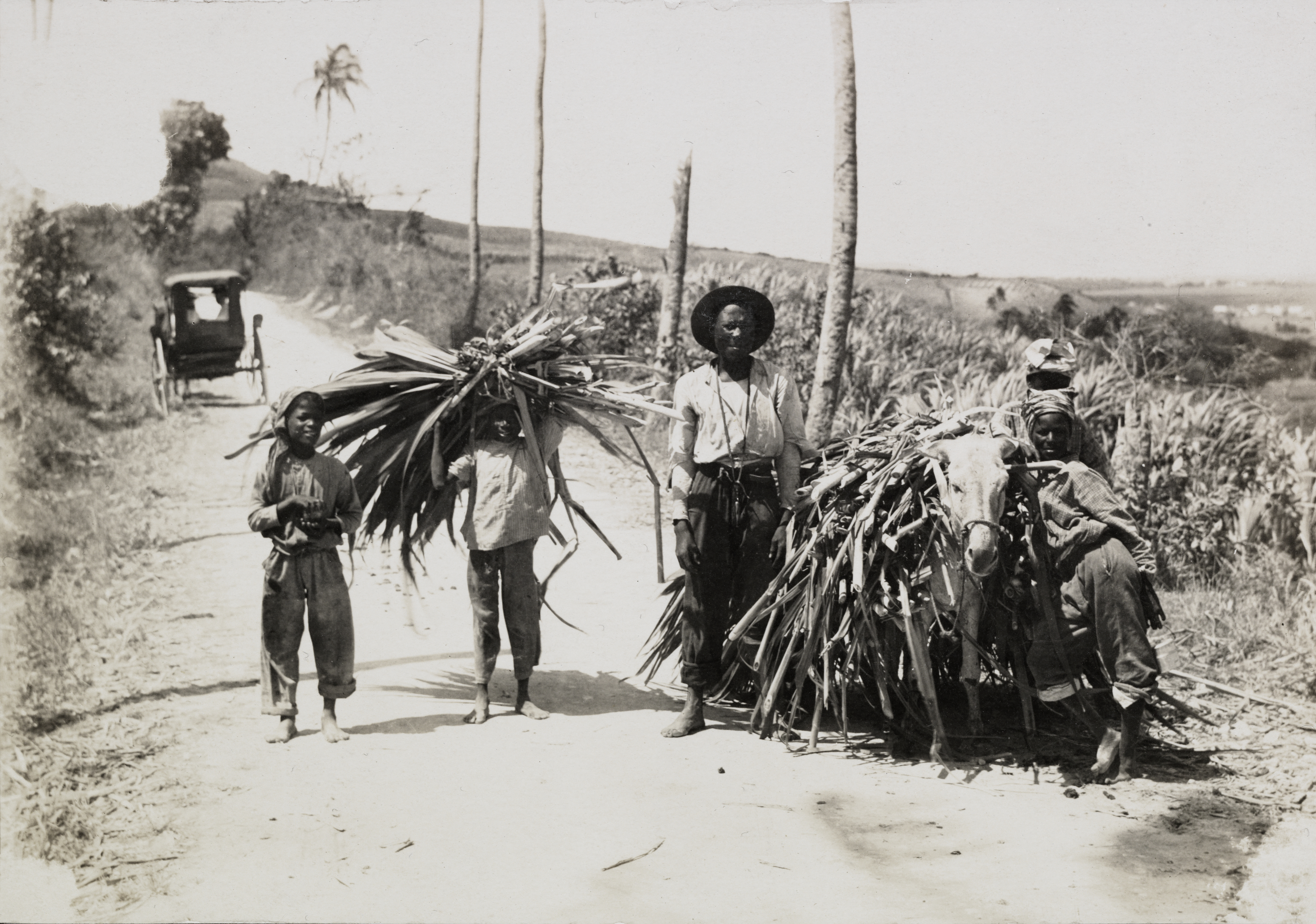
Workers in Danish West Indies with sugar cane

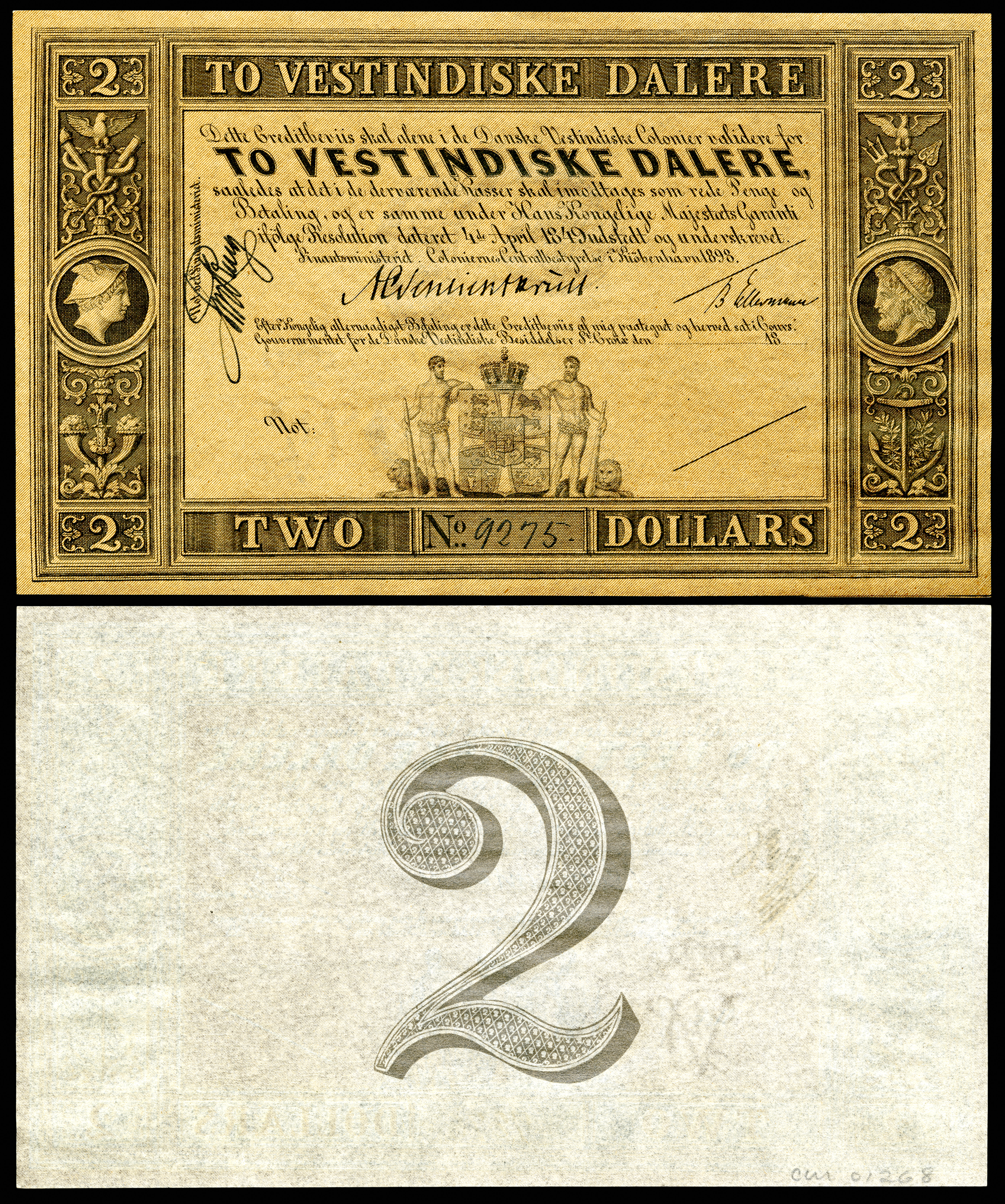
Two-daler banknote from Saint Croix in the Danish West Indies (1898)

The first British invasion and occupation of the Danish West Indies occurred during the French Revolutionary Wars, when at the end of March 1801 a British fleet arrived at St Thomas. The Danes accepted the Articles of Capitulation the British proposed and the British occupied the islands without a shot being fired. The British occupation lasted until April 1802, when the British returned the islands to Denmark.

The second British invasion of the Danish West Indies took place during the Napoleonic Wars in December 1807 when a British fleet captured St Thomas on 22 December and Saint Croix on 25 December. The Danes did not resist and the invasion was bloodless. This British occupation of the Danish West Indies lasted until 20 November 1815, when Britain returned the islands to Denmark.

By the 1850s, the Danish West Indies had a total population of about 41,000 people. The government of the islands was under a governor-general, whose jurisdiction extended to the other Danish colonies of the group. However, because of Denmark’s relatively small population in Europe, the islands had been settled mainly by planters and merchants from elsewhere in the Caribbean through a policy of ‘colonisation by invitation’, and as such the inhabitants were predominantly English in customs and in language. The islands of that period consisted of:

- St. Thomas, with a population of 12,800 and sugar and cotton as its chief exports. St. Thomas city was the capital of the island, then a free port, and the chief station of the steam-packets between Southampton, in England, and the West Indies.
- St. John, with a population of about 2,600.
- St. Croix, with a population of 25,600; though inferior to St. Thomas in commerce, it was of greater importance in extent and fertility.

The United States had been interested in the islands since at least the 1860s, when President Andrew Johnson came close to obtaining St. Thomas and St. John. Denmark agreed to sell in 1867 for $7.5 million and the local population approved the transfer in a plebiscite, but the US Senate never voted on the treaty and it expired. In 1889, there were rumors of negotiations between the Danish and the Germans for sale of the islands. In 1902, the Danish Parliament rejected both a convention and a treaty with the United States.

The United States acted again in 1915 because of the islands' strategic position near the approach to the Panama Canal, and because of a fear that Germany might seize them to use as U-boat bases during World War I. A referendum was held in Denmark on the future of the islands, which had become both a financial burden and strategic concern. On 17 January 1917, according to the Treaty of the Danish West Indies, the Danish government sold the islands to the United States for $25 million ($628 million in current prices) when the United States removed its objections to Denmark taking control of the whole of Greenland, and the U.S. and Denmark exchanged their respective treaty ratifications. Danish administration ended on 31 March 1917, when the United States took formal possession of the territory and renamed it the United States Virgin Islands. Rear Admiral James H. Oliver was the first American governor of the Danish West Indies.

At the time of the US purchase of the Danish West Indies in 1917, the colony did not include Water Island, which had been sold by Denmark to the East Asiatic Company, a private shipping company, in 1905. The company eventually sold the island to the United States in 1944, during the German occupation of Denmark in the Second World War.

== Postage stamps ==
St Thomas was a hub of the West Indies packet trade from 1851 to 1885. Denmark issued stamps for the Danish West Indies from 1856 onward.

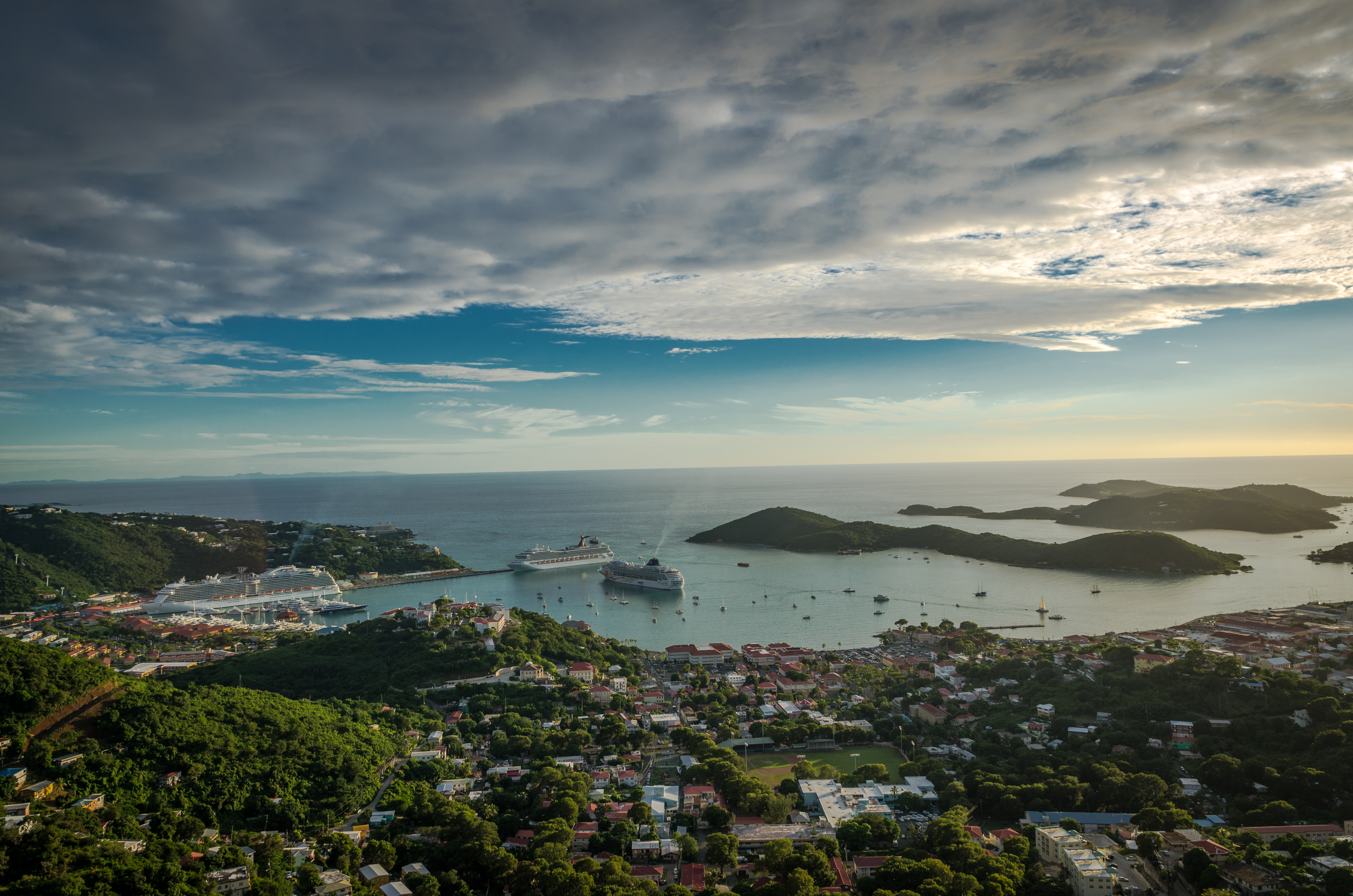
View over Charlotte Amalie

== Religion ==
The Danish West Indies were inhabited by many different cultures, and each had its own traditions and religions. The church looked after people's moral upbringing, and the king was responsible for civil order.

Freedom of religion was partially granted to the colonies to help settle the islands, as there was a shortage of willing settlers from Europe. This resulted in a large proportion being Dutch and British natives fleeing religious persecution.

Jews began settling the colony in 1655, and by 1796 the first synagogue was inaugurated. In its heyday in the mid-19th century, the Jewish community made up half of the European population. One of the earliest colonial governors, Gabriel Milan, was a Sephardic Jew.

In spite of a general tolerance of faiths, many African religions were not recognized because they typically revolved around belief in animism and magic, beliefs that were consistently met with scorn, and were regarded as immoral and inferior. It was widely believed that if slaves could be converted to Christianity they could have a better life, and effort was made to do so.

There was no state-sponsored religion in Denmark until 1849, and authorities required that all citizens observe Danish holidays.

By 1900, with a population of 30,000, a fourth of the people were Catholics, while most of the rest were Anglican, Moravian, or other Protestant, including former slaves. For decades, the Moravians had organized missions and also taken charge of the educational system.

== Slavery ==
Chattel slavery was practiced in the Danish West Indies from at least the 1670s until the abolition of slavery in 1848. Most slaves worked on plantations, particularly in sugar production, though some also worked at the harbors.

=== Demographics ===
Slaves outnumbered Europeans on all islands, often by large margins. On Saint Thomas, population expansion was recorded as 422 Africans and 317 Europeans in 1688, 555 Africans and 383 Europeans in 1699, and 3,042 Africans and 547 Europeans in 1715 (a ratio of more than 5:1), and by 1755 slaves outnumbered Europeans 12:1. On Saint John, there were 677 Africans and 123 Europeans in 1728, 1,086 Africans and 208 Europeans in 1733 (a ratio of more than 5:1), and by 1770 slaves outnumbered Europeans 19:1. On Saint Croix in 1797, there were 25,452 slaves and 2,223 Europeans (a ratio of more than 11:1) as well as 1,164 freedmen, and in 1815 there were 24,330 slaves and 180 Europeans (a ratio of more than 135:1) as well as 2,480 freedmen. At that time, freedmen (many of whom had purchased their freedom) also outnumbered Europeans on Saint Thomas and Saint John.

=== Slave trade ===
Trading African slaves was part of the transatlantic slave trade by Denmark–Norway around 1671, when the Danish West India Company was chartered, until 1 January 1803, when the 1792 law to abolish the slave trade came into effect.

By 1778, it was estimated that the Danes were bringing about 3,000 Africans to the Danish West Indies yearly for enslavement. These transports continued until the end of 1802, when a 1792 law by Crown Prince Regent Frederik that banned the trade of slaves came into effect.

=== Slave codes ===
Laws and regulations in the Danish West Indies were based on Denmark's laws, but the local government was allowed to adapt them to match local conditions. For example, things like animals, land, and buildings were regulated according to Danish law, but Danish law did not regulate slavery. Slaves were treated as common property, and therefore did not necessitate specific laws.

In 1733, differentiation between slaves and other property was implied by a regulation that stated that slaves had their own will and thus could behave inappropriately or be disobedient. There was a general consensus that if the slaves were punished too hard or were malnourished, the slaves would start to rebel. This was borne out by the 1733 slave insurrection on St. John, where many plantation owners and their families were killed by the Akwamu, including Breffu, before it was suppressed later the following year. In 1755 Frederick V of Denmark issued more new Regulations, in which slaves were guaranteed the right not to be separated from their children and the right to medical support during periods of illness or old age. However, the colonial government had the ability to amend laws and regulations according to local conditions, and thus the regulations were never enacted in the colony, on grounds that it was more disadvantageous than advantageous.

=== 1733 slave insurrection ===
The 1733 slave insurrection on St. John, which lasted from November 1733 until August 1734, was one of the earliest and longest slave rebellions in the Americas. The insurrection started on 23 November 1733, when 150 slaves, primarily Akwamus, revolted against plantation owners and managers. The slaves captured the fort in Coral Bay and took control of most of the island.

Planters regained control by the end of May 1734, after the Akwamu were defeated by several hundred better-armed French and Swiss troops sent in April from Martinique, a French colony. Colony militia continued to hunt down maroons and finally declared the rebellion at an end in late August 1734.

=== Emancipation ===
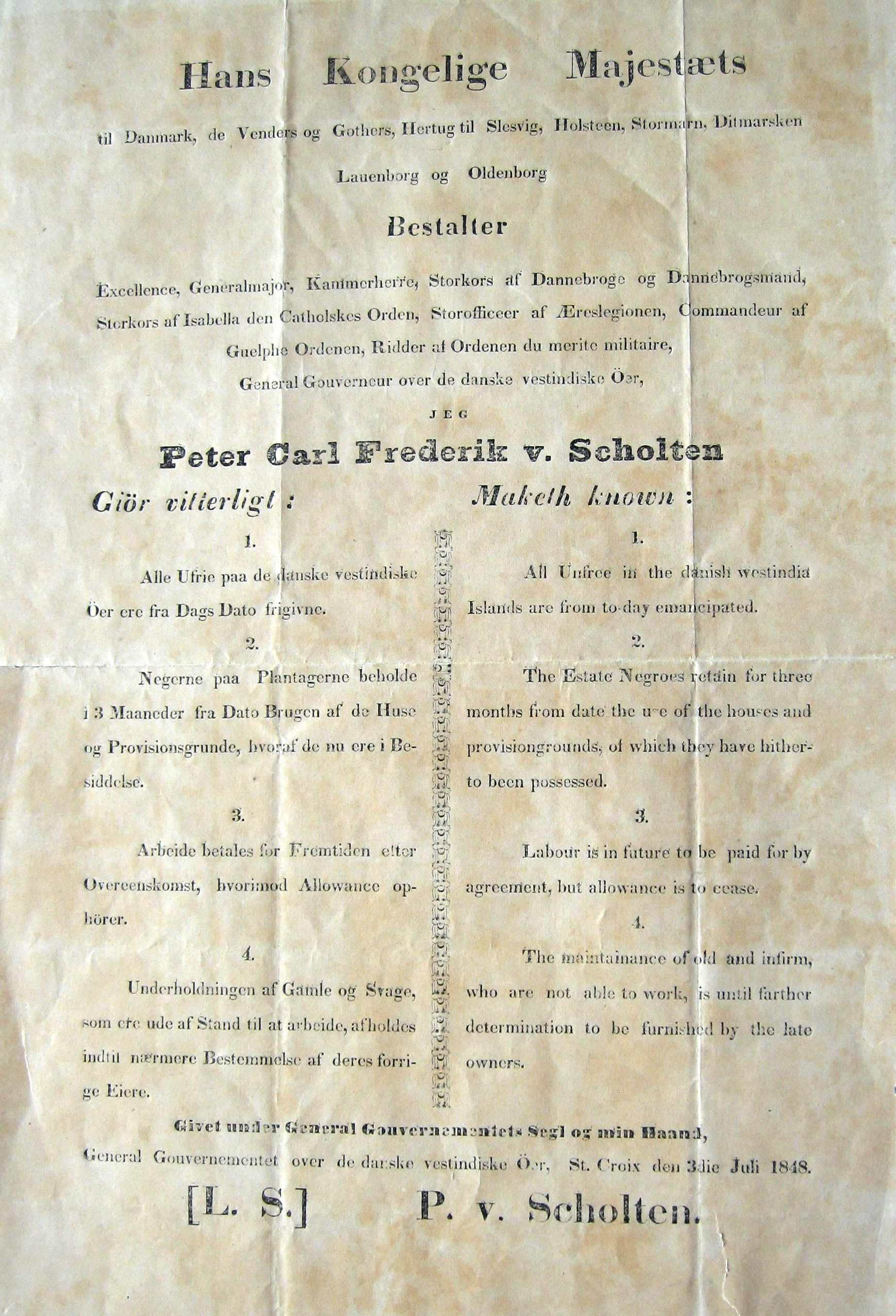
Emancipation proclamation, 1848

By the 1830s and 1840s, the sugar beet industry had reduced the profitability of sugarcane. The passing of the British Slavery Abolition Act in 1833 emancipated slaves in the neighboring British West Indies, to be fully effective as of 1840. Consequently, abolition in the Danish West Indies was discussed. The governor, Peter von Scholten, who had been seeking reforms since 1830, was in favor of emancipation. Scholarly consensus suggests von Scholten's views were influenced by his free-colored mistress Anna Heegaard.

King Christian VIII supported the gradual abolition of slavery and ruled in 1847 that every child born of an unfree woman should be free from birth, and that slavery would end entirely after 12 years. That ruling satisfied neither the slaves nor the plantation owners.

Meanwhile, on 27 April 1848, France passed a law to abolish slavery in its colonies within two months, but a slave insurrection on Martinique led to immediate abolition there on 22 May, and on Guadeloupe on 27 May.

The slaves in the Danish West Indies did not want to wait for their freedom either. On 2 July 1848, freedman John Gottlieb (also known as "Moses Gottlieb" or "General Buddhoe") and Admiral Martin King, among others, led a slave rebellion, taking over Frederiksted, Saint Croix. That evening, hundreds of slaves gathered peaceably outside Fort Frederik refusing to work the next day and demanding freedom. By 10 a.m. the following morning, about 8,000 slaves had joined.

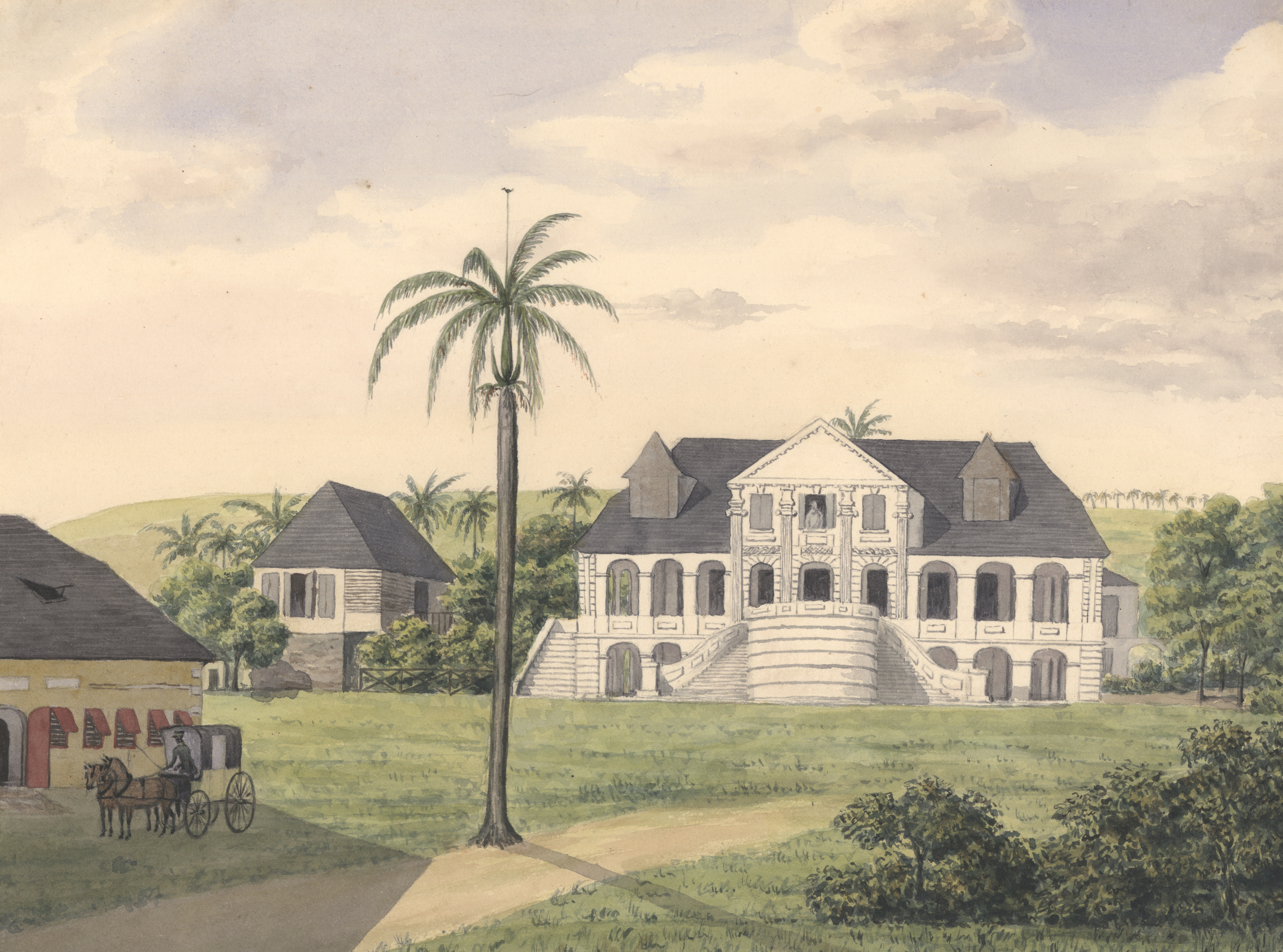
The Høgensborg estate on Sankt Croix, 1833

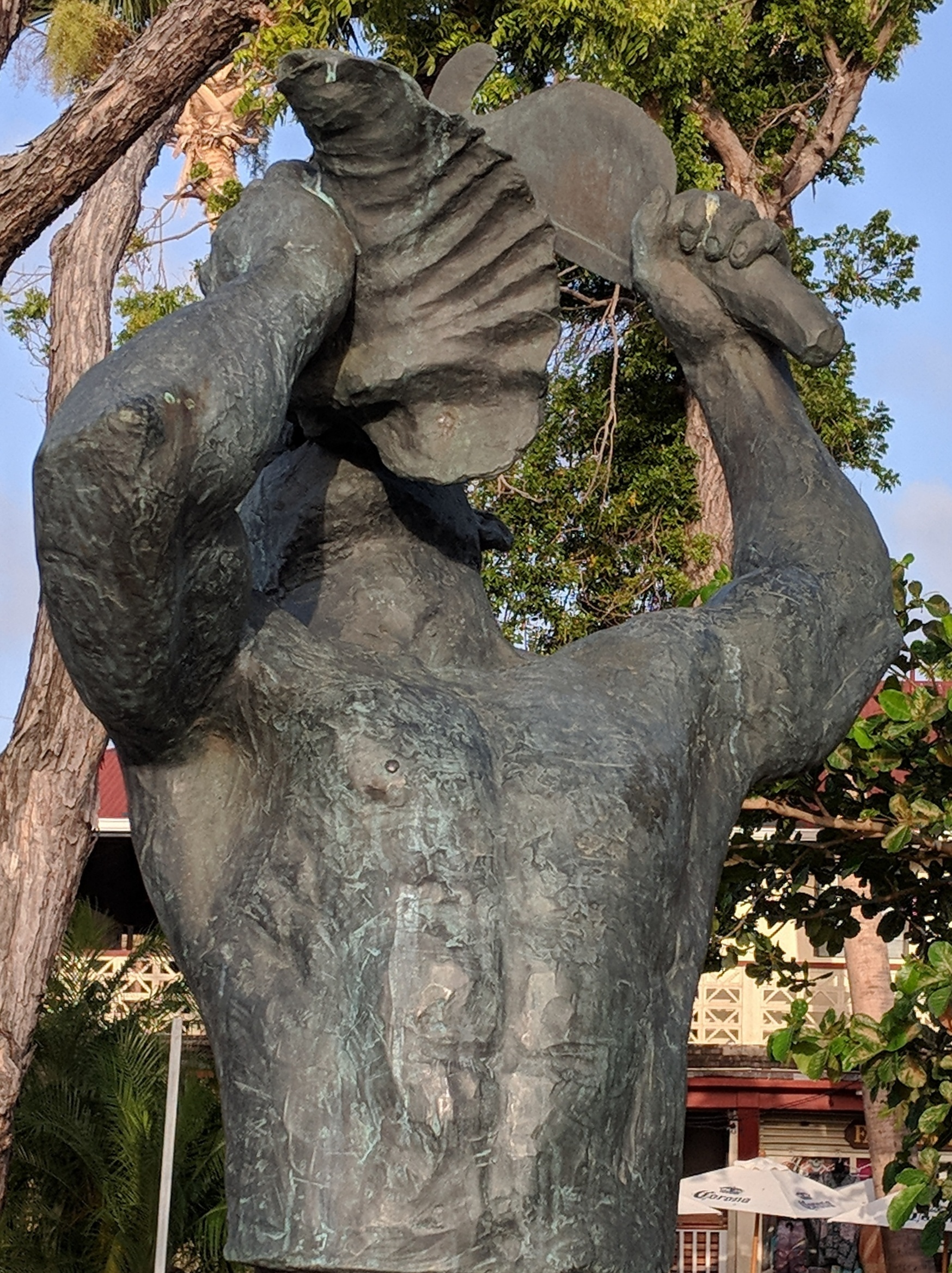
The conch blower in the "Freedom Statue" depicts the slaves' call to action in 1848

On the afternoon of 3 July 1848 (now known as Emancipation Day), Peter van Scholten went to Frederiksted. To end the rebellion and prevent further bloodshed and damage, he announced an immediate and total emancipation of all slaves. He then went to Christiansted, where a second rebellion had formed and some fires had been set, and had notices proclaiming emancipation disseminated to the other islands. General Buddhoe worked with the governor and other officials to end the riots and violence that had broken out on a few estates.

In the aftermath, Buddhoe is said to have been jailed and exiled to Trinidad. Governor von Scholten also fared poorly. As governor, he did not have the authority to end slavery, but had found himself in a situation where he needed to take immediate action that could not be delayed while he communicated with Denmark. For his actions, he was called back to Denmark to face a trial for treason. At first, he was denied his pension, but was later cleared of the charges.

When Denmark abolished slavery in 1848, many plantation owners wanted full reimbursement on the grounds that their assets were damaged by the loss of the slaves, and by the fact that they would have to pay for labor in the future. The Danish government paid plantation owners fifty dollars compensation for every slave they had owned and recognized that the slaves' release had caused a financial loss for the owners.

=== Post-slavery ===
The lives of the formerly enslaved people changed very little because many continued to be bound to the plantation system through contractual servitude. Most were bound to serve the plantations where they had previously been enslaved. As employees, former slaves were not the plantation owners' responsibility and did not receive food or care from their employers. As part of a sharecropping system, some formerly enslaved people received a small hut, a little land, and some money; however, this one-time compensation did not change the harsh working conditions.

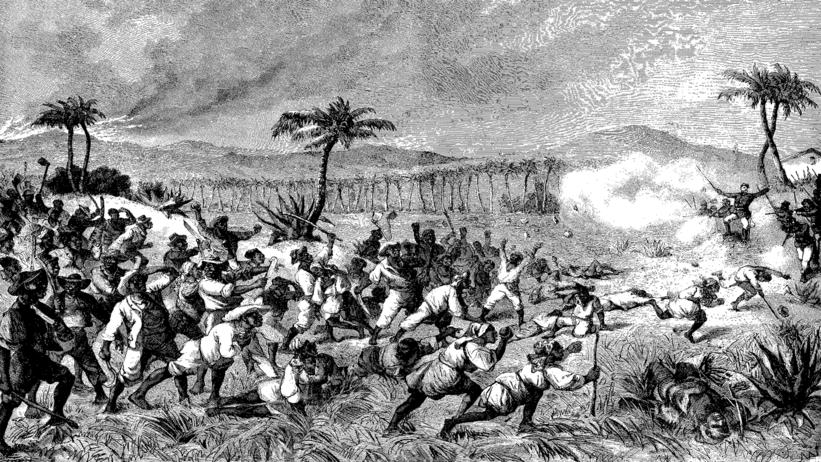
The Fireburn labor riot in 1878

The Fireburn labor riot, considered to be the largest labor revolt in Danish colonial history, took place on 1 October 1878. The revolt began because the formerly enslaved continued to live and work in slave-like conditions even though three decades had passed since the abolition of slavery. Mary Leticia Thomas, today referred to as Queen Mary of St. Croix, spearheaded the revolt alongside three other women: Axeline ‘Agnes’ Elizabeth Salomon, Matilde McBean and Susanna ‘Bottom Belly’ Abrahamsson. The Fireburn uprising and its leaders continue to have a meaningful role in St. Croix.

Racist cartoon by Alfred Schmidt published in the Danish magazine Klods-Hans in January 1917 about the treaty of the Danish West Indies. It depicts Woodrow Wilson as having "adopted" the three islands of St. Thomas, St. John and St. Croix (depicted as pickaninnies) from Denmark.

The USA purchased the Danish West Indies in 1917. 2017 marked the 100th anniversary of the sale of the colony by Denmark to the United States. With this centennial, conversations on the legacy of Danish–Norwegian colonization and slavery were reignited in the Scandinavian mainstream. For example, the artists Jeannette Ehlers and La Vaughn Belle unveiled Denmark's first statue of a black woman, I Am Queen Mary, to memorialize Denmark's colonial impact.

== Currency used in the Danish West Indies, 1672–1917 ==
=== 1767 ===
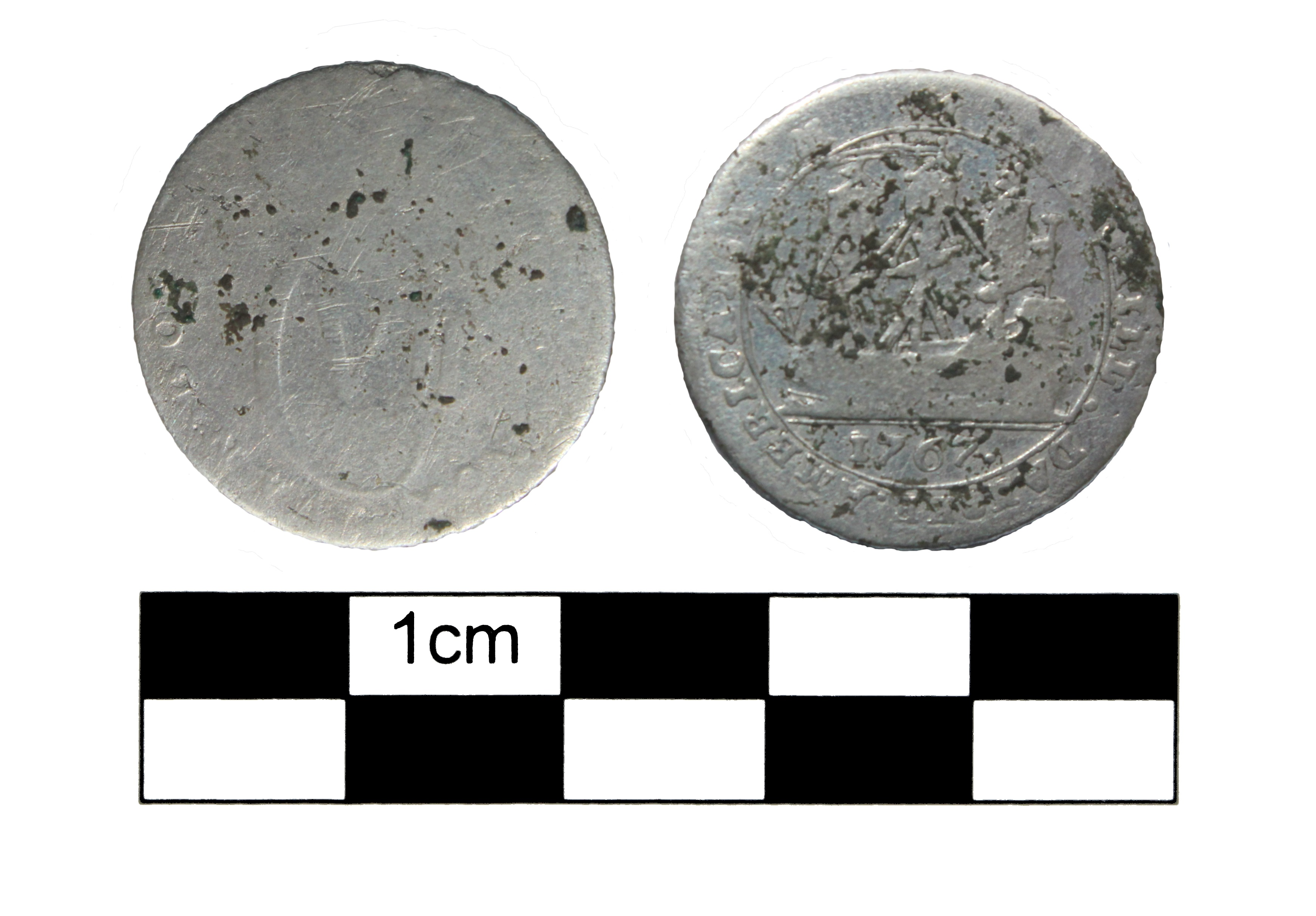
Coins 1767.

=== 1773 ===
The Danes overstruck Spanish coins, issued by Charles III. However, the used stroke is of Christian VI (1730– 1746) and not of Christian VII (1766–1808). Bearing witness to the difficulty not only of producing or procuring flans, but also even just obtaining new striking tools.

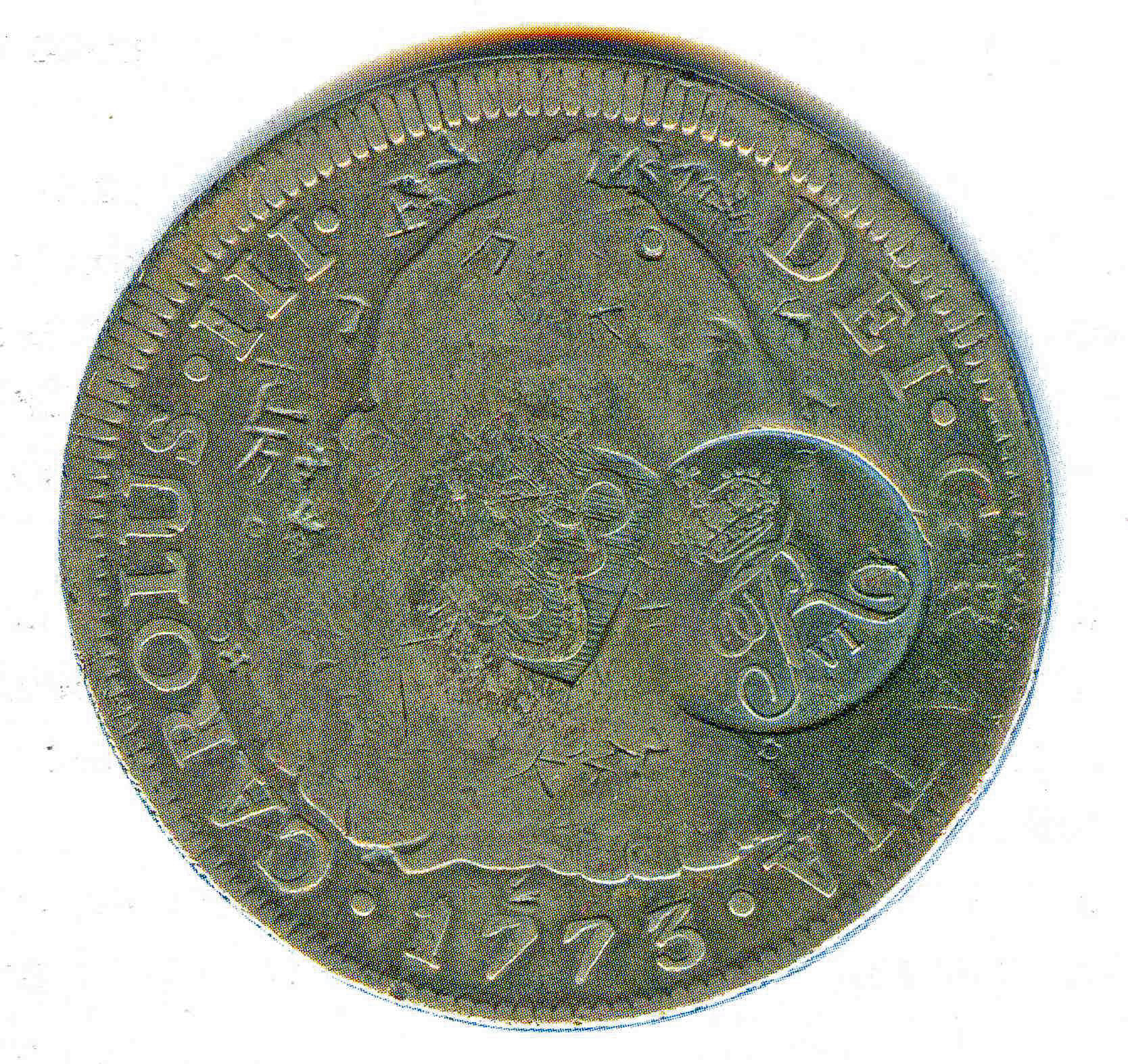
Overstruck coin from 1773.

=== 1837 ===
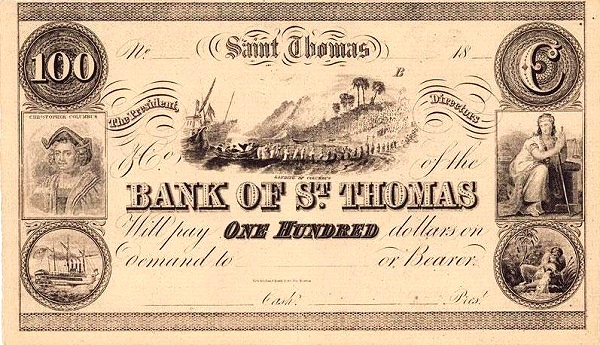
100 Dollars - Bank of St. Thomas (1837).

=== 1849 ===
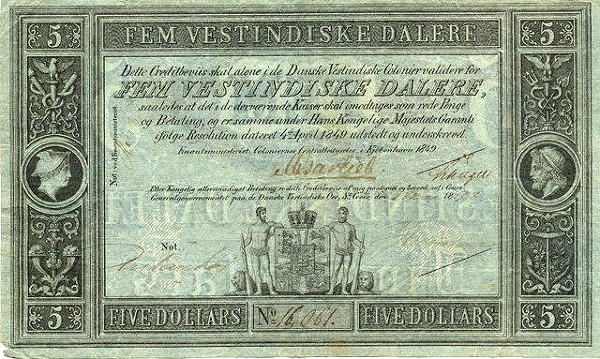
5 Westindiske Dalere - State Treasury (1849).

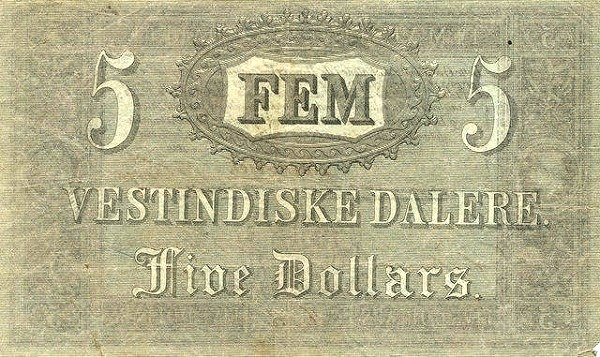
5 Westindiske Dalere - State Treasury (1849).

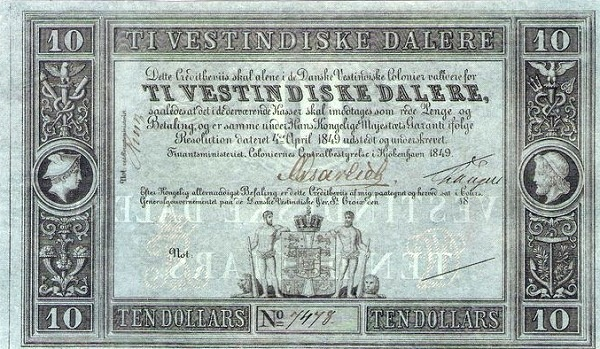
10 Westindiske Dalere - State Treasury (1849).

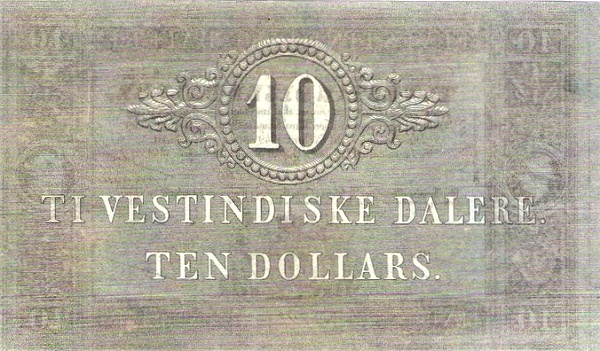
10 Westindiske Dalere - State Treasury (1849).

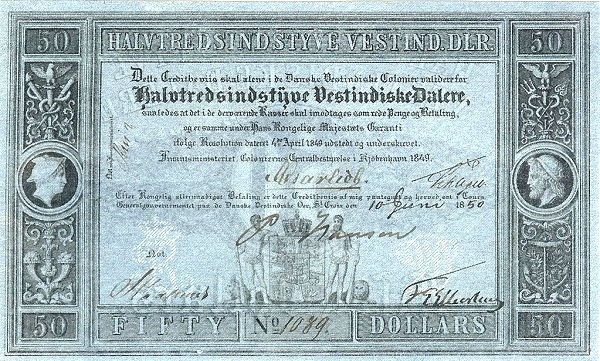
50 Westindiske Dalere - State Treasury (1849).

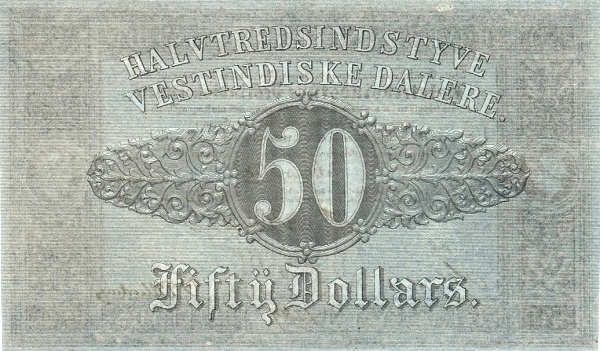
50 Westindiske Dalere - State Treasury (1849).

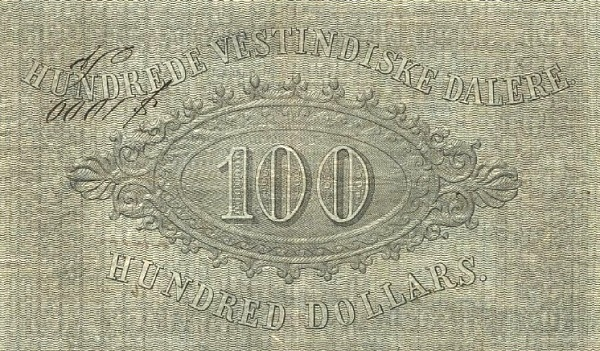
100 Westindiske Dalere - State Treasury (1849).

=== 1878 ===
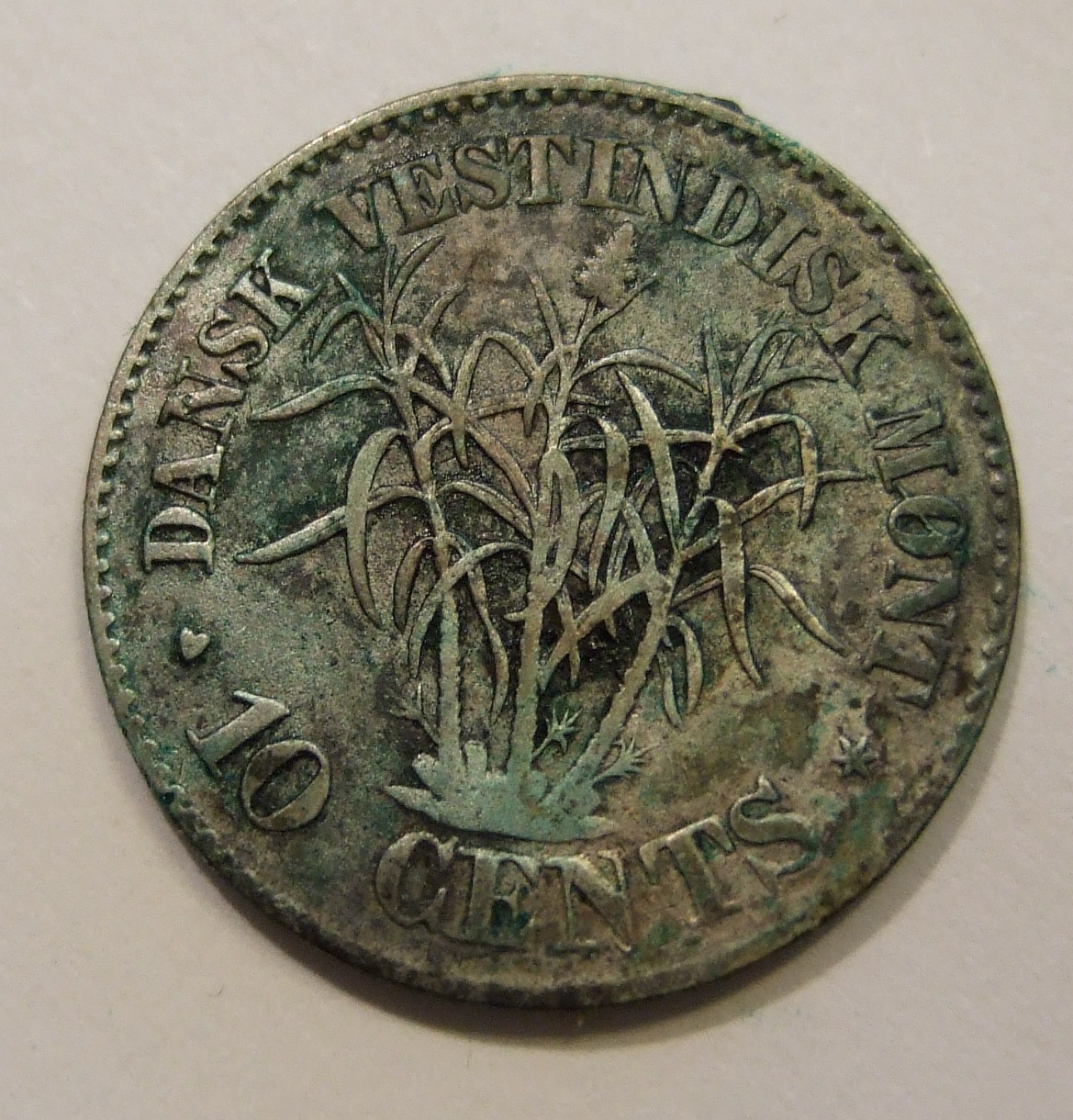
Danish West Indies Virgin Islands Christian IX 1878 10 Cents.

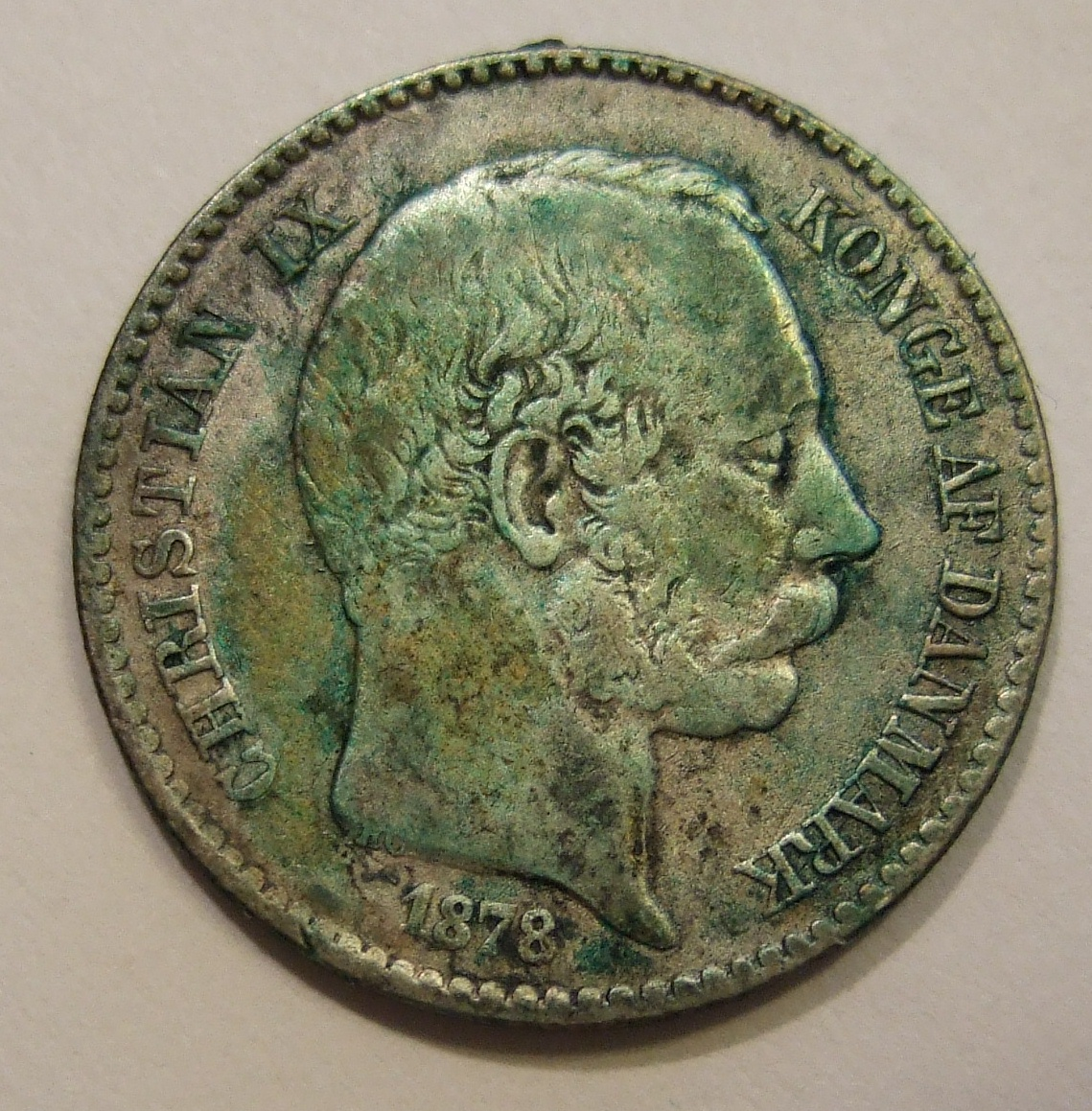
Danish West Indies Virgin Islands Christian IX 1878 10 Cents.

=== 1889 ===
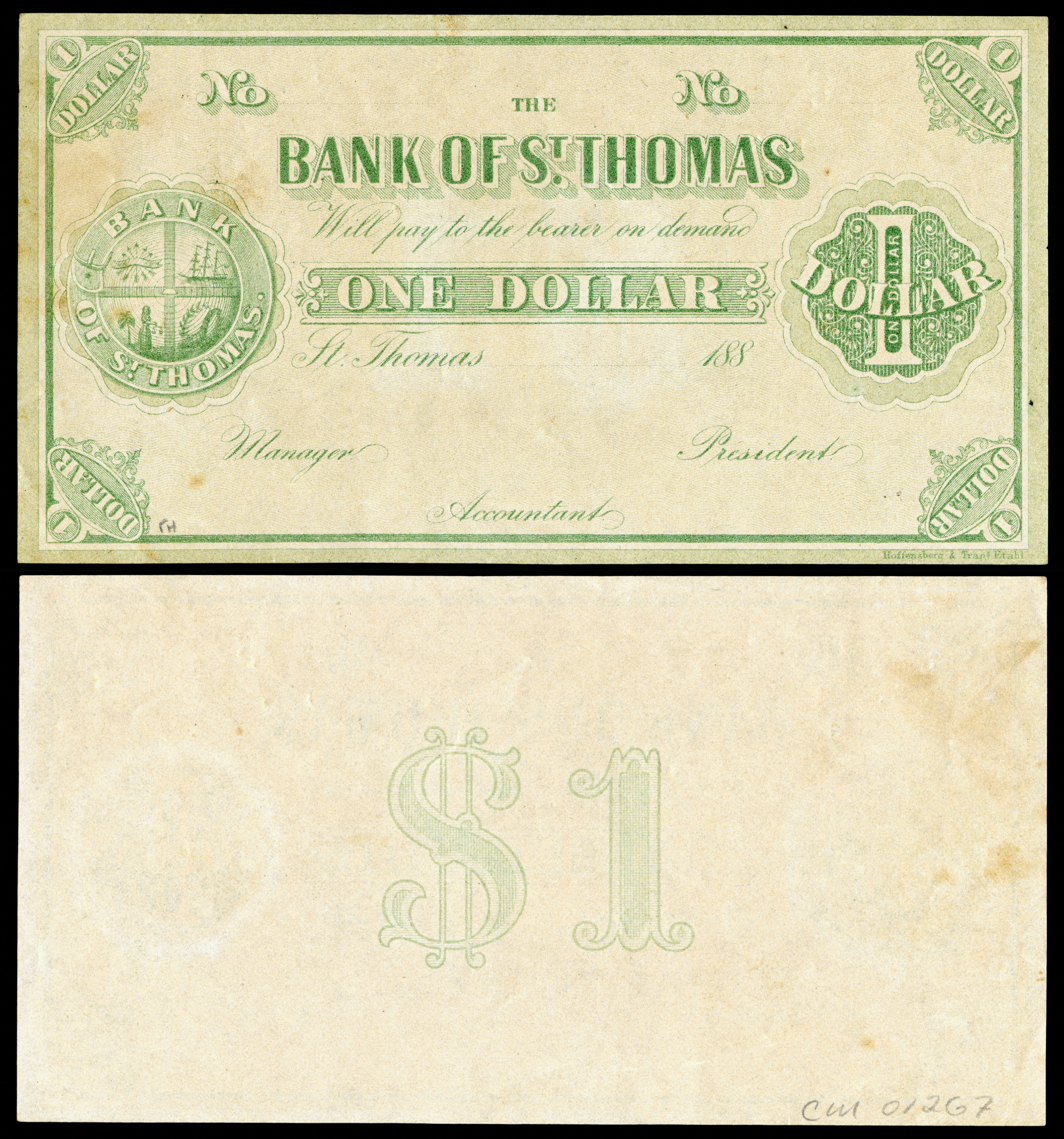
DWI-15r-Danish West Indies (St Thomas)-1 Dollar (1889).

=== 1898 ===
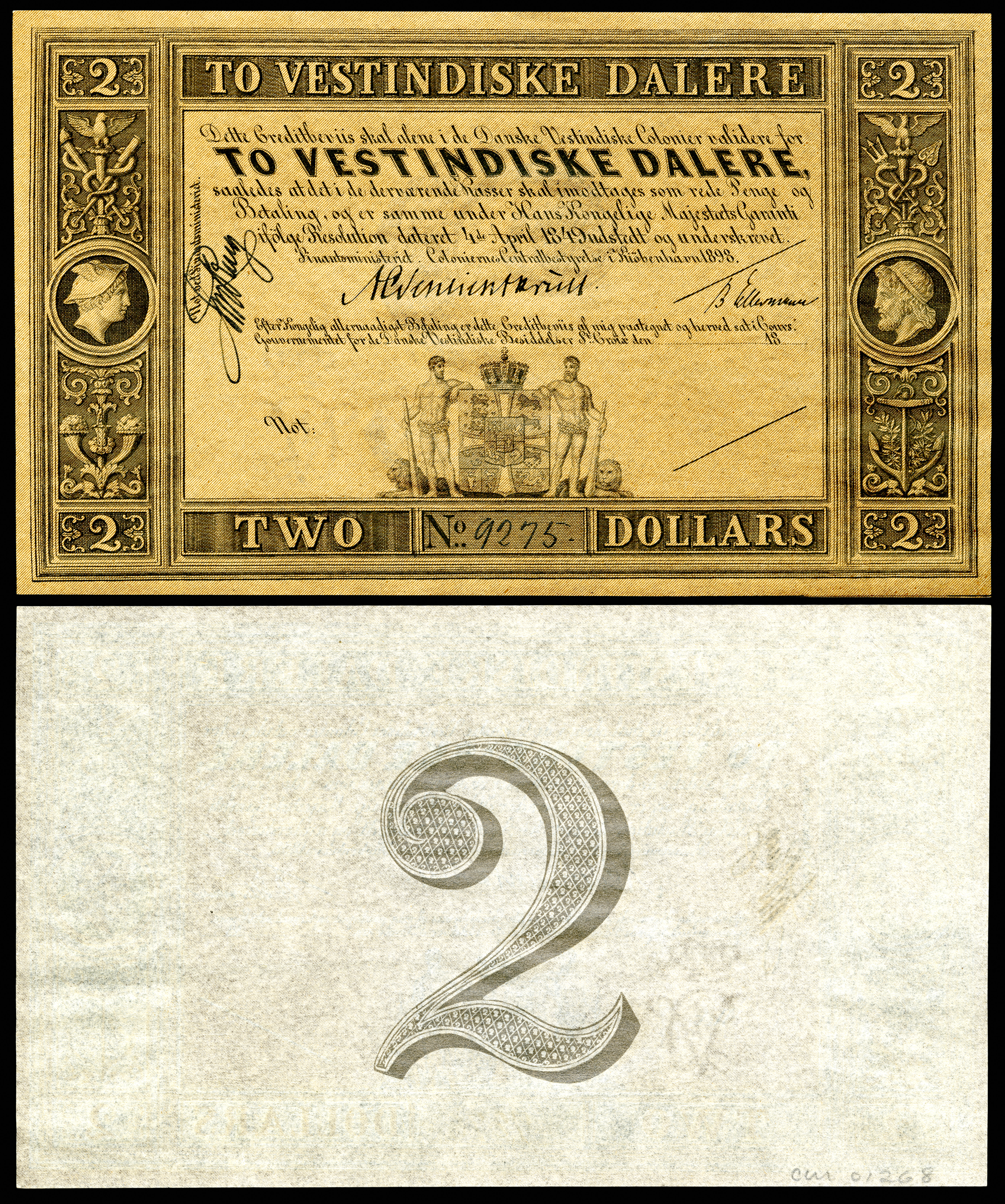
DWI-8r-Danish West Indies (St. Croix)-2 Dalere (1898). Two-daler banknote from Saint Croix in the Danish West Indies (1898).

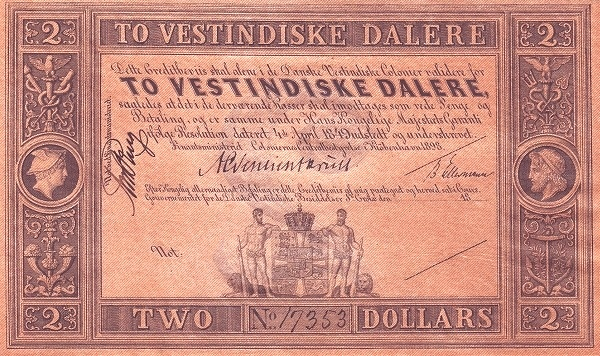
2 Westindiske Dalere - State Treasury (1898).

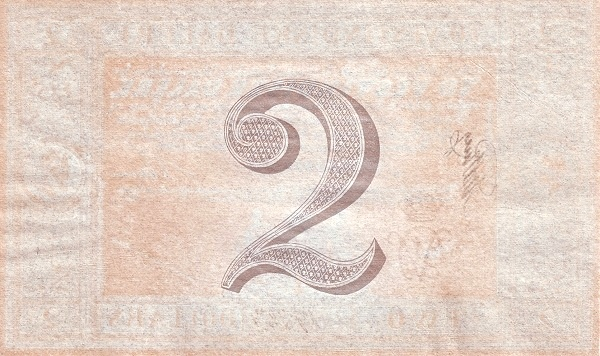
2 Westindiske Dalere - State Treasury (1898).

=== 1904 ===
Danish West Indian daler

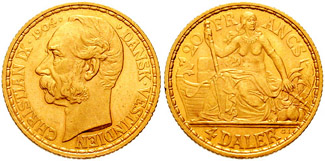
20 Francs, Danish West Indies 4 daler.

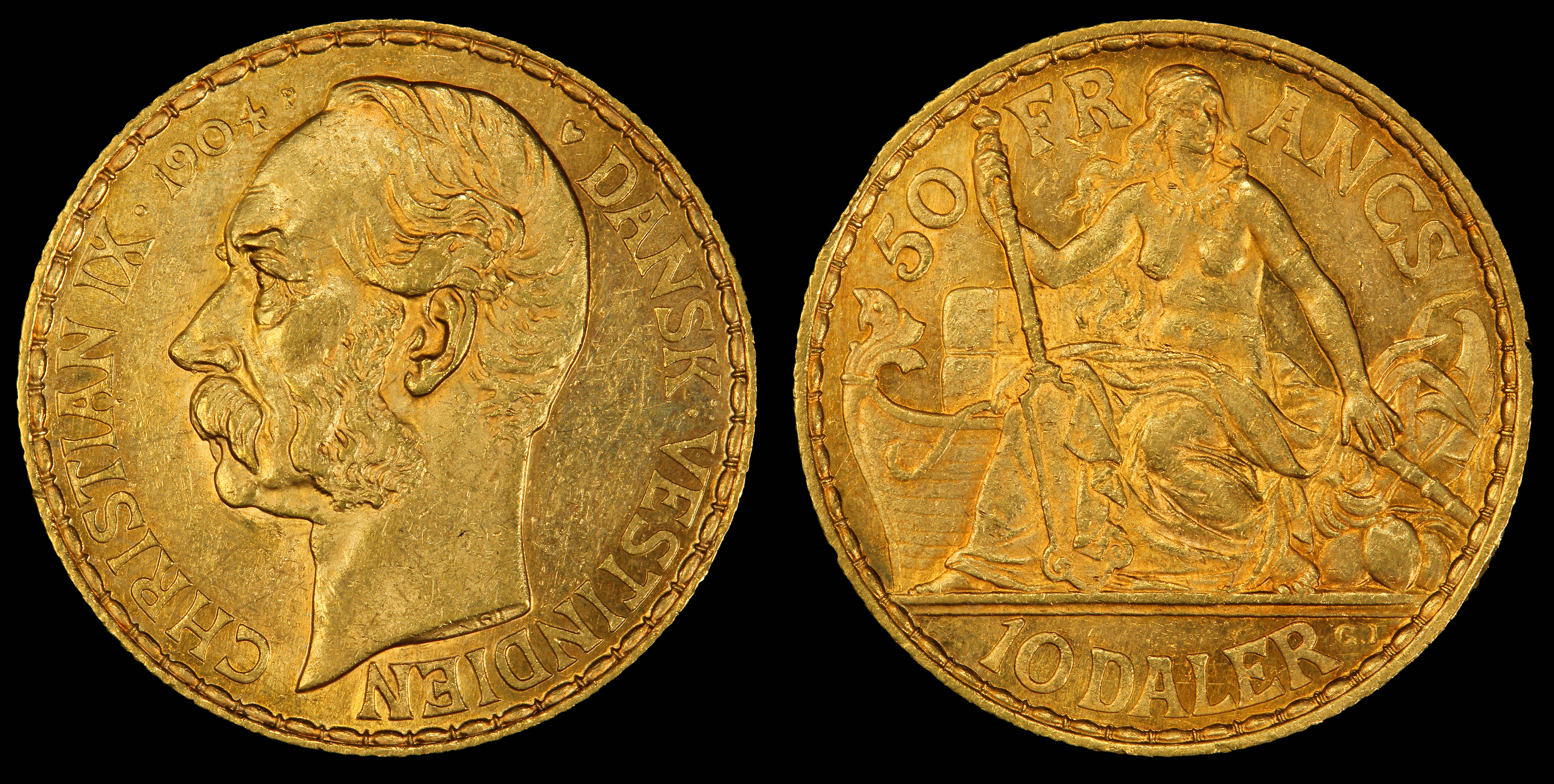
50 Francs, Danish West Indies 1904 10 Daler.

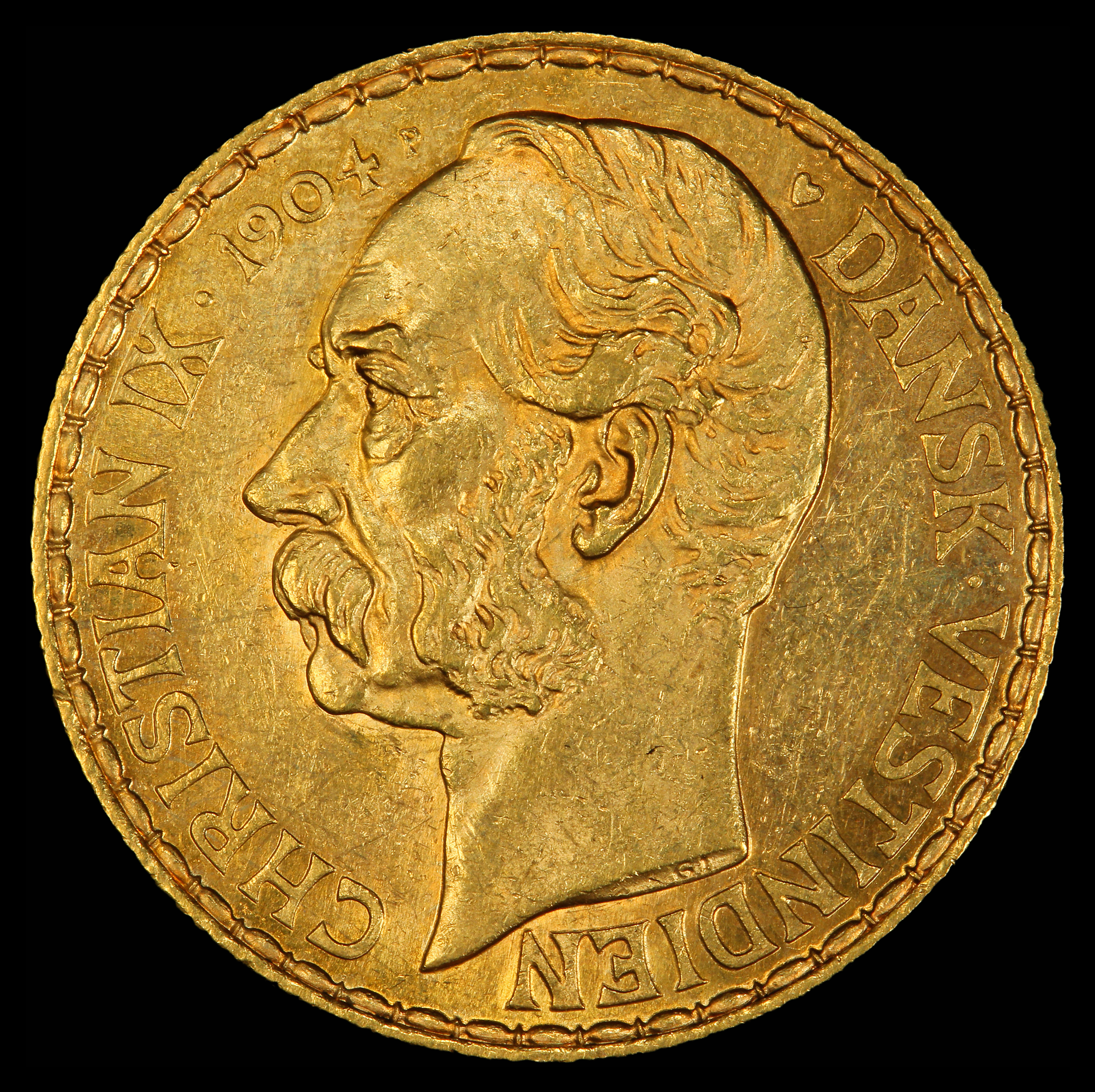
50 Francs, Danish West Indies 1904 10 Daler (obv).

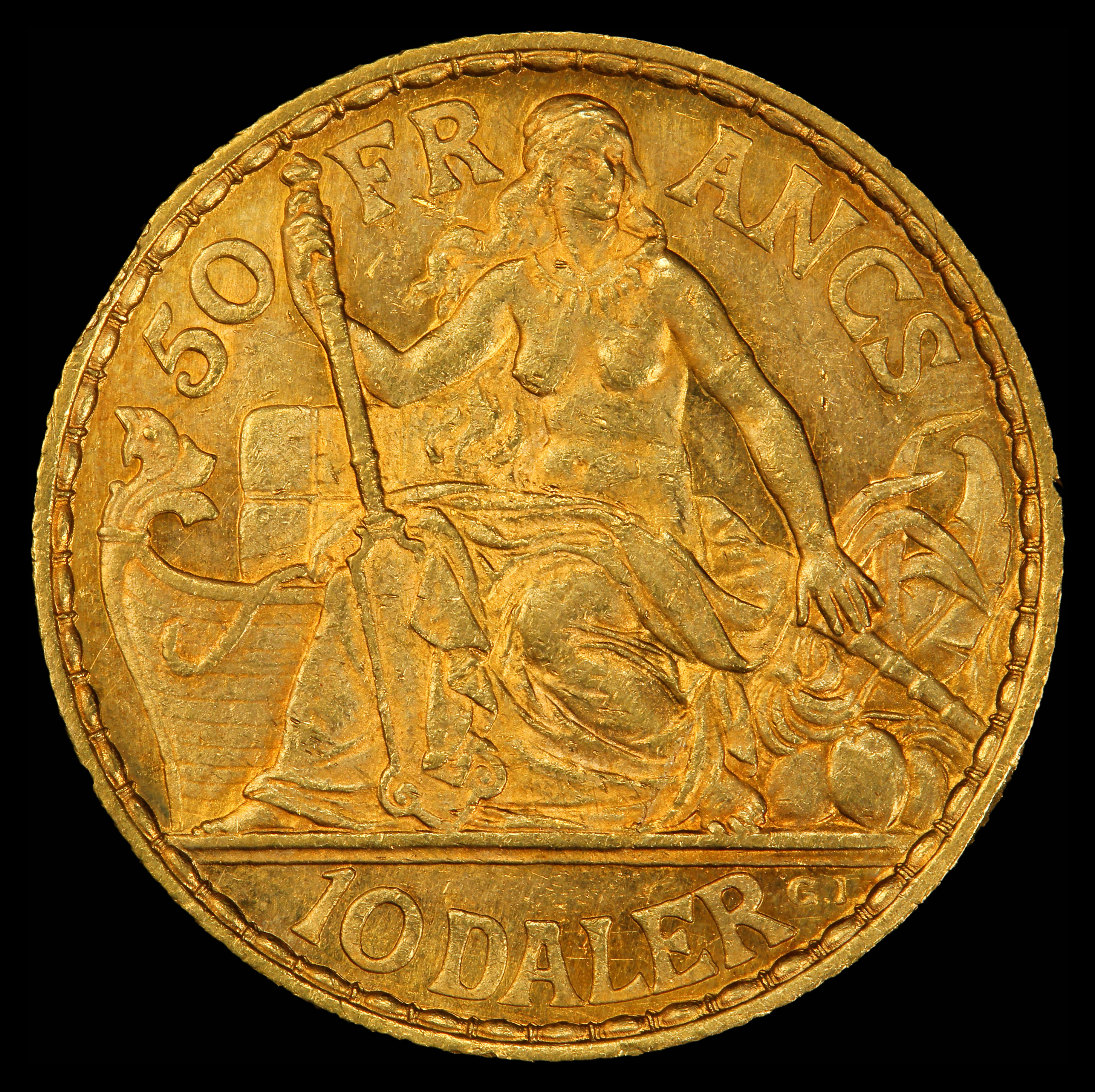
50 Francs, Danish West Indies 1904 10 Daler (rev).

=== 1905 ===
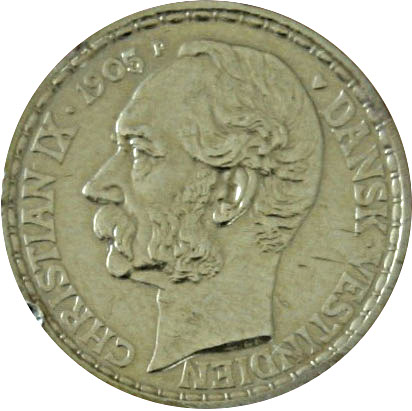
Christian IX Denmark Westindien 1905.

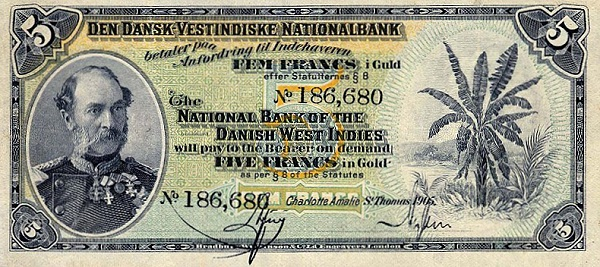
5 Francs in Gold - Dansk-Vestindiske Nationalbank (1905).

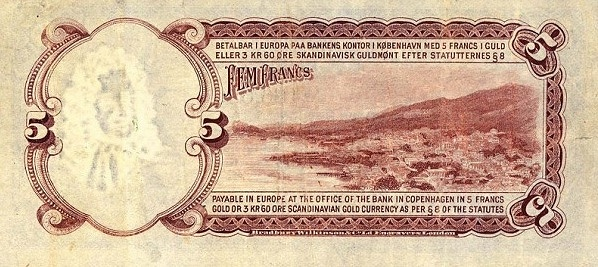
5 Francs in Gold - Dansk-Vestindiske Nationalbank (1905).

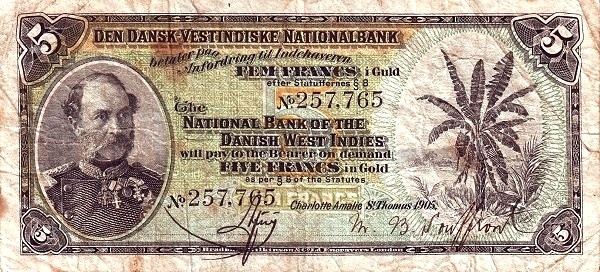
Francs in Gold - Dansk-Vestindiske Nationalbank (1905).

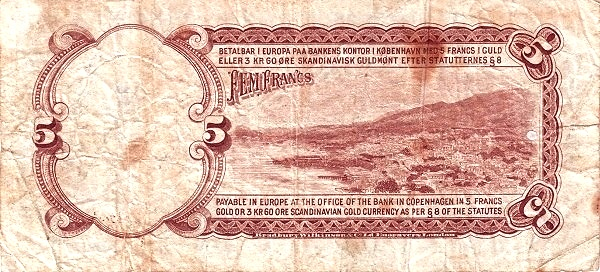
5 Francs in Gold - Dansk-Vestindiske Nationalbank (1905).

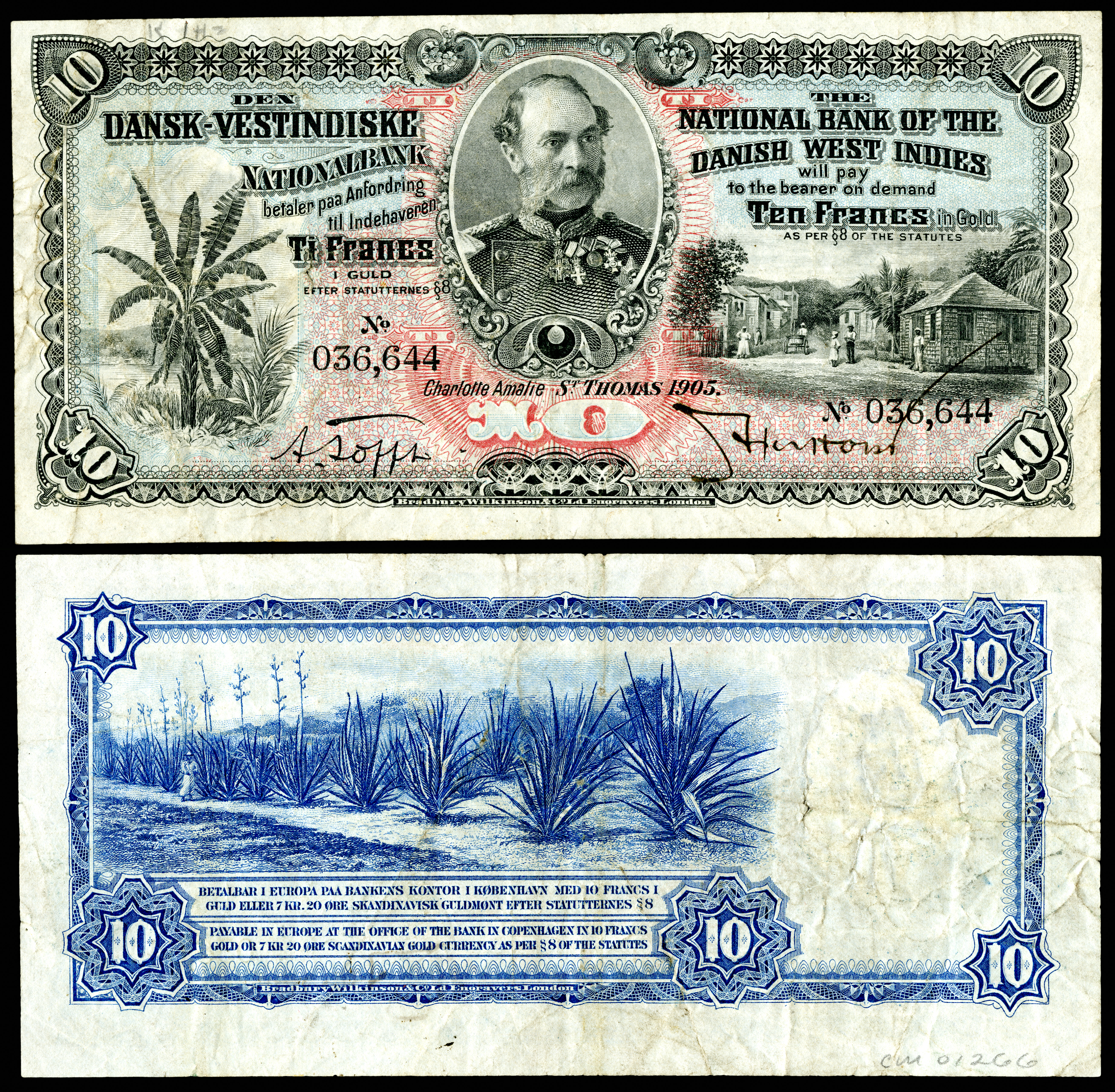
DWI-18-Danish West Indies (St Thomas)-10 Francs (1905).

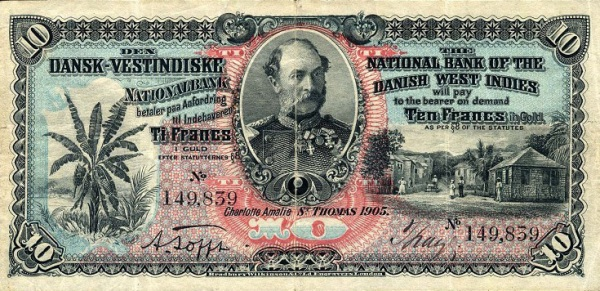
10 Francs in Gold - Dansk-Vestindiske Nationalbank (1905).

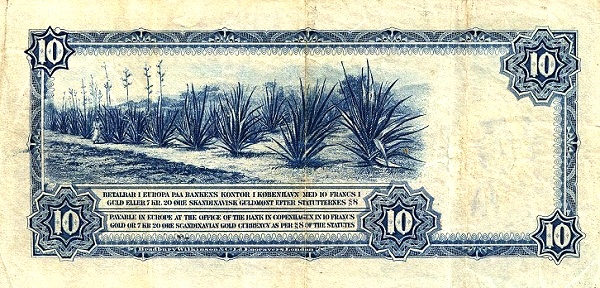
10 Francs in Gold - Dansk-Vestindiske Nationalbank (1905).

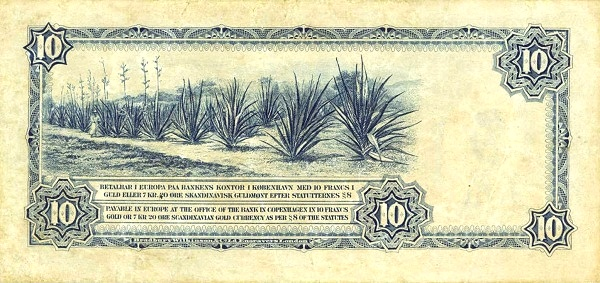
10 Francs in Gold - Dansk-Vestindiske Nationalbank (1905).

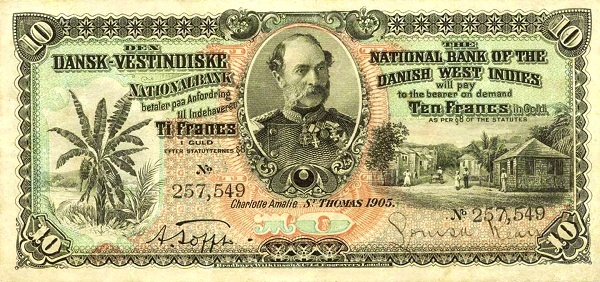
10 Francs in Gold - Dansk-Vestindiske Nationalbank (1905).

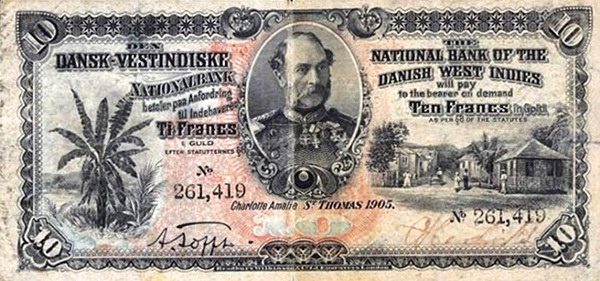
10 Francs in Gold - Dansk-Vestindiske Nationalbank (1905).

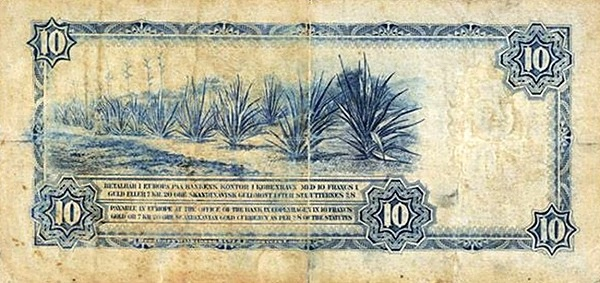
10 Francs in Gold - Dansk-Vestindiske Nationalbank (1905).

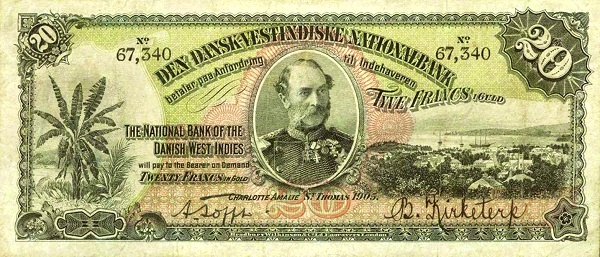
20 Francs in Gold - Dansk-Vestindiske Nationalbank (1905).

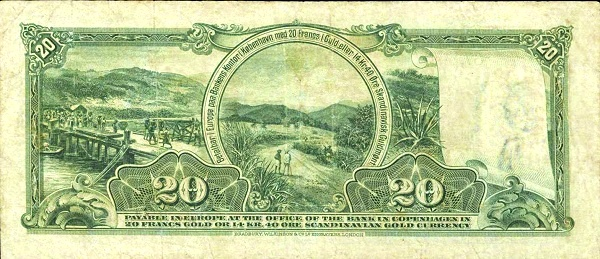
20 Francs in Gold - Dansk-Vestindiske Nationalbank (1905).

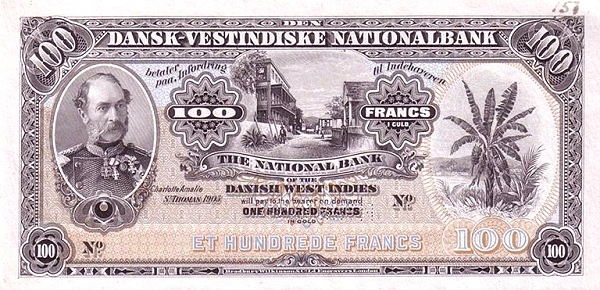
100 Francs in Gold - Dansk-Vestindiske Nationalbank (1905).

== See also ==
- Kingdom of Denmark
  - Denmark
  - Greenland
  - Faroe Islands
- List of governors of the Danish West Indies
- 1868 Danish West Indies status referendum
- 1916 Danish West Indies status referendum
- 1916 Danish West Indian Islands sale referendum
- Danish Asiatic Company
- Danish India
- Danish Gold Coast
- Danish slave trade
- Estate Rust Op Twist
- Flag of Denmark
- List of Danish flags
- List of territory purchased by a sovereign nation from another sovereign nation
