= Green Kay, U.S. Virgin Islands =

Green Kay, United States Virgin Islands
- Village
- Location within Saint Croix, U.S. Virgin Islands Location within the U.S. Virgin Islands
- Coordinates: 17°45′31″N 64°39′15″W
- Country: United States Virgin Islands
- Island: Saint Croix
- Time zone: UTC-4 (AST)

Green Kay is a settlement on the island of Saint Croix in the United States Virgin Islands. It is located 3.3 miles (5.3 km) east of Christiansted.

The settlement was established as a sugar cane plantation in 1754. The plantation, which used slave labor, was owned by Peter Heyliger, Sr., and his son and survived into the 19th century. The plantation's factory, mill, and bell tower still survive. The decaying factory is representative of the T-shaped factory buildings used on plantations of the era in the Virgin Islands, while the mill and bell tower are well-preserved 19th-century buildings. The three buildings were added to the National Register of Historic Places on July 19, 1976.

East Hill

A portion of the property south across the public road was purchased by the Danish government and used for a schoolhouse a home to house and a farm to support a schoolmaster. This property is sometimes referred to as Estate East Hill.
