= Treaty of the Danish West Indies =

1916 treaty in which the U.S. purchased the Virgin Islands from Denmark

Convention between the United States and Denmark for cession of the Danish West Indies
- Signed: 4 August 1916
- Location: New York
- Signatories: Denmark; United States
- Citations: 39 Stat. 1706; TS 629; 7 Bevans 56
- Languages: English, Danish

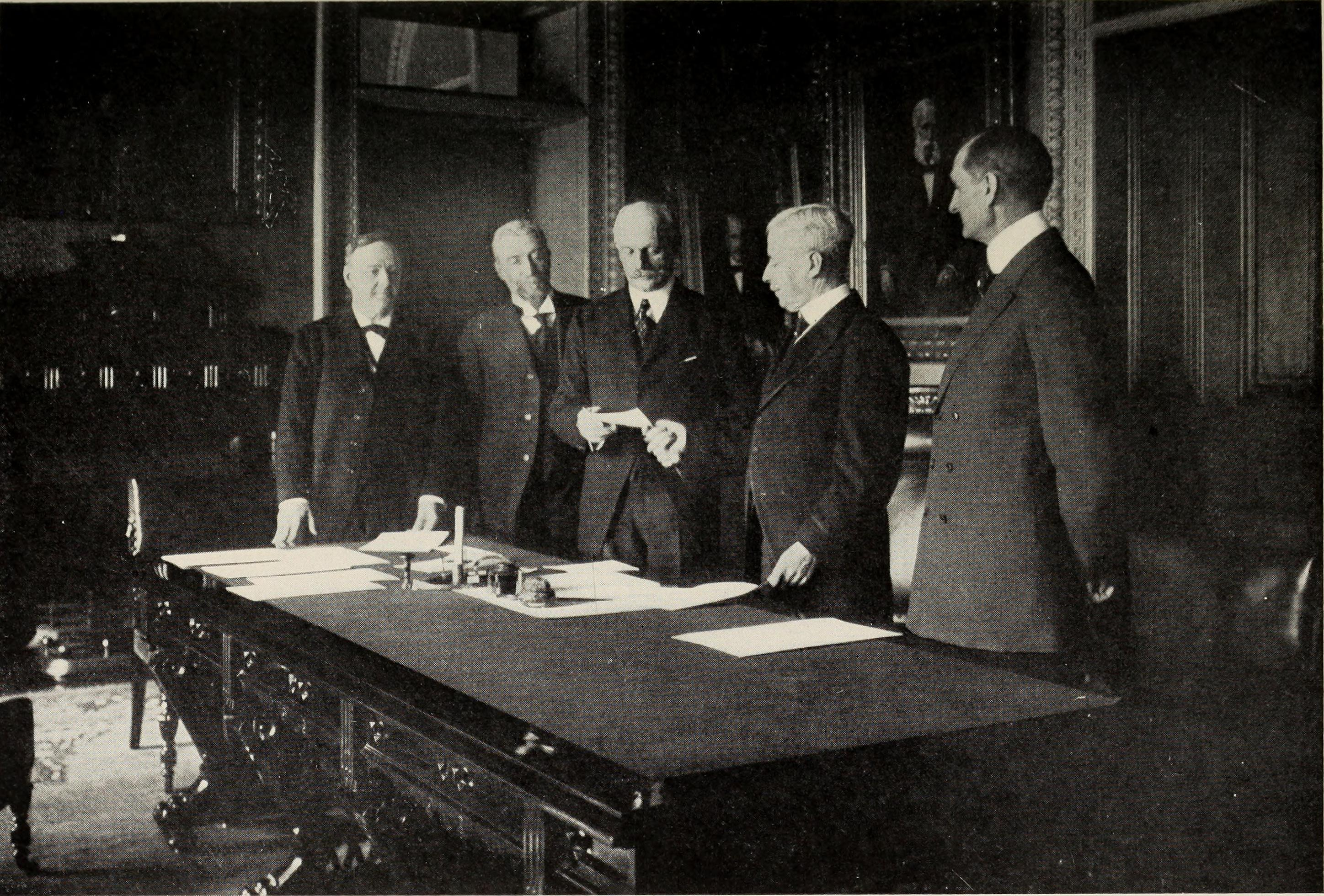
1917 money transfer after the Treaty of the Danish West Indies

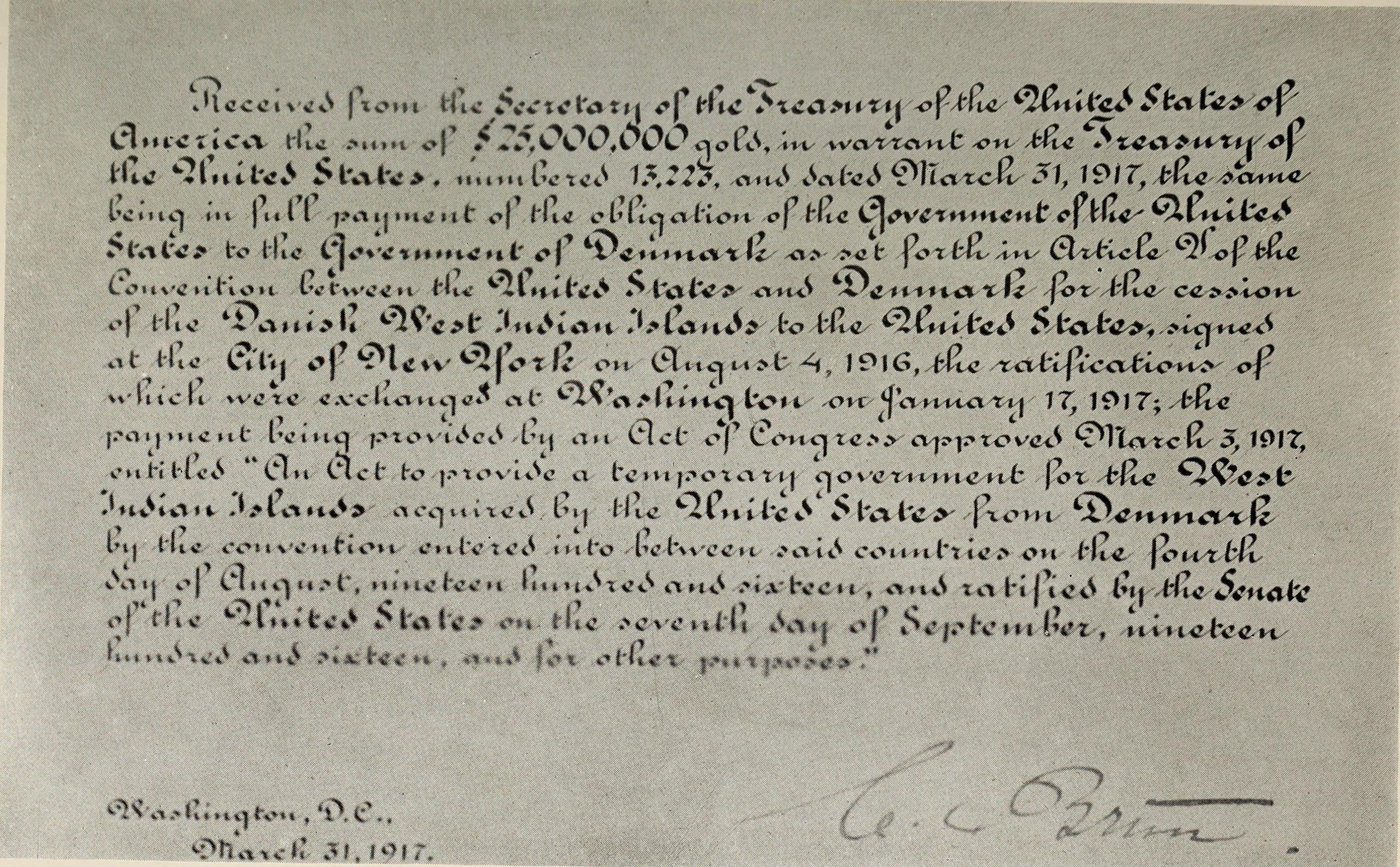
$25,000,000 receipt for the Treaty of the Danish West Indies

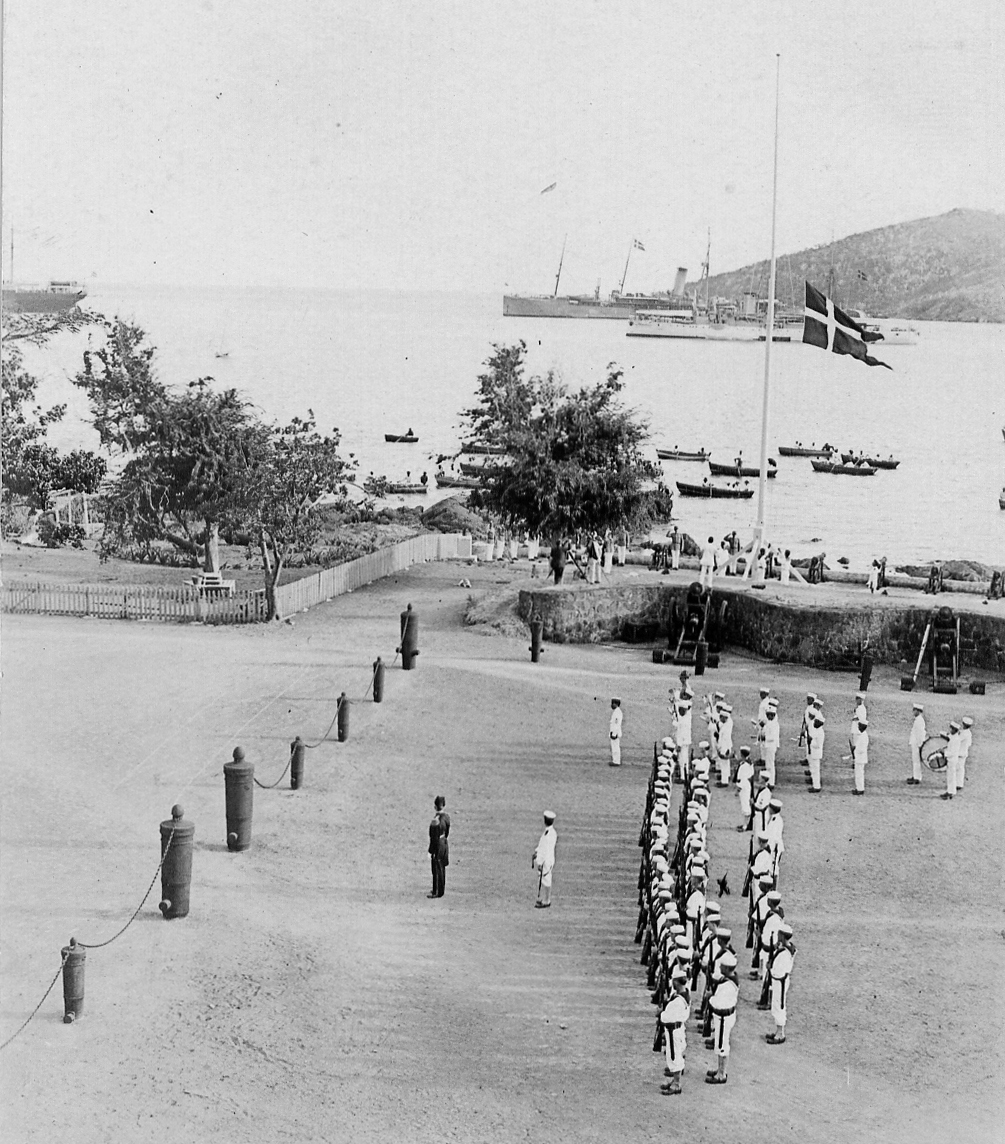
31 March 1917, after 251 years of Danish colonial rule, the Dannebrog is lowered for the last time at the Governor's mansion at Saint Croix

The Treaty of the Danish West Indies (Danish: Vestindiens traktat), officially the Convention between the United States and Denmark for cession of the Danish West Indies (Danish: Konventionen mellem USA og Danmark), was a 1916 treaty transferring sovereignty of the Danish West Indies from Denmark to the United States in exchange for a sum of US$25,000,000 in gold ($740 million in 2025), and agreement to cede US interest in Greenland. It is one of the most recent permanent expansions of territory under United States sovereignty. (Note: The most recent expansion of United States territory was when the Northern Mariana Islands came under U.S. sovereignty in November 1986.)

== History ==
=== Background ===
Two of the islands had been in Danish possession since the 17th century and St. Croix since 1733. The glory days of the colony had been from around 1750 to 1850, based on transit trade and the production of rum and sugar using African slaves as labour. By the second half of the 19th century, the sugar production was embattled by the cultivation of sugar beets, and although the slaves had been emancipated in 1848, the agricultural land and the trade was still controlled by the white population, and the living conditions of the descendants of the slaves were poor. By the early 1850s the islands had become increasingly unprofitable and expensive to govern from Denmark.

At the negotiations for the Treaty of Vienna after the defeat in the Second Schleswig War in 1864, Denmark had offered to trade the islands for South Jutland (Schleswig), but the Prussian Government was not interested.

On the eve of the American Civil War, the United States became interested in the islands as the possible location of a Caribbean naval base. After the war ended, on 24 October 1867, the Danish parliament, the Rigsdag, ratified a treaty on the sale of two of the islands—St. Thomas and St. John—for a sum of US$7,500,000. However, the United States Senate did not ratify the treaty due to concerns over a number of natural disasters that had struck the islands and a political feud with President Andrew Johnson that eventually led to his impeachment.

Negotiations resumed in 1899 following the unofficial diplomacy of Walter Christmas. On 24 January 1902, Washington signed a convention on the transfer of the islands for a sum of US$5,000,000. The treaty was not approved in the Landstinget, one chamber of the Danish legislature, within the allotted time due to obstruction by the opposition. A new treaty was concluded in June 1902, extending the time limit of ratification by one year. One chamber of the Danish parliament—the Folketinget—passed the proposal, but in the other chamber—the Landstinget—it failed with 32 votes against 32 (with one abstention) on 22 October. In particular, the conservative party, Højre, opposed it on the grounds that the treaty did not ensure the local population a vote on the matter, and that it did not grant them US citizenship or freedom from customs duty on the export of sugar to the United States. According to historian Povl Engelstoft, there is no doubt that the Council President, Johan Henrik Deuntzer, was privately against the sale even though his party, the Venstre Reform Party, supported it, and when the Landstinget failed to pass the proposal, he made a statement that neither did he see a reason for the cabinet to step down, nor would he dissolve the Landstinget or assume responsibility for any further work related to the sale. This brought the process to a halt.

Another attempt to acquire the islands was made by the U.S. in 1911-12, but ended in failure.

=== Opening of 1915–16 negotiations ===
D. Hamilton Jackson, a labour union leader and social activist in the islands, visited Denmark in May 1915. He spoke to Danish leaders about the growing social desperation on the islands and the need to enter the customs territory of the United States for economic survival. After his visit, a majority of the Folketinget was convinced that the Danish supremacy of the islands had to end. World War I had created a new situation: the relations between Germany and the United States were becoming worse as a consequence of Germany's unrestricted submarine warfare, and the Americans were concerned that, after an invasion of Denmark, Germany might take control of the islands. This would be unacceptable to the Americans as stated in the Monroe Doctrine.

The Danish government was convinced that the islands had to be sold for the sake of both the residents and Danish security, and that a transfer would have to be realised before the United States entered the war, so that the transfer would not become a violation of Danish neutrality. During May 1915, Erik Scavenius, the Foreign Minister of Denmark, contacted the U.S. government with the message that he believed that the islands ought to be sold to the United States and that although he would not make an official proposal, "if the United States gave any encouragement to the consideration of the possibility of such a sale, it might be possible."

After the sinking of the Lusitania in 1915, the naval security of the United States became a priority. The acquisition of the islands was discussed by outgoing Secretary of State William Jennings Bryan, President Woodrow Wilson, and then-Secretary ad interim Robert Lansing. In August 1915, the American minister at Copenhagen reported that the Danes would favor a sale if the US would not "propose pecuniary terms which would lead to haggling," a cause of the failure of the 1902 negotiations.

On 29 October 1915, Robert Lansing, now the United States Secretary of State, managed to reopen the negotiations, although the Danes claimed reluctance on the basis that their commercial interests in the region had been rendered more valuable by the recent construction of the Panama Canal. The negotiations, which lasted until August 1916, were kept absolutely secret in order to maintain Danish neutrality. Although rumours of the future sale did leak to the press, they were denied categorically by both Scavenius and Edvard Brandes, the Minister of Finance. Archive materials show that, during these talks, Lansing implied that if an agreement on the sale of the islands was not reached, the U.S. military might occupy the islands to prevent their seizure by Germany.

=== Negotiations for Greenland and sale price ===
In November 1915, the Danish Minister at Washington, Constantin Brun, brought up a proposal that the United States simultaneously recognize Danish sovereignty over Greenland as part of the negotiations. Historian Bo Lidegaard questions the utility of such a declaration, as the country had never disputed Danish sovereignty. From an American perspective, although it had a claim on northern Greenland based on explorations by Charles Francis Hall and Robert Peary, the United States decided that the Virgin Islands purchase was more important, especially because of the nearby Panama Canal. From a security standpoint, the fact that British North America lay between Greenland and American territory seemed sufficient to consider a potential German occupation of the northern island as less concerning than the southern islands. Moreover, if the concession of Greenland was to be made, it would be easier to incorporate into a single treaty rather than attempt passing two treaties through the United States Senate.

Lansing told the Danish minister, "that the Danish West Indies and Greenland should be combined in one negotiation; that Denmark had something which we desired, and that evidently we had something which Denmark desired; that it seemed to me it would be possibly the most advisable way to incorporate the two subjects in one treaty rather than to have a treaty of cession of the Danish West Indies and a protocol relating to Greenland. The Minister said he had no objection to adopting this course."

During 1916, the two sides agreed to a sale price of $25,000,000, and the United States accepted a Danish demand for a declaration stating that they would "not object to the Danish Government extending their political and economic interests to the whole of Greenland". In the declaration, Lansing noted that he was "the undersigned Secretary of State of the United States of America, duly authorized by his Government." Thus vested with the authority to make a binding unilateral declaration, the 1916 Lansing Declaration, soon followed by ratification by the US Senate, US President, and Denmark and a proclamation by President Woodrow Wilson, has been considered a binding contract and part of the Treaty of the Danish West Indies; the material breach of which is argued to have weakened the legal foundation of US sovereignty in the Virgin Islands.

In his memoirs, Lansing acknowledged that while he felt that the United States could have negotiated a lower price for the islands, "In view of the uncertain state of international affairs prolongation of the negotiations would have been dangerous just as would the reduction of the purchase price below a figure sufficiently large to satisfy the Danish people. Expediency demanded that in the circumstances the United States should be generous." Furthermore, he wrote, "compared with the advantage of overcoming Danish opposition to the cession of the West Indian possessions of Denmark, to have refused to recognize Danish sovereignty over Greenland would have been folly. The whole negotiation might have been wrecked if we had inclined to accede to this request of the Danish Government."

At the time of the purchase, the colony did not include Water Island, which had been sold by the Danish state to the East Asiatic Company, a private shipping company, in 1905. The company eventually sold the island to the United States in 1944, during the German occupation of Denmark.

=== Ratification ===
The treaty was signed on 4 August 1916, at the Biltmore Hotel in New York City, by Danish Minister Constantin Brun and Secretary of State Robert Lansing. The U.S. Senate approved the treaty on 7 September 1916. A Danish referendum was held on 14 December 1916, and on 22 December the Rigsdagen (the Danish parliament) ratified the treaty. U.S. President Woodrow Wilson ratified the treaty on 16 January 1917. Ratifications of the treaty were formally exchanged in Washington, D.C., on 17 January 1917. On 25 January, President Wilson issued a proclamation on the treaty, and on 9 March, King Christian X of Denmark also issued a proclamation.

On 31 March 1917, in Washington, D.C., a warrant for twenty five million dollars in gold was presented to Danish Minister Constantin Brun by Secretary of State Robert Lansing. Little reaction to the sale occurred among Danes, who saw the West Indies as an investment despite more than two centuries of possession.

Denmark formally ceded St. Croix, St. John and St. Thomas to the United States of America in simultaneous ceremonies held on both St. Thomas and St. Croix at 4:00 in the afternoon. Accompanied by honor guards of both nations and to the sound of bands playing their national anthems, the Danish flag was lowered and the American flag was raised.

Transfer Day is celebrated annually on March 31 as a public holiday in the Virgin Islands.

== Cost ==
David R. Barker of the University of Iowa stated that the acquisition of the Virgin Islands "is the clearest example of a negative net present value purchase" among US territorial acquisitions. "Expenses are high, and net revenues have been non-existent", he wrote; because of the Naval Appropriations Act For 1922, all tax revenue goes to the local government.
