= German interest in the Caribbean =

German interest in the Caribbean involved a series of unsuccessful proposals made by the Imperial German Navy (Kaiserliche Marine) during the late-nineteenth century to establish a coaling station somewhere in the Caribbean. The German Empire (founded in 1871) was rapidly building a world-class navy, but coal-burning warships needed frequent refueling and could operate only within range of a coaling station. Preliminary plans were vetoed by Otto von Bismarck (Chancellor from 1871 to 1890).

The countries of northern South America – Ecuador, Colombia, and Venezuela – were viewed by German planners as a buffer to protect German interest in Argentina, Brazil, Chile, and Uruguay from the growing influence of the United States. By 1900, American "naval planners were obsessed with German designs in the hemisphere and countered with energetic efforts to secure naval sites in the Caribbean." German naval planners in the 1890-1910 era denounced the Monroe Doctrine as a self-aggrandizing legal pretension to dominate the hemisphere. They were even more concerned with the possible American canal in Panama, because it would lead to full American hegemony in the Caribbean. The stakes were laid out in the German war-aims proposed by the Imperial Navy in 1903: a "firm position in the West Indies", a "free hand in South America", and an official "revocation of the Monroe Doctrine" would provide a solid foundation for "our trade to the West Indies, Central and South America."

== History ==
In the mid-1860s, Prussia army and naval leaders considered building a coaling station in the Caribbean and proposed to purchase the island of Curaçao from the Netherlands. However, Chancellor Otto von Bismarck was strongly opposed since he wanted to avoid difficulties with the United States and so nothing happened. Bismarck was removed from power by Kaiser Wilhelm II in 1890, and German naval strategists again turned their attention to the Caribbean, but they failed to establish a naval base at Margarita Island, Venezuela.

Policymakers in Germany analysed the possibility of establishing bases on Margarita Island and showed interest in the Galápagos Islands but soon abandoned any such designs given that far-flung bases in northern South America would be very vulnerable. Germany attempted to promote Chile, a country that was heavily influenced by Germany, into a regional counterweight to the United States. Indeed, Britain and Germany managed through Chile to have Ecuador deny the United States a naval base in the Galápagos Islands.

During the Venezuelan crisis of 1902–1903, Britain and Germany sent warships to blockade Venezuela after it had defaulted on its foreign loan repayments. Germany intended to land troops and occupy Venezuelan ports, but US President Theodore Roosevelt forced the Germans to back down by sending his own fleet and by threatening war if the Germans landed. By 1904, German naval strategists had turned their attention to Mexico; they hoped to establish a naval base in a Mexican port on the Caribbean but dropped that plan. In 1917, they proposed a military alliance in a war against the United States in the Zimmermann Telegram, which accelerated American entry into World War I.

== See also ==
- German colonial empire
- German colonial projects before 1871
- German colonization of the Americas
  - Saint Thomas (Brandenburg colony)
- Anti-Americanism
- Anti-German sentiment
- Operation Bolivar
