= Hillingsø =

Surname list

Hillingsø is a surname. Notable people with the surname include:

- Birgitta Hillingsø (born 1940), Danish antiques dealer
- Ellen Hillingsø (born 1967), Danish actress
- Kjeld Hillingsø (born 1935), Danish general
- Lars Hillingsø (1938–2005), Danish fashion designer
