= Ellen Hillingsø =

Danish actress (born 1967)

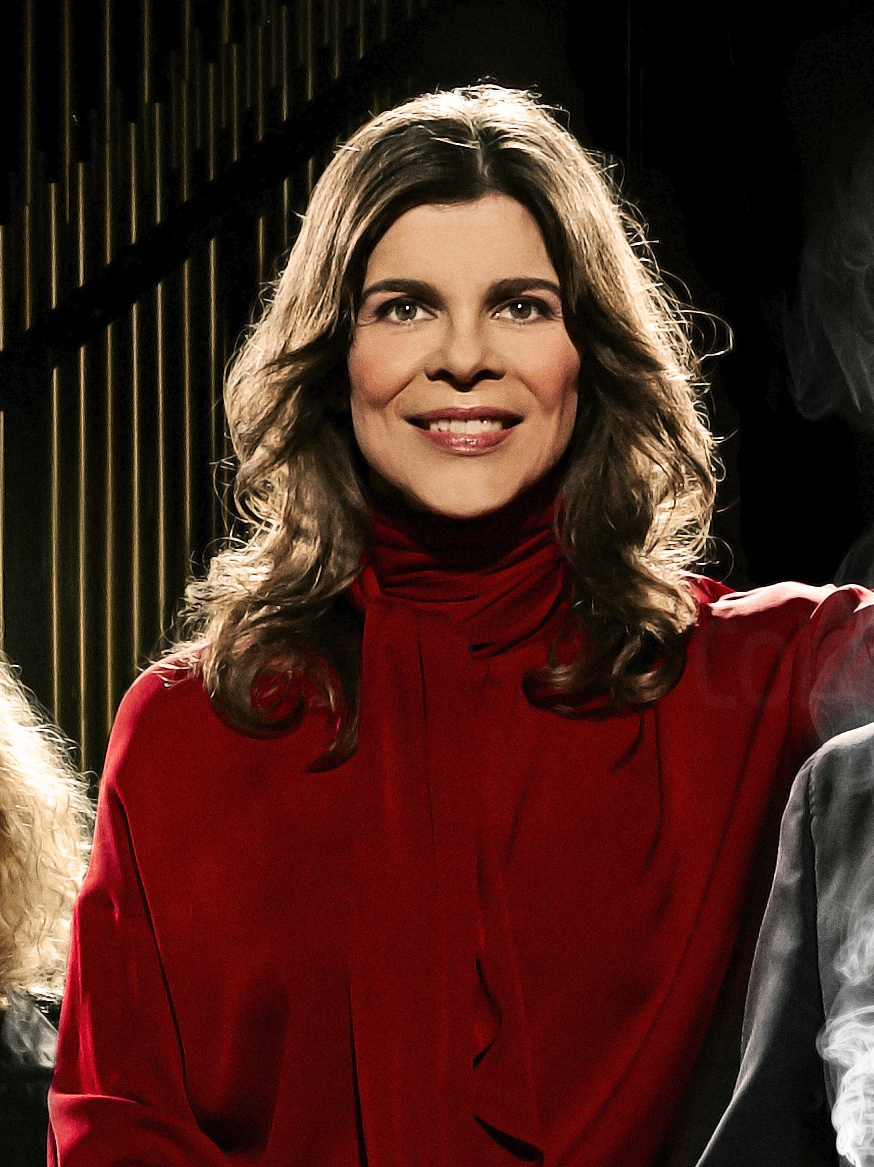
- Hillingsø in 2017
- Born: 9 March 1967 (age 59); Copenhagen, Denmark
- Occupations: Actress, voice actress, narrator
- Years active: 1988–present
- Spouse: Christoffer Castenskiold (m. 2000)
- Children: 2
- Parent(s): Kjeld Hillingsø; Birgitta Juel
- Relatives: Gregers Juel (grandfather); Lars Hillingsø (uncle)

Ellen Gunilla Hillingsø (born 9 March 1967) is a Danish actress. She started her acting career on stage, before starring in many Danish films, more recently becoming known for her work in TV series, including The Bridge (2011–2018) and Oxen (TV series) (2023–). She is also a voice actress, narrating audio books.

== Early life and education ==
Ellen Gunilla Hillingsø was born on 9 March 1967 in Copenhagen to Kjeld Georg Hilligsøe Hillingsø, then a lieutenant in the Danish Royal Life Guards, and Ellen Birgitta Hillingsø. Her parents had connections with the Danish royal family.

Hillingsø first considered becoming a journalist, becoming a host on TV 2 in the 1980s.

She then turned to acting, studying drama at the Aarhus Theatre Academy from 1990, graduating in 1994.

== Career ==
Hillingsø made her debut in the comedy film Huller i suppen in 1988, playing a small role alongside the comic duo John and Aage (Povl Erik Carstensen and Morten Lorentzen). After appearing in En verden til forskel (1989), she worked as a stage actress at Aarhus Theatre, both as a student there as well as for two years after graduating.

In 1996, Hillingsø appeared in Peter Thorsboe's 1996 drama Krystalbarnet, in which she starred with Mirosław Baka, Grażyna Barszczewska, and Helene Egelund. In 1999, she starred in Søren Kragh-Jacobsen's Mifune's Last Song alongside Iben Hjejle, Anders Hove, Sofie Gråbøl, and Paprika Steen. In 2007, she appeared in Karlas kabale, based on the 2003 book of the same title written by Renée Simonsen. Also in 2007 she starred in the Danish television police drama Anna Pihl.

In 2010 she starred in the film Eksperimentet, directed by Louise Friedberg. The film deals with social experiments and the problem of cultural genocide in Greenland. The film premiered on 28 August 2010 in the Katuaq Culture Centre in Nuuk, the capital of Greenland.

In 2023, she starred as head of PET (the Danish intelligence service) in Oxen, reprising the role in the second series, broadcast in Denmark in 2025.

=== Voice work ===
Aside from her work as an actress, Hillingsø has done notable work as a voice actress in cartoons, film and TV, and in audio books.

== Personal life ==
Hillingsø married the director of Saxo Bank, Christoffer Castenskiold, on 27 December 2000. They have two children together.

== Filmography ==
=== Film ===
- Huller i suppen (1988)
- En verden til forskel (1989)
- Krystalbarnet (1996)
- Sekten (1997)
- Mifunes sidste sang (1999)
- Klinkevals (1999)
- Når lysterne tændes (2001)
- Jolly Roger (2001)
- En kort en lang (2001)
- Olsen-banden Junior (2001)
- Drengen der ville gøre det umulige
- Floden (2002 - stemme)
- Silkevejen (2004)
- Opbrud (2005)
- Afrejsen (2005)
- Allegro (2005)
- Den Rette Ånd (2005)
- Sprængfarlig bombe (2006)
- Anja og Viktor - brændende kærlighed (2007)
- Karlas kabale (2007)
- En forelskelse (2008)
- Maj & Charlie (2008)
- Karla og Katrine (2009)
- Over gaden under vandet (2009)
- Karla og Jonas (2010)
- Eksperimentet (2010)

=== TV ===
- Charlot og Charlotte (1996)
- Hvor svært kan det være (2002)
- Absalons hemmelighed (2006)
- Anna Pihl (2007)
- Album (2008)
- Livvagterne (2009)
- The Bridge (2011–2018)
- Rita (2012–2020)
- Hjørdis (2015)
- Oxen (TV series) (2023–)
