= Forced contraception of women in Greenland =

Danish forced birth control program in Greenland

From the 1960s through the 1990s, Danish physicians forced contraception onto thousands of Greenlandic Inuit women and girls, often as young as 12 years old, by placing intrauterine devices (IUDs) in them without consent, under the direction of the Danish government.

The purpose of the campaign was to reduce the birth rate in Greenland, and the Danish Broadcasting Corporation reported that this was intended to reduce costs for Denmark in funding daycare institutions, schools and health facilities in Greenland. (Note: Fuglsang Holm 2022: "danske politikere i 60-70'erne havde en helt bevidst strategi om at nedbringe befolkningsvæksten i Grønland" Google Translate: ["Danish politicians in the 60s and 70s had a very conscious strategy of reducing population growth in Greenland"]) (Note: Veirum 2022: "Kampagnen blev ifølge DR [Danmarks Radio] sat i gang med den begrundelse, at et stigende fødselstal betød højere udgifter for Danmark til daginstitutioner, skoler og sundhedsfaciliteter i Grønland." Google Translate: ["According to DR [Danish Broadcasting Corporation], the campaign was launched on the grounds that an increasing birth rate meant higher costs for Denmark for daycare institutions, schools and health facilities in Greenland."]) Some cases also occurred after the responsibility of the health care system was transferred to the Greenland government in 1991. Allegations continued into the 2000s, with the most recent reported cases in 2018.

While Greenlandic politicians Aki-Matilda Høegh-Dam, Mimi Karlsen and former Prime Minister Múte Bourup Egede have described the birth control campaign as genocide, Danish jurist Frederik Harhoff described the campaign as an injustice but lacking genocidal intent. Greenland's Human Rights Council stated the campaign violated existing privacy regulations.

In 2022, the Danish and Greenlandic governments agreed to hold a two-year investigation into the campaign, though some activists have spoken against the investigation's limited scope. In 2023, the investigation formally began, and 67 women sued the Danish government. The investigation is scheduled to conclude in 2026. In September 2025, the report was released. Danish Prime Minister Mette Frederiksen and Greenlandic Prime Minister Jens-Frederik Nielsen have formally apologized for the case.

== Involuntary fertility control program ==
Between around 1966 and 1975, thousands of Greenlandic Inuit girls and women had intrauterine devices (IUDs) inserted to prevent pregnancy under the direction of the Danish government and by Danish doctors. This practice is referred to in Danish as spiralsagen or spiralkampagnen, translated variously as the "spiral case", "spiral campaign", "coil case", "coil campaign", or the "IUD case"; the specific type of IUD used was referred to as a "coil" (Danish: spiral).

Half of the 9,000 women in Greenland who could have children were given IUDs in the first five years of the program; some of the affected girls were as young as 12, and in many cases, women (and in the case of girls, their parents) did not consent to the procedure. For instance, Naja Lyberth was 13 or 14 years old, Elisibánguak' Jeremiasssen was 13, and Arnannguaq Poulsen was 16 and staying in Denmark when she received hers. All of the girls in Lyberth's class were told to have IUDs placed by a visiting doctor and then taken to a hospital for them to be inserted.

The purpose of the campaign was to reduce the birth rate in Greenland, and the Danish Broadcasting Corporation reported that this was intended to reduce costs for Denmark in funding daycare institutions, schools and health facilities in Greenland. (Note: Fuglsang Holm 2022: "danske politikere i 60-70'erne havde en helt bevidst strategi om at nedbringe befolkningsvæksten i Grønland" Google Translate: ["Danish politicians in the 60s and 70s had a very conscious strategy of reducing population growth in Greenland"]) (Note: Veirum 2022: "Kampagnen blev ifølge DR [Danmarks Radio] sat i gang med den begrundelse, at et stigende fødselstal betød højere udgifter for Danmark til daginstitutioner, skoler og sundhedsfaciliteter i Grønland." Google Translate: ["According to DR [Danish Broadcasting Corporation], the campaign was launched on the grounds that an increasing birth rate meant higher costs for Denmark for daycare institutions, schools and health facilities in Greenland."]) Thousands of girls and women ultimately had IUDs placed without their consent during the campaign. As a result, the birth rate in Greenland was halved in just a few years.

Portions of the campaign were unlawful. In Greenland, it was illegal for doctors to give girls contraception without parental consent until 1970; past 1970, it was against the law for doctors to place IUDs in girls, like Lybert, who were under 15 and had never been pregnant. Greenland received autonomy in its healthcare system in 1991.

== Investigations and reaction ==
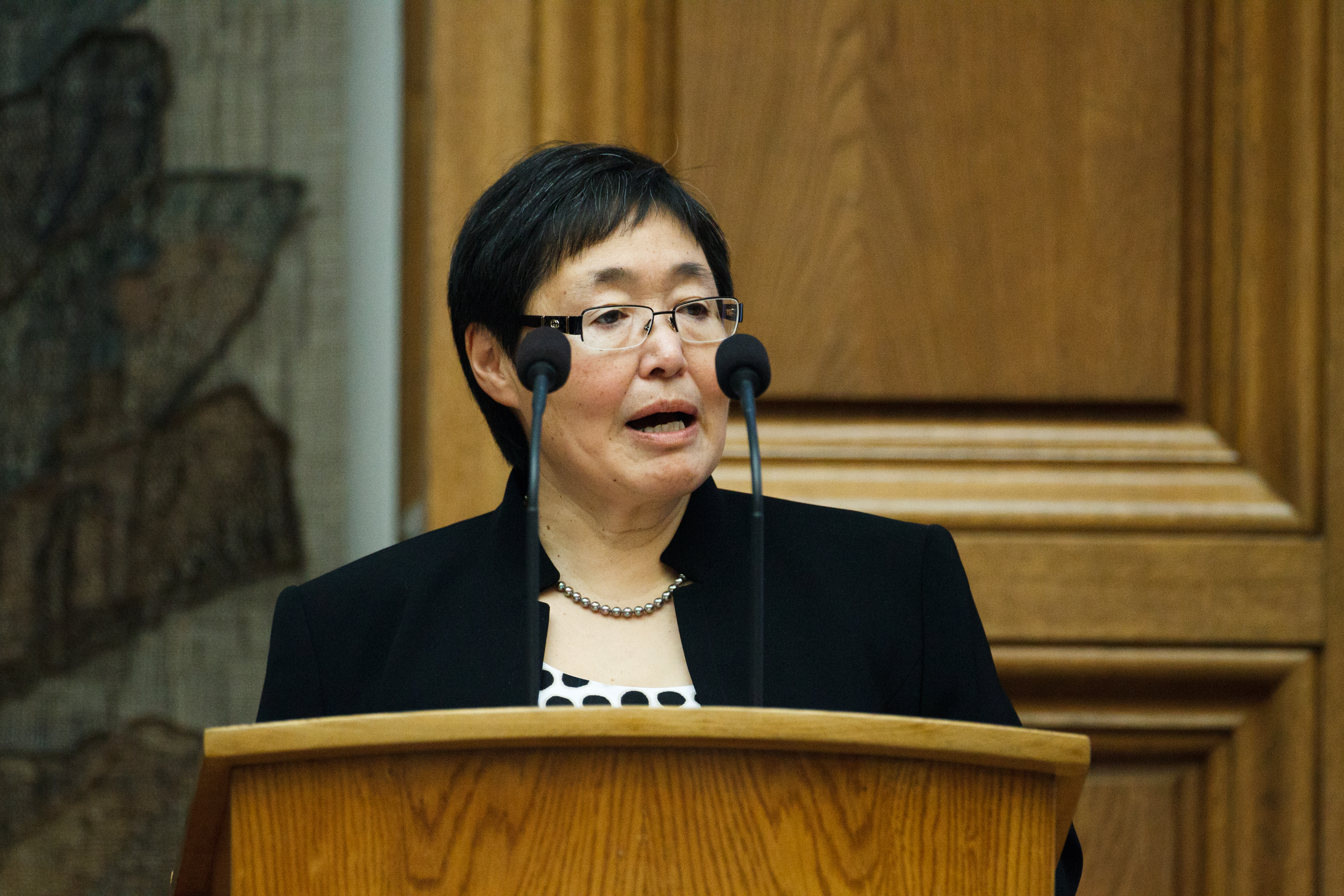
Mimi Karlsen (pictured in 2011), who argued the birth control campaign amounted to genocide.

In 2017, Naja Lyberth was among the first people to publicly discuss the spiral campaign; she wrote on Facebook about her experiences. In 2022, the podcast Spiralkampagnen ("Spiral Campaign"), hosted by the Danish Broadcasting Corporation, uncovered the campaign's records. Following the podcast's release that year, politicians and human rights organisations began calling for investigations; the party Naleraq wrote legislation to investigate. On 2 June, the Inatsisartut (Greenlandic parliament) voted to demand that the Danish government investigate the history of the campaign. Later that year, the Danish and Greenlandic governments agreed to begin a two-year investigation. It seeks to document the background of the birth control campaign; its implementation, including Greenlandic government involvement; the reasons the campaign began and continued; and other fertility control programs through 1991. The investigation formally began in May 2023; it was scheduled for completion in May 2025, but investigators requested an extension until 31 January 2026. The investigators are all women from Greenland and Denmark.

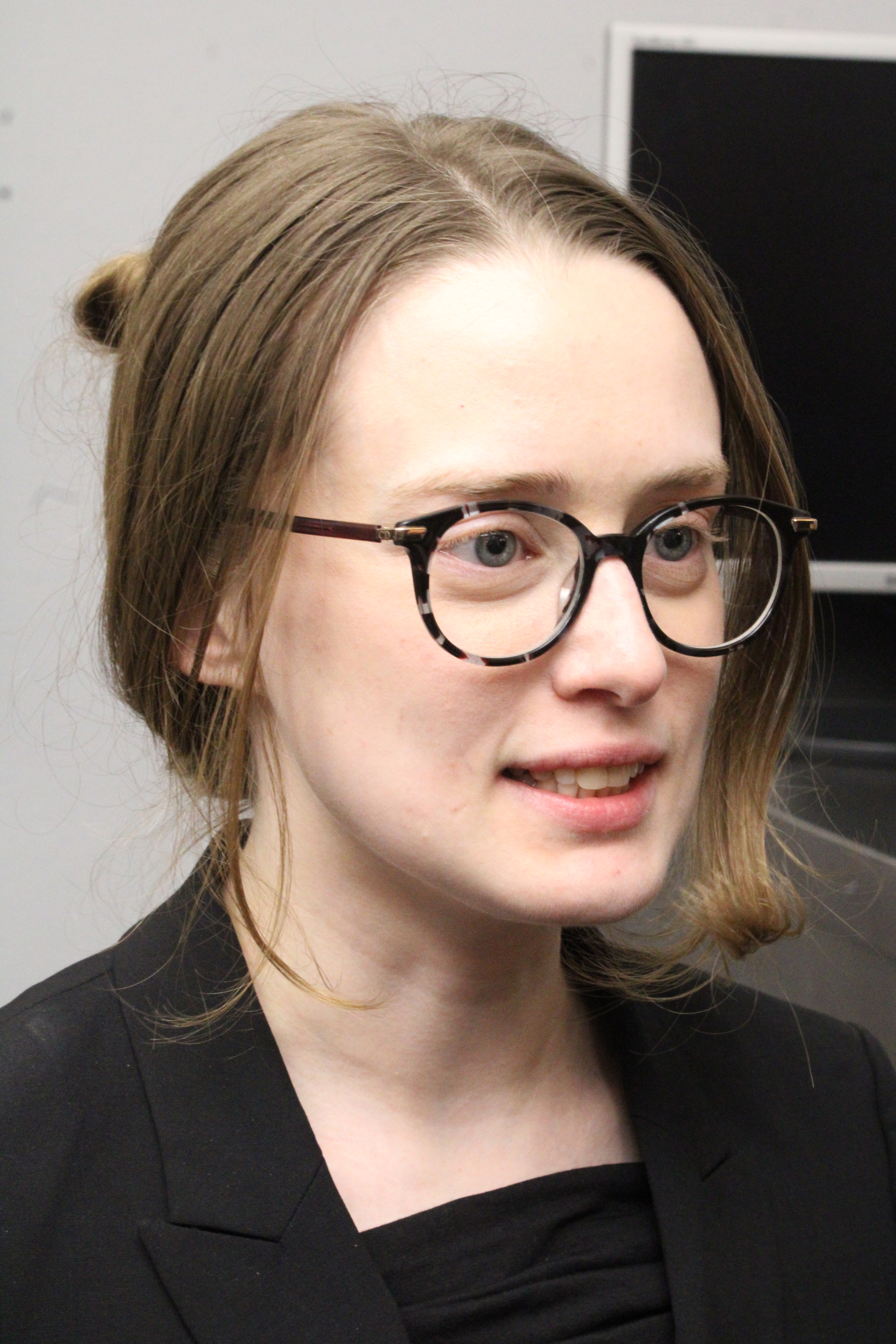
Aki-Matilda Høegh-Dam (pictured in 2026), who called the birth control campaign genocide.

The Inuit Ataqatigiit Minister of Health, Mimi Karlsen, asked women affected by the fertility control program to call Tusaannga, a social services and support hotline. Aki-Matilda Høegh-Dam, a Siumut member of the Folketing (Danish parliament) called the campaign genocide. She stated that in the Danish desire to modernise Greenland, elevating the material conditions of its residents was too expensive, so the government instituted a program to commit genocide on the population. Danish lawyer Mads Pramming likened the case to the Little Danes experiment, a 1951 Danish operation that resettled 22 Greenlandic children in Denmark. Lyberth said in 2022 that the campaign stole her virginity, caused her pain, may have caused complications for her later in life, and continued to traumatise her into adulthood. According to Greenland's Human Rights Council, regulations regarding family life and privacy were violated.

Some activists have criticised the limited scope of the campaign, which extends only to 1991. In December 2022, BBC News noted that numerous women and girls allege that this campaign continued after 1991. Karlsen said in a BBC interview that she would forward allegations to the Greenlandic medical authorities to see if they are true and if they reflect widespread practises related to the spiral case. At least nine women have reported post-1991 nonconsensual IUD placements to the government; medical investigators found four operations occurred without consent (three had documented consent), eight of the nine cases are alleged to have happened after the year 2000, and most happened while the women were under anesthesia for induced abortions. Nivi Olsen, a Demokraatit member of the Inatsisartut, has called for the investigation to be broadened to include post-1991 birth control measures.

In October 2023, Lyberth and 66 other women sued the Danish government for DKK 300,000 each (approximately US$47,695). In March 2024, 143 women sued the Danish government and demanded 43 million kroner, in total. In response to the investigation, Greenland's Prime Minister Múte Bourup Egede accused Denmark of committing the crime of genocide in Greenland.

In response to the allegation that the campaign amounted to genocide, spokesperson for the Conservative People's Party in Denmark Rasmus Jarlov and Danish Social Liberal Party leader Martin Lidegaard have denied the accusation, both claiming that there was no concerted effort to exterminate Greenlandic Inuit. Trine Mach, a spokesperson for Red–Green Alliance, neither disputed nor endorsed calling the practice genocide, although she asked for Denmark to apologise for the practice. Among academics, the label of genocide is disputed; Danish jurist Frederik Harhoff argued that it may have been a crime against humanity or a human rights violation, but it did not amount to genocide, and he argued there was a lack of genocidal intent on the part of authorities to clear Greenland of its indigenous population. Colonial researcher Naja Graugaard Dyrendom argued that the practice was propelled by ethnic animus and should be investigated as a genocide.

== See also ==
- Godhavn inquiry – a 2011 Danish government inquiry into the conditions of children's homes between 1945 and 1976
- Little Danes experiment – 1951 forced relocation of Greenlandic Inuit children to Danish families
- Legally fatherless – Danish laws denying some Greenlandic children the right to inherit from their Danish fathers
- Forældrekompetenceundersøgelse – a Danish psychometric assessment of parental competence that has been characterized as discriminatory and racist when used on Greenlandic parents
- Sterilization of Native American women
