= Legally fatherless =

Historical Danish laws

Between 1914 and either 1963 (Kitaa) or 1974 (Avannaa and Tunu), Danish law deemed the children of unmarried Greenlandic women legally fatherless (Danish: juridisk faderløse): having no right to know or inherit from their biological fathers. Many of the fathers were Danish, so the laws, in effect, racially segregated Danish men from their responsibilities and duties in Greenlandic society. Legally imposed racial segregation existed in some form in Greenland throughout Danish colonial rule, including laws prohibiting miscegenation.

An investigative report, commissioned by the Danish government, was released in 2011. Three years later, legally fatherless children were awarded the right to sue for paternity and inherit property from their fathers. As of 2023, legal proceedings by some legally fatherless against the Danish state have begun.

== Background and laws ==
Prior to and during the period of the legal fatherlessness laws, Denmark was the colonial ruler of Greenland. Throughout its rule, Denmark instituted a system racially segregating Danish society from Greenlandic society, including laws prohibiting miscegenation and certain kinds of relationships between Danish men and Greenlandic Inuit women. Throughout the twentieth century, but particularly in the 1950s and 1960s, Danish men temporarily settled in Greenland and fathered children with Greenlandic women. Since their settlement was temporary, many men ultimately left behind children without fathers.

Early colonial laws (including a 1782 rule and an 1873 revision) required Danish men to pay an annual fee to support their illegitimate children. Between 1890 and 1910, the support rules varied considerably.

In 1914, Denmark began creating a system of legal fatherlessness, where the children of unwed Greenlandic mothers had no right to know or inherit from their fathers. The laws shielded many Danish men from having any responsibility for their Greenlandic children. In effect, they were segregationist. The laws lasted until 1963 in Kitaa, and were repealed in Avannaa and Tunu in 1974. Hundreds of legally fatherless children were born before the laws were replaced. One estimate in 2016 suggests between 5,000 and 8,000 children were born legally fatherless.

== Activism ==
In 2009, Anne Sofie Hardenberg released an autobiography of her experiences as a legally fatherless child (Kampen for en Far, English: The Fight for a Father), and an organization for the legally fatherless was formed, Kattuffik Ataata. The next year, the Danish government hired historians from Denmark and Greenland to investigate the issue; their report was published in 2011.

Due to activism and demands by Greenlandic politicians, Denmark fully reversed the legal fatherlessness provisions in 2014. The new law granted the right of Greenlandic children of unwed mothers to inherit from their fathers and sue for paternity. In 2019, some 4.7 million kroner (roughly USD$700,000) was set aside by Denmark for psychological and legal assistance for the legally fatherless, though much of it has not been used.

They continue to press for compensation; one group of 26 legally fatherless persons, represented by the same lawyer representing the little Danes experiment survivors (Mads Pramming), demanded DKK 125,000 kroner in 2022 (roughly USD$19,000). In April 2023, the Danish government refused to compensate the group. That year, legal proceedings by 26 legally fatherless people began against the state. The Danish Ministry of Justice guaranteed their trial would proceed without costs, and the Danish Institute for Human Rights offered their assistance to the group.

== See also ==
- Godhavn inquiry – Report on child abuse and mistreatment in Danish children's homes between 1945 and 1976; in 2019, the government apologised in this case as well
- Little Danes experiment – 1951 forced relocation of Greenlandic Inuit children to Danish families
- Spiral case – an ongoing investigation into the forced sterilization of Greenlandic Inuit women during the 1960s and 1970s by Danish physicians, often without the women's consent and under the direction of government officials
- Forældrekompetenceundersøgelse – a Danish psychometric assessment of parental competence that has been characterized as discriminatory and racist when used on Greenlandic parents
