= FKU =

FKU may refer to:

- FKU Corrective Colony No. 2 of the FSIN of Russia for Vladimir Oblast), general regime corrective colony located on the outskirts of the town of Pokrov in Vladimir Oblast, Russia.
- FKU IK-3, Kharp of the Federal Penitentiary Service of Russia for the Yamalo-Nenets Autonomous Okrug, also known as Polar Wolf
- Forældrekompetenceundersøgelse (acronym FKU), Danish psychometric assessment of parental competence

== See also ==
- Fu (disambiguation)
- Fuck You (disambiguation)
