= Child abuse inquiry =

Child abuse inquiry may refer to:

- Mother and Baby Homes Commission of Investigation - Irish inquiry, which reported in 2021
- Commission to Inquire into Child Abuse - Irish inquiry, which published the Ryan Report in 2009
- Ferns Report - 2005 report into child abuse in the Diocese of Ferns, in Ireland
- Independent Inquiry into Child Sexual Abuse - 2014 English & Welsh inquiry
- Murphy Report - Irish report, published in 2009, on the Sexual abuse cases in the Catholic archdiocese of Dublin
- Royal Commission of Inquiry into Abuse in Care – New Zealand royal commission
- Scottish Child Abuse Inquiry – Government inquiry set up in 2015
- Godhavn inquiry – 2011 Danish child home abuse inquiry
- Investigations into the Rotherham child sexual exploitation scandal – Investigations into sexual exploitation scandal in England
- Forde Inquiry – 1999 report on child abuse presented to the government of Queensland, Australia
- Royal Commission into Institutional Responses to Child Sexual Abuse – 2010s independent public inquiry in Australia
- Northern Ireland Historical Institutional Abuse Inquiry – Legal inquiry
