= Lars Hillingsø =

Danish fashion designer (1938–2005)

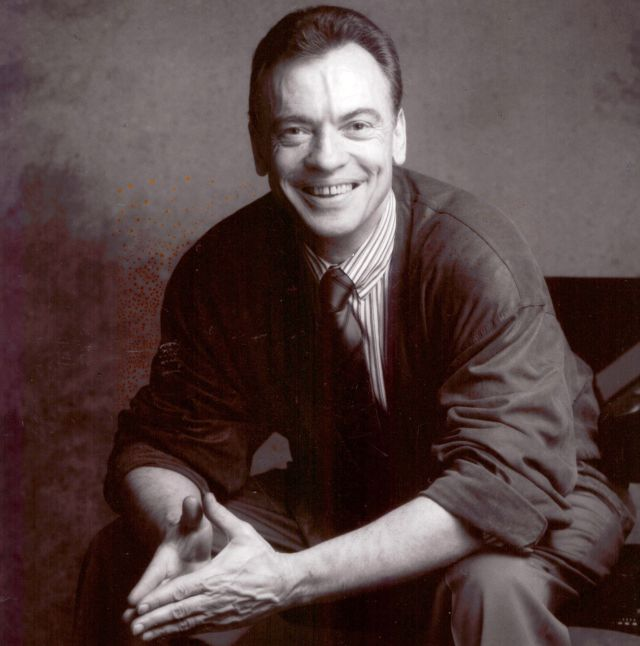
- Hillingsø in 1983
- Born: 12 July 1938; Copenhagen, Denmark
- Died: 2005 (aged 66–67); Croissanville, Calvados, France
- Education: Aarhus Katedralskole
- Occupation: Fashion designer
- Label: Lars Paris
- Relatives: Kjeld Hillingsø (brother); Birgitta Hillingsø (sister-in-law); Ellen Hillingsø (niece)

Lars Hillingsø (12 July 1938 – 2005) was a Danish fashion designer and founder of the Lars Paris brand.

== Biography ==
=== Early years ===
Hillingsø was born in Copenhagen on 12 July 1938 to a Jewish family. His father, Knud Erhard Hillingsø Larsen (1905–1978), was Danish, and his mother, Hildegard Dorthea Louise (née Bugge; died 1997), was born in Kiel, Germany. He had an older brother, the lieutenant general Kjeld Hillingsø. He was educated at the Aarhus Katedralskole, in Jutland.

From a young age, Hillingsø was fascinated by fashion, clothing and its effects, colours and materials. He won his first fashion competition at the age of 13 for a Danish newspaper.

In 1954, the weekly newspaper in the German city of Konstanz named Hillingsø a "wunderkind" (a prodigy) in an article dedicated to him. A year later, he began working at a large fashion store in Aarhus to learn more about fashion practice. In 1956, Hillingsø joined the Bloch School in Aarhus to learn about the technique of patronage from a French teacher. The same year, the Secrétariat international de la laine de Paris (the International Wool Secretariat of Paris) launched national competitions in various countries, and Hillingsø won two prizes in the Danish contest; first prize for a coat and a dress, and second prize for a suit.

In 1959, at age 19, Hillingsø won the Secrétariat international de la laine de Paris' International First Prize for a coat manufactured by the haute couture houses Lanvin and Castillo. This prize was given the year previously to Yves Saint Laurent and Karl Lagerfeld. Hillingsø was always presented the awards by Christian Dior, who opened his doors to the winners. However, the day Dior died, he had been due to present Hillingsø with an award. It was presented to him by Pierre Cardin instead.

After two and a half years of service with the United Nations Peacekeepers, Hillingsø was hired by Cristóbal Balenciaga in 1961. The following year, he became the assistant of fashion designer Jacques Griffe, and then in 1963 he became a model maker for Guy Laroche. He went on to sign a contract with Jacqueline Godart, with whom he worked for two seasons. In 1964, for the wedding of Princess Anne-Marie of Denmark and King Constantine II of Greece, Hillingsø dressed various princesses and royals. In 1965, Hillingsø became responsible for the 'young woman' line at Nina Ricci for a year and a half. Subsequently, he was a stylist at Molyneux in 1968 and Maggy Rouff in 1970 for six seasons.

=== Lars Paris ===
In 1974, Hillingsø created his brand "Lars Paris" and moved to the rue de la Grange-Batelière in Paris, in the same building as the embroiderer François Lesage. He created a range of luxury sports clothing as well as numerous evening dresses embroidered by Lesage, up until the end of the 1980s. His brand was distributed through various points of purchase in Paris and in Germany, Switzerland, Belgium, Italy, Scandinavia, the United States, Japan and the Middle East.

Hillingsø organised numerous fashion shows in both Europe and the United States over the years. In 1975, his evening dress "Vulcain" was put into the Palais Galliera in Paris. In 1981, Hillingsø dressed Queen Margrethe II of Denmark for her official visit to Japan. He also organised a show at Illum in Copenhagen for Queen Margrethe and her mother, Queen Ingrid.

In 1982, Hillingsø participated in a large show as part of a gala at the Grand Hôtel in Stockholm with Princess Lilian, Duchess of Halland, and, in 1987, he created a show in Munich for the Winter Ball organised by the German magazine "Madame". Between 1988 and 1989, Hillingsø devoted himself to the reintroduction of seal furs in Denmark, and created a long coat made of real seal fur for the Queen of Denmark, who wears it on official outings. There was great interest in this return. Lars then went on to open a tannery, the largest and most modern in the world, in Qaqortoq, Greenland, with a view to revitalising the national economy and giving work to Greenlanders. In 1989, Hillingsø did a show with his furs and sweaters at the Ny Carlsberg Glyptotek in Copenhagen and created several ensembles for the Queen of Denmark for her official visit to Greenland.

In 1990, the Trade Center of Greenland was established in Copenhagen, an organisation with a global monopoly on seal furs from Greenland, in which Hillingsø opened a furs distribution office for Scandinavia. He directed numerous fashion shows, most notably for the Stockholm School of Economics, for L'Oréal in Düsseldorf, others in Copenhagen, Frankfurt and Tokyo, and a charity show in Toronto, Canada under the patronage of Mila Mulroney, wife of then-Prime Minister of Canada Brian Mulroney. He also undertook an international tour showcasing mink furs. Also in 1990, the National Museum of Denmark purchased one of his creations, Matisse, which was characterised by its innovative use of techniques, its conception and the particular treatment of the seal fur.

=== Later years ===
In 1991, the Société de diffusion d'image de marque, of which Hillingsø was artistic director, filed for bankruptcy after having been bought by Danish officials who wanted to recover and take over the Lars Paris brand. Hillingsø was then forced to leave his Paris studio and subsequently created the Société Aurore, of which he became artistic director, and moved to the Pays d'Auge in Normandy. Hillingsø had to completely restructure his activities and so decided to become a patron of various prototypes. He emphasised his work on the architecture of garments and the practical details which aid in a woman's life. He held various shows in Germany and at the French Embassy, Copenhagen alongside other Parisian brands. Until 2002, he also held two shows a year at the Hôtel de Crillon on the Place de la Concorde in Paris.

After the definitive closure of the Trade Center in Copenhagen at the beginning of 1993, Hillingsø began a new collaboration with Koppel & Co. on mink fur, seal fur and Tuscan sheep's wool. He worked in Hong Kong, Greece and Hungary. In 1994, Queen Margrethe II of Denmark made Hillingsø a Knight of the Order of the Dannebrog.

In 1995 and 1996, he created charity fashion shows for the Friends vieilles maisons françaises in San Francisco, Florida and Phoenix, Arizona.

Hillingsø died of cancer at his manor in Croissanville, Calvados in 2005.

== Awards and honours ==
=== Denmark ===
Order of the Dannebrog (Knight)
