= Kjeld Hillingsø =

Danish general (born 1935)

Lieutenant General Kjeld Hillingsø SK BVO
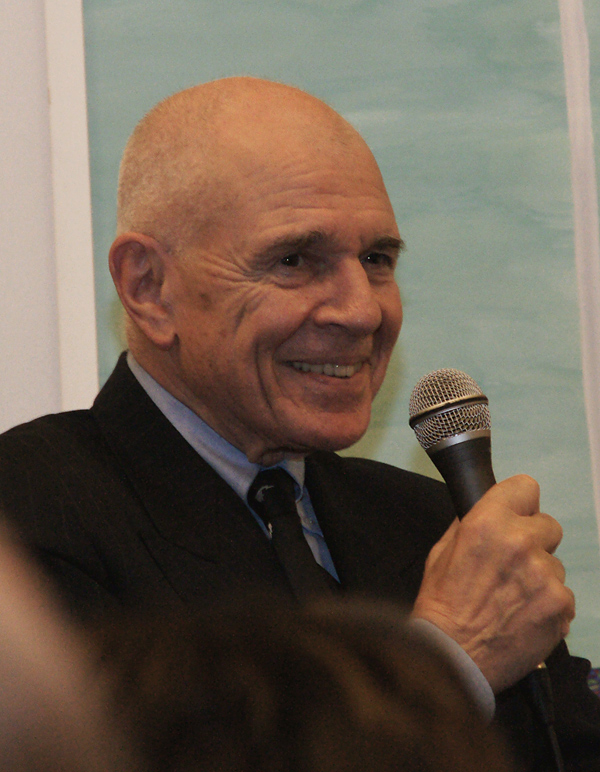
- Hillingsø in 2009.
- Born: Kjeld Georg Hilligsøe Hillingsø; 21 April 1935 (age 91); Frederiksberg, Denmark
- Spouse: Birgitta Juel (m. 1963)
- Children: 2; including Ellen Hillingsø
- Relatives: Lars Hillingsø (brother)
- Military career
- Allegiance: Denmark
- Service: Royal Danish Navy (1955-1959); Royal Danish Army (1959-1995)
- Years of service: 1955-1995
- Rank: Lieutenant General
- Commands: Defence Command (1986-1990); Army Command (1990-1991); Army Operational Command (1991-1993); Allied Forces Baltic Approaches (1993-1995)
- Awards: Grand Cross of the Order of the Dannebrog; Order of the Cross of the Eagle (Estonia); Order of Merit of the Federal Republic of Germany

Lieutenant General Kjeld Georg Hilligsøe Hillingsø SK BVO (born 21 April 1935) is a Danish retired general. He is also the father of the actress Ellen Hillingsø.

== Biography ==
=== Early life ===
Hillingsø was born on 21 April 1935 to a Jewish family. His father, Knud Erhard Hillingsø Larsen (1905-1978) was Danish, and his mother Hildegard Dorthea Louise (née Bugge; died 1997), was born in Kiel, Germany. Hillingsø also had a younger brother, the fashion designer Lars Hillingsø.

=== Military career ===
Hillingsø was made a sergeant in the Royal Danish Navy in 1955, but changed to serve in the Royal Danish Army, in which he became a Lieutenant of the Danish Royal Life Guards in 1959. In 1986 he was made a colonel and became the chief of the Planning and Operations Staff in the Defence Command. In 1990, he became a Major General, and Chief of the Army. In 1991, he was made head of the newly-created Army Operational Command. In 1993 he became Lieutenant General and head of NATO's BALTAP command, and was also head of the Defence Operational Forces. He held this position until his retirement in 1995, when he was awarded the Grand Cross of the Order of the Dannebrog.

=== Retirement ===
Since 2007, Hillingsø has been the Royal Patron for the Sankt Petri Schule and St. Peter's Church, Copenhagen.

Since his retirement, he has been a frequent commentator on topics such as the Cold War and the Iraq War, among others, in the Danish national newspaper Berlingske.

On 9 February 2000, Hillingsø was awarded the Estonian Order of the Cross of the Eagle, Third Class, by then-Estonian President Lennart Meri.

=== Personal life and family ===
Hillingsø married Ellen Birgitta Juel on 18 May 1963. They have two children together, Ellen Gunilla and Jens Georg.

Hillingsø's daughter Ellen is an actress, perhaps best known internationally for her roles in the television series The Bridge and Rita. Hillingsø's son, Jens, is the head of the Department of Paediatric Surgery at the Rigshospitalet in Copenhagen and former chairman of Médecins sans Frontières. His daughter, Olivia, is also starting a career in acting, following in her aunt's footsteps.

Hillingsø and his wife have been long-time friends of the Queen of Denmark, Margrethe II, and her late husband, Prince Henrik. Margrethe is godmother to Hillingsø's daughter, Ellen, and Birgitta Hillingsø is also godmother to Crown Prince Frederik of Denmark.

== Awards and decorations ==
=== Denmark ===
Order of the Dannebrog (Grand Cross)
Army Long Service Medal
Badge of Honour of the Reserve Officers Association of Denmark

=== Germany ===
Order of Merit of the Federal Republic of Germany (Class Unknown)

=== Estonia ===
Order of the Cross of the Eagle (3rd Class)

== Books ==
- Trusselsbilledet: En koldkriger taler ud. Copenhagen: Gyldendal 2004. ISBN 9788702042399.
- Landkrigen 1807. Copenhagen: Gyldendal, 2007. ISBN 9788702060041.
- Broderstrid: Danmark mod Sverige 1657-60. Copenhagen: Gyldendal 2009. ISBN 9788702078992.
- Generalens datter. with Ellen Hillingsø and Henriette Harris. Copenhagen: Lindhart & Ringhof. 2019. ISBN 9788711901946.
