= Danish nationalism =

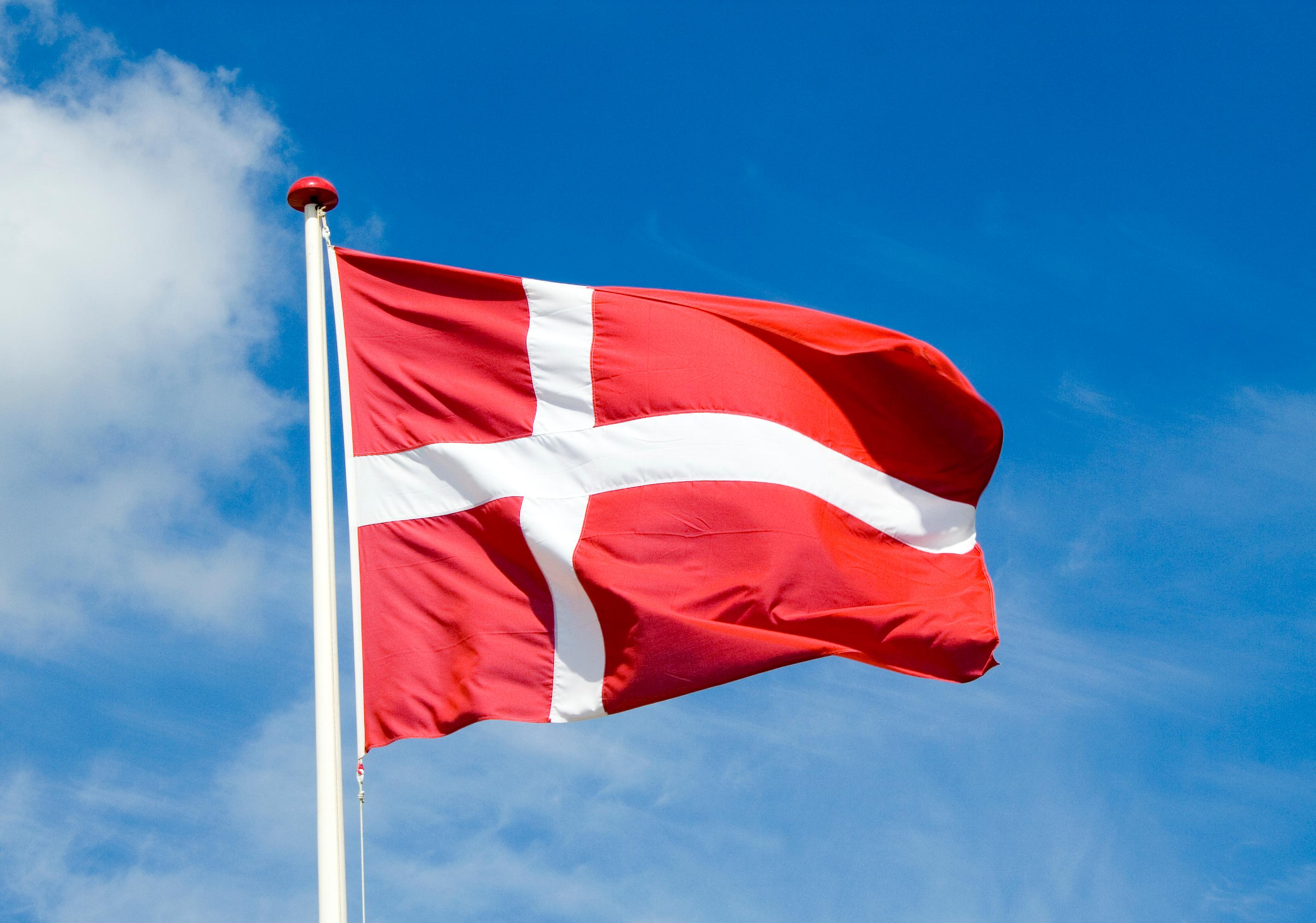
The Dannebrog

Danish nationalism (Danish: Dansk Nationalisme) is a political and cultural ideology that emphasizes the shared identity, language, history, and traditions of the Danish people.

== See also ==
- Politics of Denmark
- Racism in Denmark
