= Lise Baastrup =

Danish actress (born 1984)

- Born: 20 March 1984 (age 42); Silkeborg, Denmark
- Occupation: Actress
- Years active: 2010–present

Lise Baastrup Nielsen (born 20 March 1984) is a Danish actress best known for starring in the TV series Rita, as well as the title role in the television mini-series Hjørdis.

She was nominated for two Best Supporting Actress Awards. in 2011, Baastrup debuted in the dramedy television series Lykke (2011–2012). Lise Baastrup is a graduate of acting at Aarhus Theatre in 2010. After roles at Aarhus Theatre and Grønnegårdsteatret in Copenhagen, she was permanently employed at Aalborg Teater. She got her first major role on television in the series Rita.

== Filmography ==
Year	Film	Role	Notes
2011	Lykke	Forsvarer	TV series
2012	Almost Perfect	Klinikassistent	
2014	Speed Walking	Fru Simonsen	
2015	Hjørdis	Hjørdis	TV mini-series
2015	Badehotellet	Dagny Olsen	1 episode
2015	Rosita	Sussi	
2012–2020	Rita	Hjørdis	TV series
