= Alfred Schmidt (artist) =

Danish illustrator, caricaturist, and artist

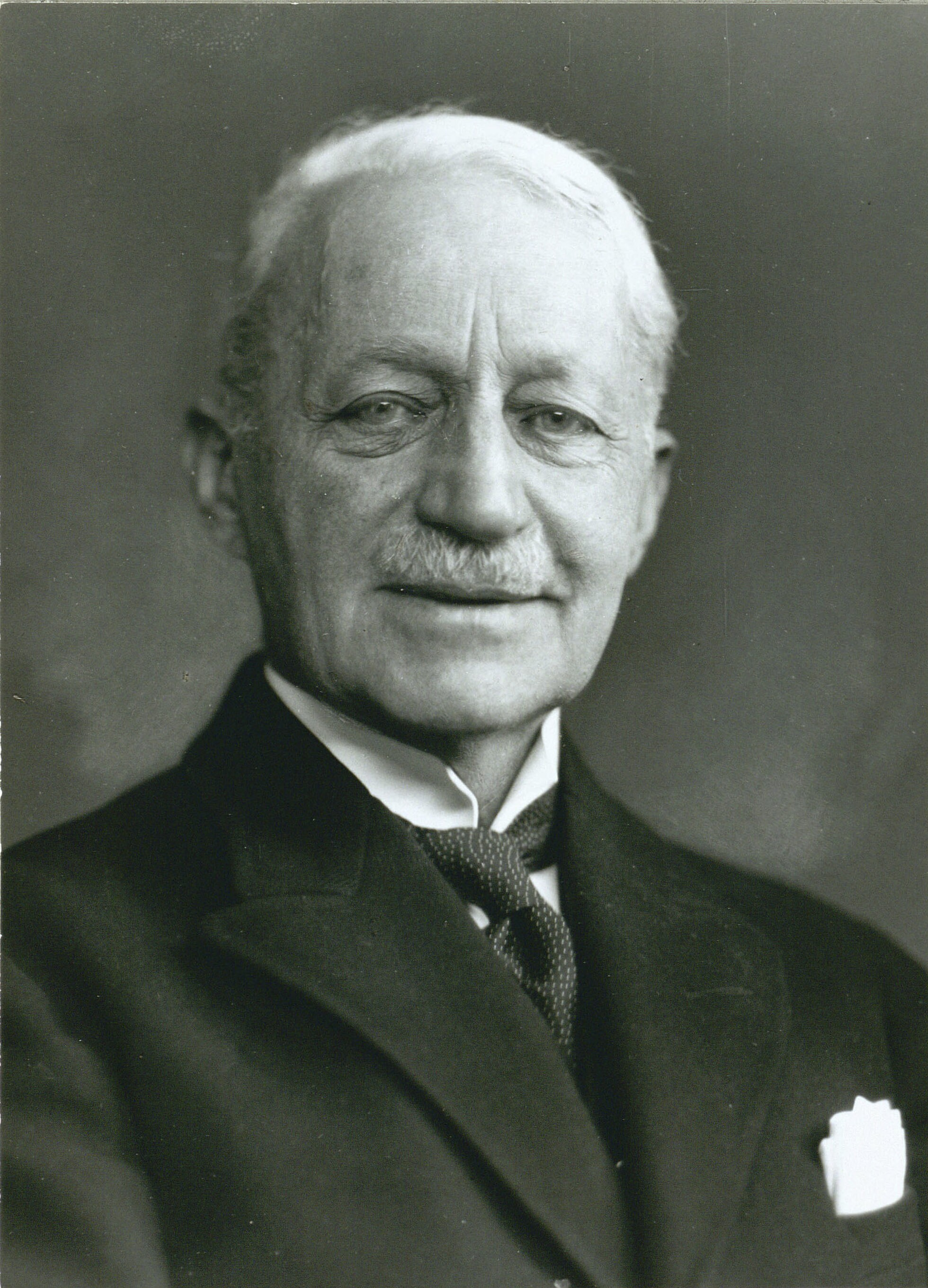
Alfred Schmidt

Alfred Michael Roedsted Schmidt (3 May 1858 – 4 April 1938) was a Danish illustrator, caricaturist and painter. He later became known primarily as a cartoonist.

== Biography ==
Alfred Schmidt was born at Horsens, Denmark. He received lessons from painter and drawing master Frederik Ferdinand Helsted (1809–1875) and later studied at the Royal Danish Academy of Fine Arts from 1874-1882. His art was featured at the Charlottenborg Spring Exhibition 1883-1886.

His ability to skew funny situations made him known and loved in broad circles. He was best known for his satirical drawings of politicians, including a recurring joke about Prime Minister J.C. Christensen being accompanied by a fox as illustration of this politician's cunning. He was main editor and contributor to the satirical magazine Klods-Hans (1899-1926). From 1880 he drew for Punch, Fliegende Blätte from 1884 and from 1889 for Blæksprutten.

He also illustrated books such as Christian Winther's picture book Flugten til Amerika (1900) and the later editions of Molbo story (molbohistorier).

He died at Hellerup in Gentofte and was buried at Garrison Cemetery, Copenhagen.

== Gallery ==
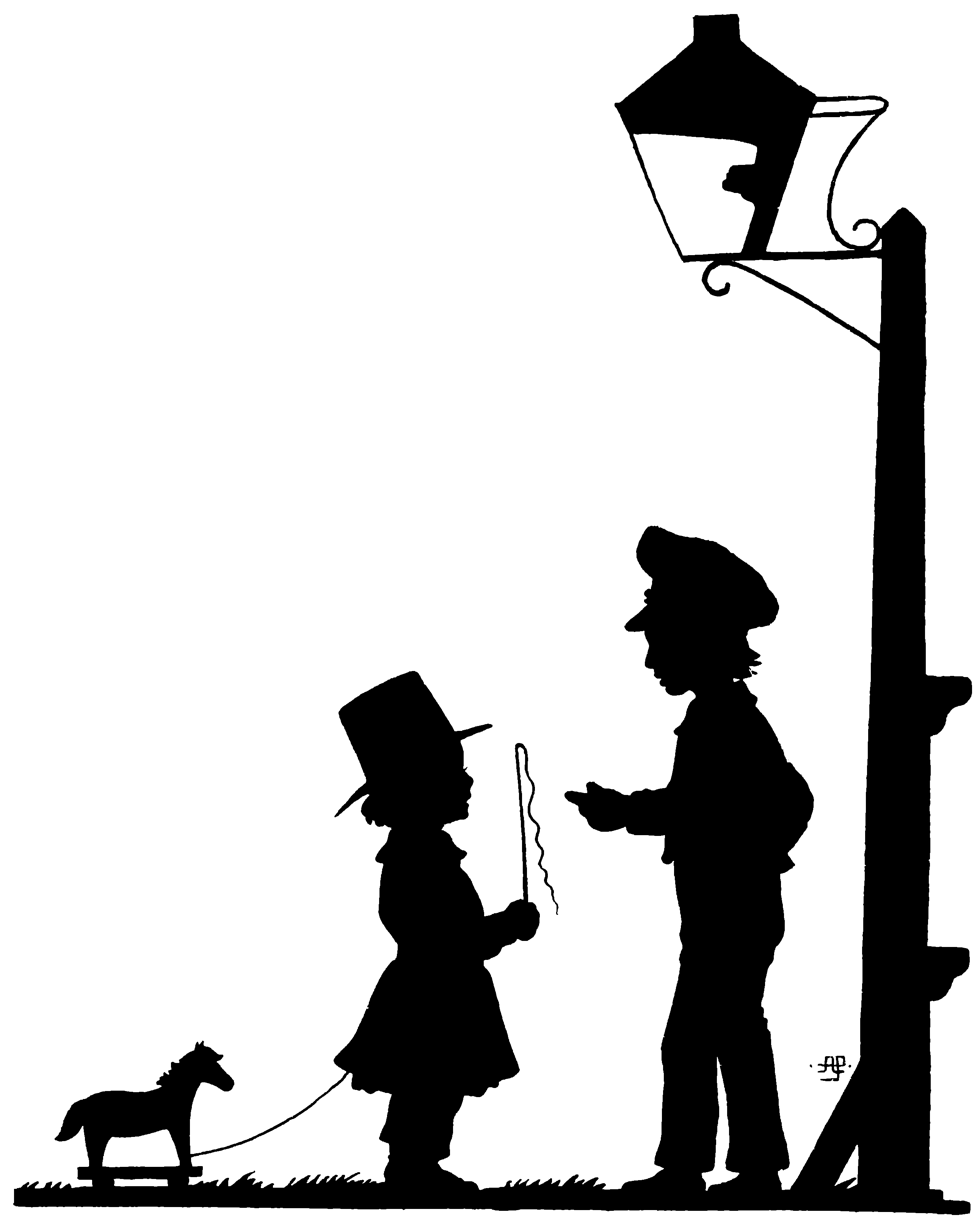
Illustration for Flugten til Amerika

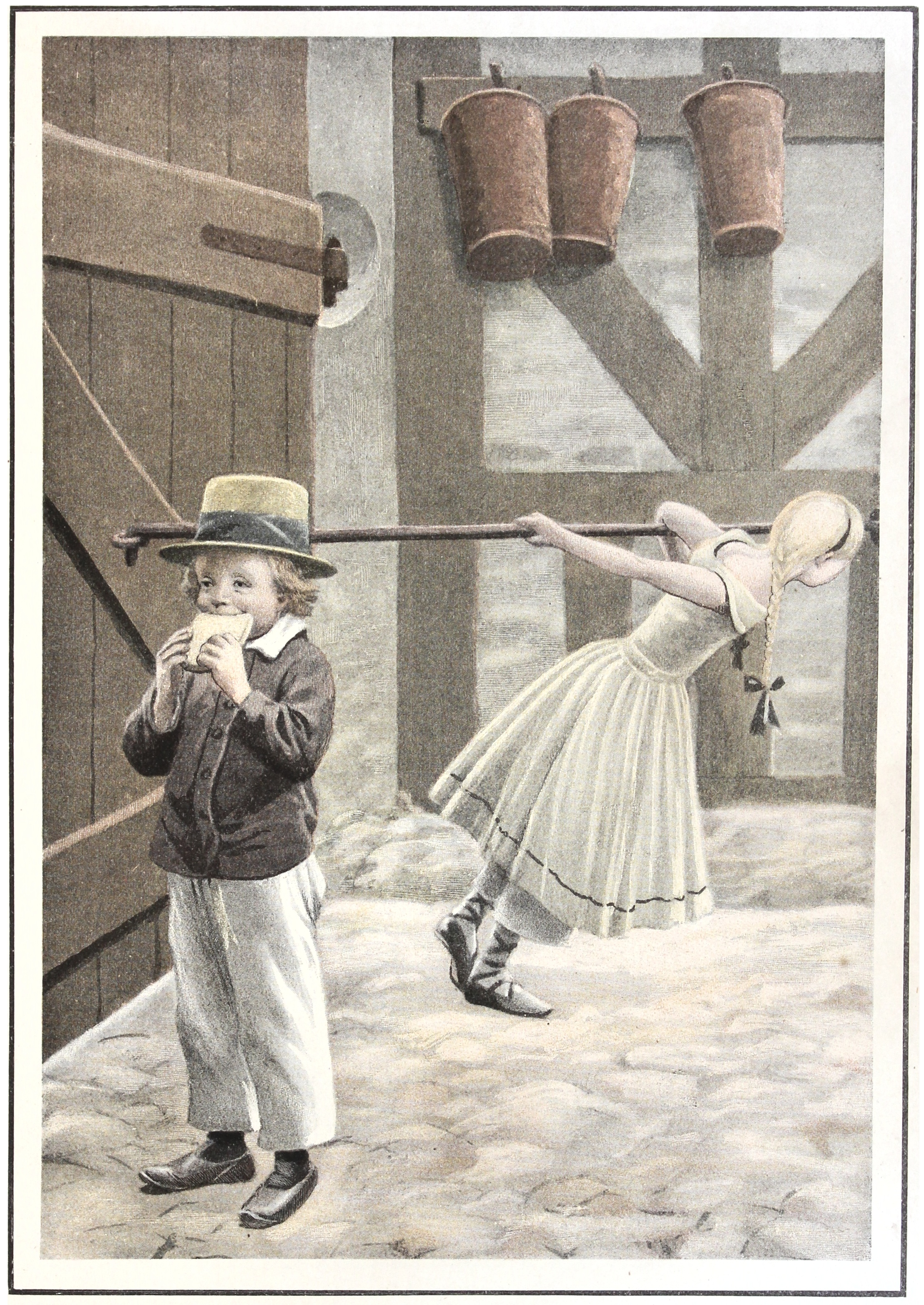
Illustration in Flugten til Amerika

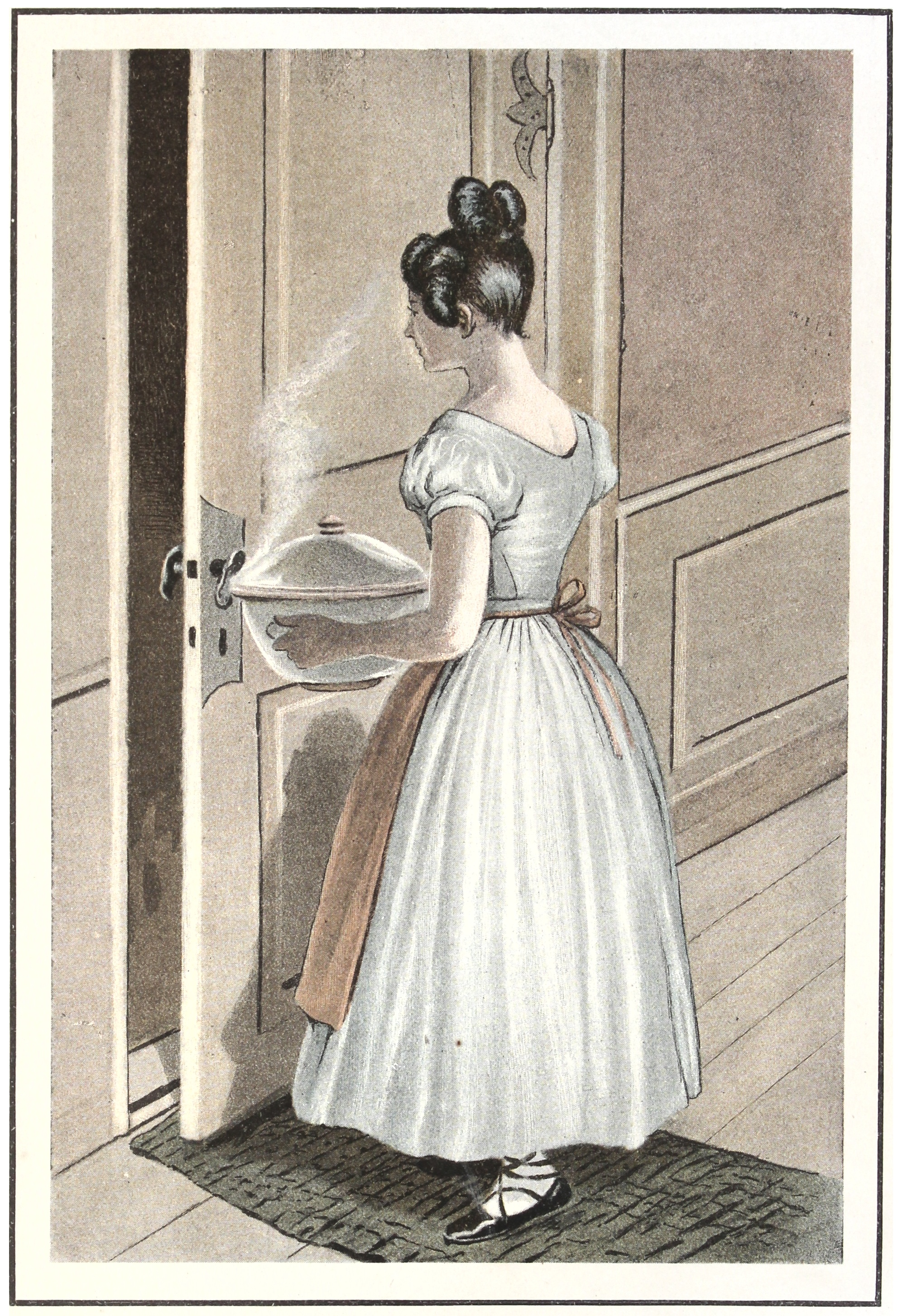
Illustration in Flugten til Amerika

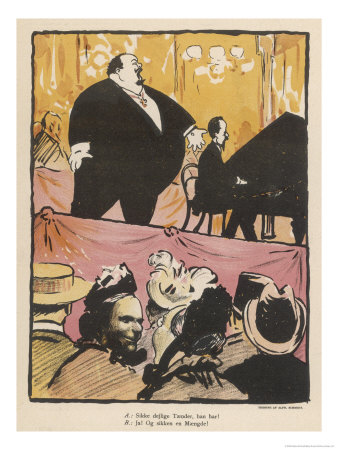
Caricature of an opera singer

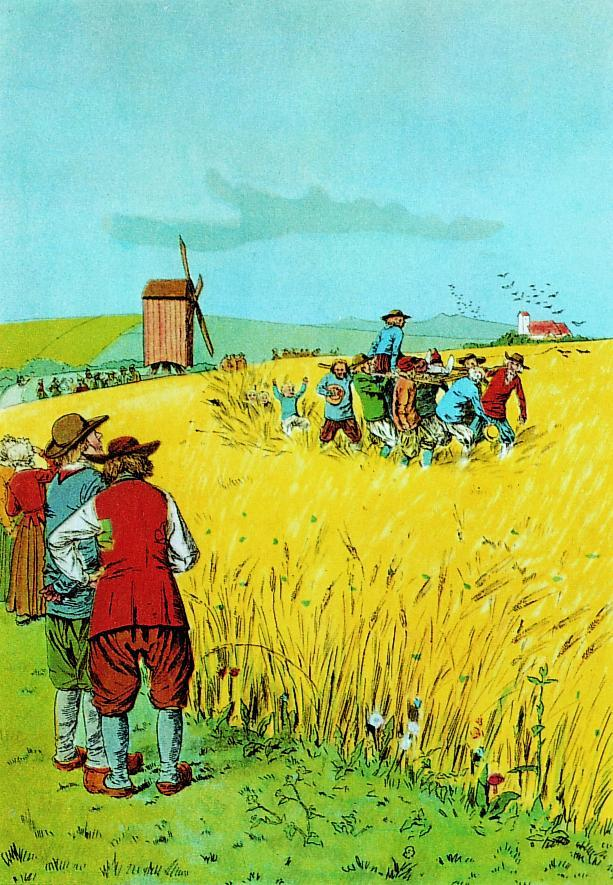
Illustration to a The Stork in the Corn, a Molbo story

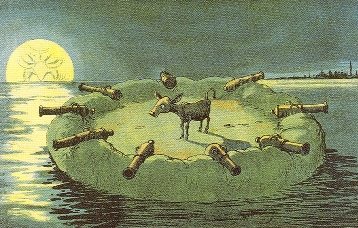
Caricature from Blæksprutten featuring fortified Saltholm (1904)

Racist cartoon for Klods-Hans (1917)

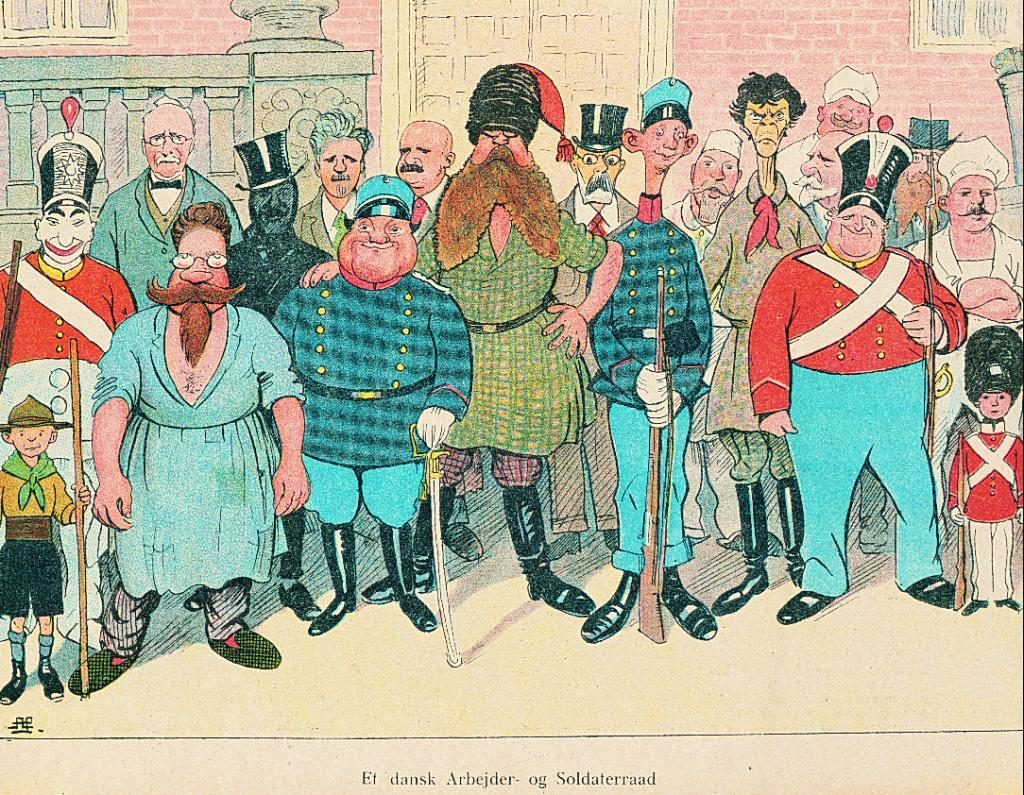
"A Danish Worker's and Soldiers' Council", Blæksprutten (1917)
