= Nukâka Coster-Waldau =

Greenlandic actress

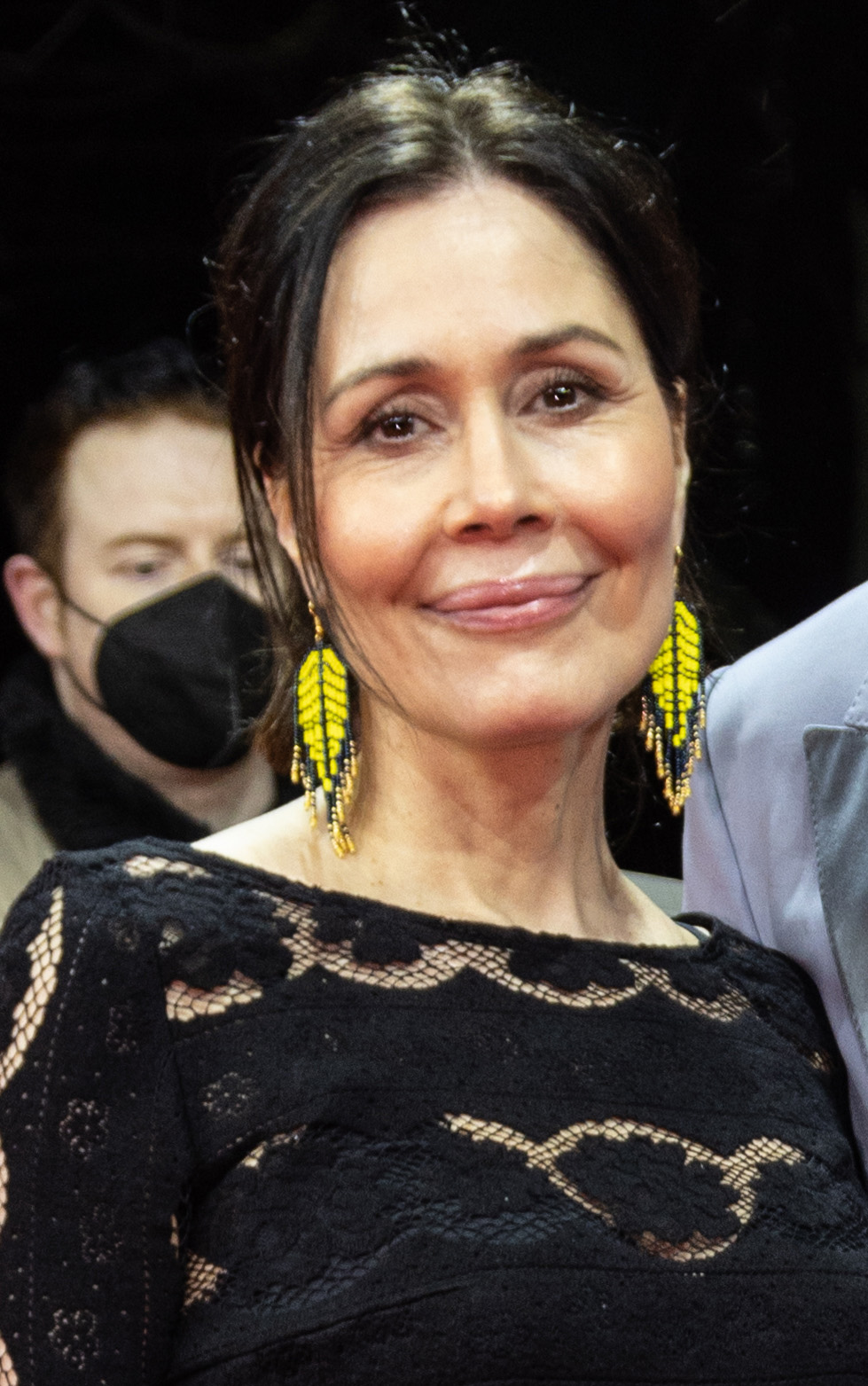
- Coster-Waldau in 2022
- Born: Sascha Nukâka Motzfeldt; 23 February 1971 (age 55); Uummannaq, County of Greenland, Denmark
- Occupations: Actress; singer
- Years active: 1998–present
- Spouse: Nikolaj Coster-Waldau (m. 1998)
- Children: 2
- Parents: Josef Motzfeldt (father); Vivi Motzfeldt (mother)

Nukâka Coster-Waldau (née Sascha Nukâka Motzfeldt; born 23 February 1971), better known professionally as Nukâka, is a Greenlandic actress and beauty pageant titleholder who won Miss Greenland. She is married to Danish actor Nikolaj Coster-Waldau and has two daughters with him.

Coster-Waldau is of Inuit, German and Norwegian descent and was born in Uummannaq, Greenland, Kingdom of Denmark. She is the daughter of Vivi and Josef Motzfeldt, a Greenlandic politician and government minister.

== International pageants ==
As Miss Greenland, Coster-Waldau (then named Nukâka Motzfeldt) participated in the 1990 Miss Universe Pageant, finishing in 19th place in the preliminaries, giving Greenland its highest placement at Miss Universe.

== Filmography ==
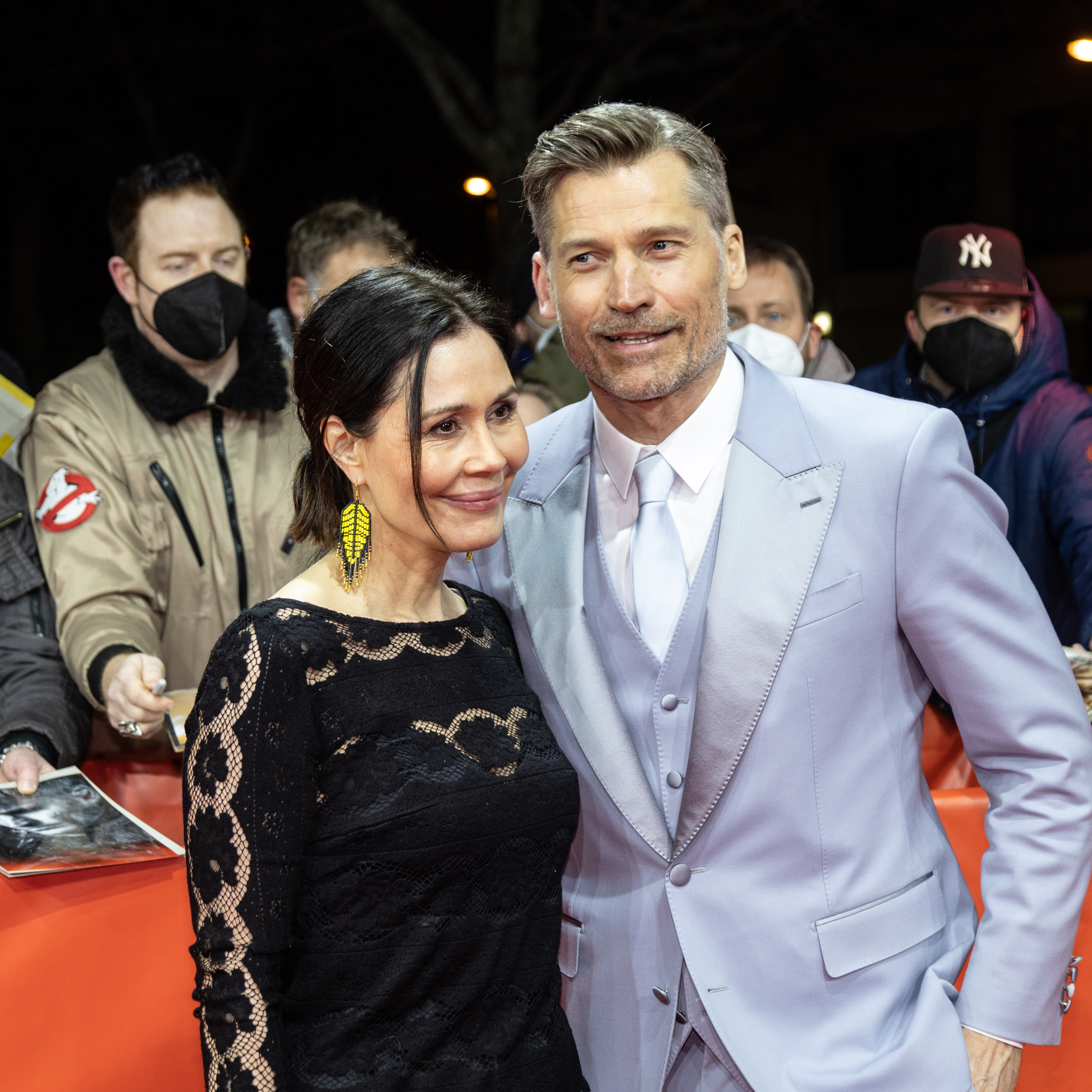
Coster-Waldau with her husband Nikolaj at the 72nd Berlin International Film Festival in 2022

=== Film ===
Year	Title	Role	Notes
1998	Heart of Light	Trommedanser	
1998	Vildspor	Jóna	
2007	White Night	Camillas veninde	
2008	Himmerland	Sofie's Mom	
2010	Eksperimentet	Margrethe	
2012	Skavengers	Airport Information Officer	
2013	Det grå guld	TV2 News Anchor	
2014	Sailor's Song	Sara	Short
2014	Echoes of a Ronin	Aiko	Short
2018	Anori	Anori	

=== Television ===
Year	Title	Role	Notes
2004	Forsvar	Sørine Olsen	Episode: "Det største offer"
2007	Forbrydelsen	Journalist	4 episodes
2010	Bedre sent end aldrig		
2020	Thin Ice	Ina Lynge	
2025	The Wheel of Time	Bair	Recurring role, 3rd season

=== Theatre ===
Year	Title	Role	Notes
2008	Polaroid		Stage
