= Holes in the Soup =

- Directed by: Povl Erik Carstensen
- Written by: Morten Lorentzen
- Edited by: Birger Larsen
- Release date: 30 September 1988
- Running time: 70 minutes
- Country: Denmark

Holes in the Soup (Danish: Huller i suppen) is a Danish comedy film released in 1988. A farce, it features comedians Morten Lorentzen and Povl Erik Carstensen as John and Aage. Lorentzen and Carstensen later recorded a live stand-up comedy version of the film, which they released on DVD, John & Aage - Huller I Suppen.

== Cast ==
- Morten Lorentzen as Host / John
- Povl Erik Carstensen as Host / Aage
- Arne Siemsen
- Joakim Solberg as Magician
- Jørn Boelsmand Nielsen
- Birgitte Ohsten Rasmussen
- Ellen Hillingsø
