= Eksperimentet =

- Directed by: Louise Friedberg
- Written by: Maj Rørbæk Damgaard; Louise Friedberg; Rikke De Fine Licht
- Produced by: Signe Leick Jensen; Birgitte Skov
- Starring: Ellen Hillingsø; Nukaaka Coster-Waldau
- Cinematography: Magnus Nordenhof Jønck
- Edited by: Martin Schade
- Music by: Ola Kvernberg
- Distributed by: Sandrew Metronome Filmdistribution A/S
- Release dates: 28 August 2010 (Greenland); 9 September 2010 (Denmark)
- Running time: 93 minutes
- Country: Denmark
- Language: Greenlandic

Eksperimentet (English: The Experiment) is a 2010 Danish drama film written and directed by Louise Friedberg, and starring Ellen Hillingsø. The film premiered on 28 August 2010 in the Katuaq Culture Centre in Nuuk, the capital of Greenland. The release date of the film in Denmark was 9 September 2010.

== Background ==
The film deals with the Little Danes experiment, a 1950s social experiment and the problem of cultural genocide in Greenland. In 1951 the Danish colonial authorities removed 22 Greenlandic Inuit children (9 girls and 13 boys), with dubious consent from their parents or guardians, from their homes, relocating them to Denmark for adoption and education. The selected children, aged between 6 and 8, came from disadvantaged families; the government planned for their adoption to integrate into the 'modern' Danish society with the aim of transforming the children into 'small Danes'.

Scene from the film: Karen (portrayed by Laura Skaarup Jensen) taken away from her parents by Nurse Gert (portrayed by Ellen Hillingsø)

The surviving children lost their native language and culture, and suffered from the psychological trauma of being separated from their families most of their lives. Some of the children were returned to Greenland after a year, where they were placed into an orphanage in Nuuk, rather than being returned to their families. Others stayed in Denmark for the remainder of their lives. More than half died before reaching adulthood.

In 2009, on behalf of the Government of Greenland (Greenlandic: Naalakkersuisut), the prime minister Kuupik Kleist demanded an official apology from Denmark for the failed social experiment. Lars Løkke Rasmussen, the prime minister of Denmark, refused, while admitting that the event was "unfortunate". His refusal leaves the issue of apology and compensation contentious between Greenland and Denmark.

In December 2020, the prime minister of Denmark, Mette Frederiksen, gave an apology.

The film's lead actress, Ellen Hillingsø, urged Rasmussen to apologize to the victims. In September 2010, Mimi Jakobsen, the general secretary of Save the Children (Danish: Red Barnet), the organization involved in the repatriations of 1951, issued a formal apology on behalf of the organization.

== Production ==
Director Louise Friedberg was inspired by reading I den bedste mening (2006) (With the Best Intentions), a memoir by Tine Bryld. A summary of the interview with Bryld was also released in 2006 as a 28-minute video under the same title. It was shown as part of Rethinking Nordic Colonialism, a Postcolonial Exhibition Project in the summer of 2006.

Between 13 and 21 July 2009, Friedberg shot scenes for the film in Kangeq, a former settlement on the coast of Labrador Sea in southwestern Greenland, located approximately 18 km (11 mi) west-south-west of Nuuk, at the mouth of Nuup Kangerlua, the longest fjord in southwestern Greenland. The old houses of Kangeq were used as a backdrop, as the settlement was to represent Nuuk in 1952. The city center had many communal apartment blocks developed in the 1960s, which changed its character.

The film was produced by Nimbus Film. It was one of six films in 2009 receiving government grants because of their importance for the culture of Greenland.

== Cast ==
The cast has both Danish and Greenlandic members:

Actor	Role
Ellen Hillingsø	Nurse Gert
Nukâka Coster-Waldau	Margrethe
Morten Grunwald	Omann
Laura Skaarup Jensen	Karen
Kurt Ravn	Svendsen
Laura Bro	Høgh
Mads Ville	Dr. Brandt
Finn Nielsen	Møller
Domilia Marianne Singertat	Marie
Paniaraq R. Søltoft	Ingrid
Najaaraq Margit Davidsen	Dorthe
Kristian Falck-Petersen	Daniel

== Reception ==
=== Premiere ===
The premiere of the film in Greenland was attended by the prime minister and Maliina Abelsen, the minister for social affairs. It was an emotional event, both because of the topic and because the issue of the official apology still unresolved. Several of the survivors are still alive. Eksperimentet is the first film dealing with the dark episodes from Greenland's history as a former colony. Others are likely to follow, stimulating more discussion and debate in the country, as well as in Denmark. The film was praised for its emotional appeal and acting. Critics thought the release dates in the summer may have limited the size of initial audiences.

== See also ==
- Minik Wallace
