= Hjørdis (TV series) =

- Genre: Comedy drama
- Created by: Christian Torpe
- Starring: Lise Baastrup; Ellen Hillingsø; Martin Brygmann
- Opening theme: "Nothing Like That" by Lise Baastrup
- Country of origin: Denmark
- Original language: Danish
- No. of seasons: 1
- No. of episodes: 4

Production
- Executive producer: Christian Torpe
- Producer: Jesper Morthorst
- Running time: 25 min
- Production company: SF Film Production

Original release
- Release: 18 May – 8 June 2015

Hjørdis is a spin-off of the Danish TV series Rita. It follows school teacher Hjørdis as she tries to put together a school play about bullying.

== Cast ==
Actor	Character
Lise Baastrup	Hjørdis
Ellen Hillingsø	Helle
Martin Brygmann	Gert
Robert Hansen	Anders
Pauli Ryberg	Einar
Jakob Fauerby	Secretary

== Episodes ==
No.	Danish title (English title)	Directed by	Written by	Original release date
1	"Gæsten" (The Guest)	Lars Kaalund	Christian Torpe	18 May 2015
2	"Gruppen" (The Group)	Lars Kaalund	Lars Kaalund	25 May 2015
3	"Prinsessen" (The Princess)	Lars Kaalund	Lars Kaalund	1 June 2015
4	"I rampelyset" (In the Spotlight)	Lars Kaalund	Christian Torpe	8 June 2015
