= Naja Lyberth =

Greenlandic psychologist and women's rights activist

- Born: 1962; Greenland
- Occupation(s): psychologist, women's rights activist
- Awards: 100 Women (BBC) (2022)

Naja Lyberth (born 1962) is a Greenlandic psychologist and women's rights activist known for her campaign against birth control policies called Danish Coil Campaign in Greenland for Inuit women without their consent. In December 2022, she was named as one of BBC's 100 Women.

== Biography ==
Lyberth is a practicing psychologist, trauma specialist and women's rights activist who works in Nuuk.

In 1976, at the age of 13, after a routine medical examination at school in Maniitsoq, a doctor asked Lyberth to go to the hospital for inserting intrauterine contraceptive device as a part of the birth control practice that affected about 4,500 Inuit women and girls in the 1960s and 1970s. In 2017, Lyberth was among the first people to publicly discuss the spiral campaign; she wrote on Facebook about her experiences. She also created a Facebook group to allow people to share their experiences and help each other cope with trauma. More than 70 women joined the group and some shared that they had problems, pain and complications in getting pregnant.

Lyberth said in 2022 that the coil campaign "stole" her virginity, caused her pain, may have caused complications for her later in life, and continued to traumatise her into adulthood. In December 2022, Lyberth was included in the 100 Women list by BBC.

In May 2023, the Danish Ministry of Interior and Health announced that it would open an inquiry into the forced contraceptive methods used in Greenland from the 1960s. It is scheduled for completion in May 2025.

In October 2023, Lyberth was among 67 women from Greenland who sent a letter to the Danish government seeking 300,000 kroner (around €40,000) compensation each for being subjects to involuntary birth control. She has said that "it's already 100% clear that the government has broken the law by violating our human rights and causing us serious harm" and that "we are getting older. The oldest of us, who had IUDs inserted in the 1960s, were born in the 1940s and are approaching 80. We want to act now."

In 2024, Lyberth was photographed by Juliette Pavy for her series Spiralkampagnen, which focused on the forced sterilisation of Inuit women in Greenland. Pavy was named as Photographer of the Year at the 2024 Sony World Photography Awards for her work on the project.
