= Godhavn inquiry =

2011 Danish child home abuse inquiry

The Godhavn inquiry was an investigation into child abuse in Danish children's homes between 1945 and 1976. After a documentary was released in 2005 alleging abuse in children's homes, a group of survivors lobbied for the Danish government to investigate their experiences. The inquiry began in 2009; while it initially investigated the conditions only of the Godhavn Boys' Home, it ultimately probed 18 others, and heard the testimony of 99 caregivers and staff. The report, which validated claims of forcible medication and poor treatment, was released on 9 May 2011.

== Background ==
In 2005, the documentary Drengehjemmet by Rikke Skov was released on Danish television. The documentary alleged that occupants of the Godhavn Boys' Home, a children's home run by the Danish government, were subjected to cruel living conditions. It suggested that a psychiatrist working at the home, Ib Ostenfeld, had tested drugs on the children; Bjørn Elmquist, a member for parliament, said one of these drugs was LSD, which was used to stop bedwetting.

Following the documentary, the Landsforeningen Godhavnsdrengene (National Association of the Godhavn's Boys) was formed. It lobbied for an investigation into their experiences.

== Inquiry and report ==
The government-funded inquiry into abuse at the Godhavn Boys' Home began in 2009, after several demands by the Godhavn boys. It investigated the Godhavn boys' allegations that they were subjected to neglect and medicating against their will. While the inquiry initially investigated only the Godhavn Boys' Home, it ultimately investigated 19 homes from 1945 to 1976. It included the testimony of 85 caregivers and 14 staff members of children's homes.

The report was published on 9 May 2011, concurrently with an exhibition for the Danish welfare museum. The report validated the claims of the Godhavn boys, saying residents of Danish children's homes were subjected to abuse and experimental medication, as well as saying the government had little control over the institutions. In the case of Godhavn Boys' Home, some 22 percent of the residents were given medication by Ostenfeld. These included antipsychotics, like thioridazine and flupentixol; and habit-forming drugs, like diazepam, chlordiazepoxide, and amphetamine. His most commonly used drug to treat bedwetting was the antipsychotic chlorprothixene, which was neither the standard drug of choice among child psychiatrists, nor was it supported by contemporary evidence. After subjecting the children to the treatment, he published his findings in medical research journals, including the Journal of the Danish Medical Association; in the 1960s, large-scale investigations into chlorprothixene for bedwetting were conducted, and general practitioners began to use it. His use of flupentixol preceded the first child experiment of the drug by almost a decade. The inquiry did not judge his actions illegal.

== Aftermath ==
After the report was published, Benedikte Kiær, the Danish minister for social affairs, refused to apologise. She said the "government cannot apologize for something that happened so many years ago", while also acknowledging that the report was accurate, and that the conditions of the children's homes were substandard. In response to Kiær's refusal to apologise in either her initial statements or in a parliamentary hearing, the Godhavn boys threatened to start a lawsuit against the government.

In 2019, the Danish prime minister, Mette Frederiksen, met with victims of abuse in Denmark's children's homes and apologised to them. Despite the publication of the report, there were no subsequent prosecutions related to the care provided in children's homes.

== See also ==
- Little Danes experiment – 1951 forced relocation of Greenlandic Inuit children to Danish families
- Legally fatherless – Danish laws denying some Greenlandic children the right to inherit from their Danish fathers
- Spiral case – an ongoing investigation into the forced sterilization of Greenlandic Inuit women during the 1960s and 1970s by Danish physicians, often without the women's consent and under the direction of government officials
- Forældrekompetenceundersøgelse – a Danish psychometric assessment of parental competence that has been characterized as discriminatory and racist when used on Greenlandic parents
