= Forældrekompetenceundersøgelse =

Danish parental psychometric assessment

Forældrekompetenceundersøgelse (FKU; lit. 'parental competence examination') is a set of Danish psychometric tests designed to assess the parental competence of those who have or are about to have a child or children. The FKU assessments often take several months to complete and are used when the relevant authorities in Denmark believe that a child, born or about to be born, is at risk of harm or neglect. The tests include interviews, general knowledge quizzes, cognitive tasks and personality tests such as the Rorschach test. Guidelines describing legal requirements, recommendations and good practice under the Child's Act (entered into force on January 1, 2024) are under the auspices of the Danish Authority of Social Services and Housing. The FKU tests are used in complex and serious cases. They are considered important as they are used to inform intrusive decisions such as the removal of children from their birth families, their placement in foster homes and their adoption. The test includes items such as the interpretation of facial expressions and abstract images, which differ culturally. The tests are administered in Danish. No interpreters are provided for those who, for example, speak Kalaallisut, the mother tongue of most Greenlanders. Results may thus be biased against parents who do not speak Danish as their mother tongue, since this may cause Danish mother tongue test administrators to judge test takers as having limited cognitive abilities.

== Application to Greenlanders ==
FKU competency testing of Greenlanders has been characterized as discriminatory and racist. The tests have contributed to the disproportionate placement of children with a Greenlandic ethnic background in foster care, with 1% of Danish children in Denmark being removed from their families compared to 5.6% of Greenlandic children in Denmark being removed.

In November 2024, people in Greenland demonstrated after a Greenlandic woman had her newborn child forcibly removed in Thisted Municipality. Demonstrators criticized the municipalities for forcibly removing children, based on an FKU test. According to the protesters, the test used parameters that did not take into account cultural differences. Subsequently, the Minister of Social Affairs, Sophie Hæstorp Andersen, urged the municipalities to drop the test when assessing whether children should be forcibly removed. Denmark announced in January 2025, that it would end the use of FKU with Greenlandic families although it is still used with other families in Denmark. The law was subsequently changed so that, from May 2025, the use of the FKU with Greenlandic families was banned and a specialist unit named VISO is to be used instead. However, protests occurred in August 2025 after another Greenlandic newborn child was removed from its Nuuk-born mother one hour after birth, subsequent to the mother's competency testing and contrary to the ban. An appeal against the removal was upheld in September 2025, paving the way for the baby's return. While social workers state that the decision to remove a newborn from its mother is not taken lightly, Greenlandic mothers are fighting to get their babies back. If a child taken from a Greenlandic family has been adopted, the birth family cannot have their case reviewed however. After six months of the government's promise to review by specialist panel the some 300 instances of children taken into foster care, ten cases had been reviewed. If and when all national avenues have been tried without success, it may be possible to take a case, of a child taken from a Greenlandic family into foster care, to the European Court of Human Rights.

== See also ==
- Godhavn inquiry – a 2011 Danish government inquiry into the conditions of children's homes between 1945 and 1976
- Little Danes experiment – 1951 forced relocation of Greenlandic Inuit children to Danish families
- Legally fatherless – Danish laws denying some Greenlandic children the right to inherit from their Danish fathers
- Racism in Denmark
- Spiral case – an ongoing investigation into the forced sterilization of Greenlandic Inuit women during the 1960s and 1970s by Danish physicians, often without the women's consent and under the direction of government officials
