= Karla's World =

- Directed by: Charlotte Sachs Bostrup
- Written by: Ina Bruhn
- Produced by: Thomas Heinesen; Kim Magnusson; Mikael Rieks
- Cinematography: Henrik Kristensen
- Edited by: Biger Møller Jensen
- Music by: Søren Bjerregaard-Ryan
- Distributed by: Nordisk Film
- Release date: November 9, 2007
- Running time: 90 minutes
- Country: Denmark
- Language: Danish

Karla's World (Danish: Karlas Kabale) is a 2007 Danish movie based on the 2003 book of the same title written by Renée Simonsen, the film is directed by Charlotte Sachs Bostrup.

== Cast ==
The cast includes:

- Elena Arndt-Jensen : Karlas
- Nikolaj Støvring Hansen : Mads Morten
- Jonathan Werner Juel : Lillebro
- Ellen Hillingsø : Rikke
- Nicolaj Kopernikus : Leif
