= Miss Greenland =

Beauty pageant

- Formation: 1991
- Type: Beauty pageant
- Headquarters: Nuuk
- Location: Greenland
- Members: Miss Universe; Miss World; Miss Grand International
- Official language: Greenlandic

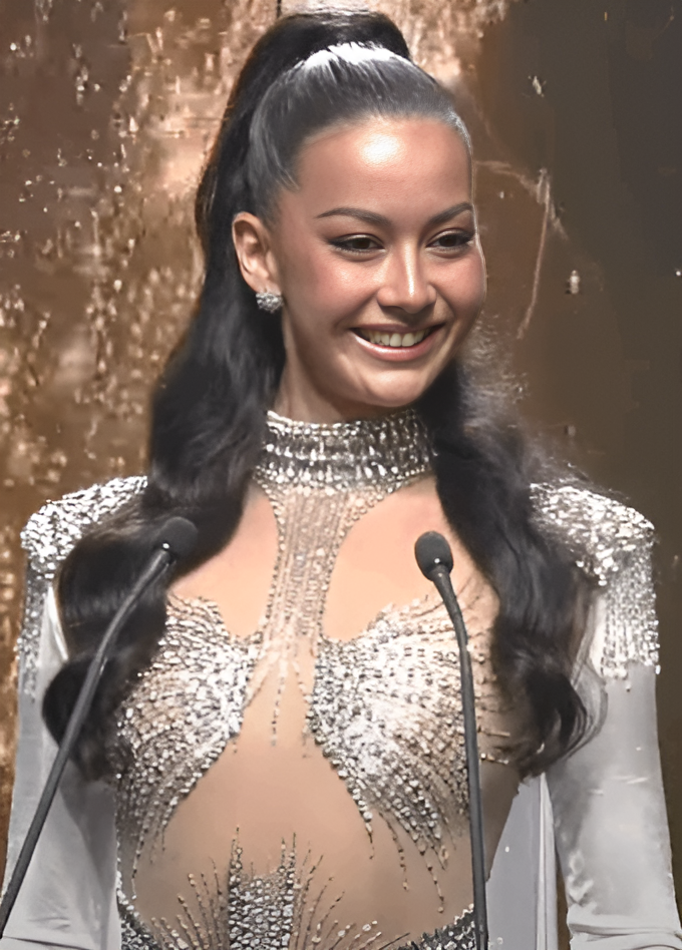
Naja Mathilde Rosing, the first Greenland representative to Miss Grand International in 2024.

Miss Greenland is a national beauty pageant in Greenland.

== History ==
For the years 1987 through 1990, Miss Greenland participated in the Miss Universe pageant. For 1991 and 1992, Miss Greenland participated in the Miss World pageant. Miss Greenland debuted for Miss Grand International pageant in 2024.

== Titleholders ==
=== Miss Universe ===
Color key

- Declared as Winner
- Ended as runner-up
- Ended as one of the finalists or semifinalists

Year	Miss Greenland	Placement	Special awards
1987	Susse Petersen	Unplaced	
1988	Nuno Nette Baadh	Unplaced	
1989	Naja Rie Sørensen	Unplaced	
1990	Nukâka Coster-Waldau	Unplaced	
Did not compete from 1991 to present

=== Miss World ===
Color key

- Declared as Winner
- Ended as runner-up
- Ended as one of the finalists or semifinalists

Year	Miss Greenland	Placement	Special awards
1991	Bibiane Holm	Unplaced	
1992	Laali Lyberth	Unplaced	
Did not compete between 1993 - 2012
2013	Dianne Illiansen	Did not compete	
2025			

=== Miss Grand International ===
Color key

- Declared as Winner
- Ended as runner-up
- Ended as one of the finalists or semifinalists

Year	Miss Greenland	Placement	Special awards
2024	Naja Mathilde Rosing	Unplaced	
