= Little Danes experiment =

1951 Greenlandic social experiment

The little Danes experiment, also known simply as the experiment (Danish: eksperimentet), was a 1951 Danish operation where 22 Greenlandic Inuit children (known as "experiment children"; Danish: eksperimentbørn) were sent to Danish foster families in an attempt to re-educate them as "little Danes". While the children were all supposed to be orphans, most were not. Six children were adopted while in Denmark, and sixteen returned to Greenland, only to be placed in Danish-speaking orphanages and never lived with their families again. Half of the children died in young adulthood and survivors experienced mental health disturbances. The government of Denmark officially apologised in 2020, after several years of demands from Greenlandic officials.

== Background ==
Following World War II, Danish government officials and non-governmental organisations believed Greenlandic society was underdeveloped and sought to redesign it. Together with the Red Cross and Save the Children, they manufactured an experiment to create a system where Greenlandic children would be brought to the Danish mainland, learn Danish, be fostered by Danish families, and then come back to Greenland as "little Danes": A population that was to become, according to the colonial studies researcher Claire Louise McLisky, the "new ruling class of Greenlanders". The children were supposed to be selected by Greenlandic priests according to certain criteria: Around six years old, without mental or physical impairments, and orphaned.

== Experiment ==
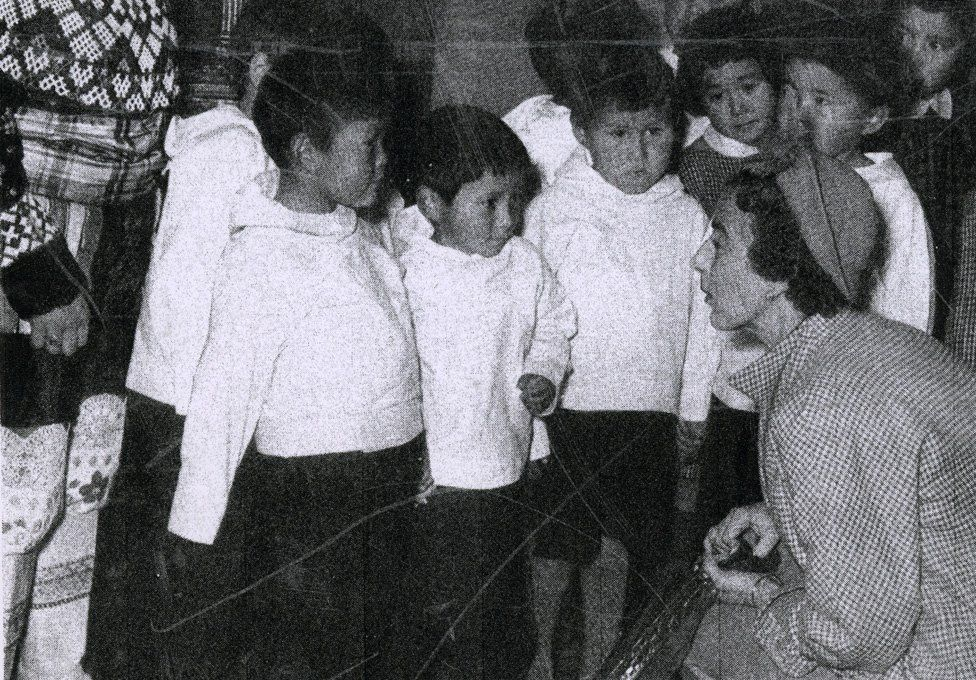
Queen Ingrid visiting Fedgaarden in 1951

Even though the participants selected were supposed to all be parentless and about six years old, priests could not find enough qualifying children. As a result, only six were orphans, and one child was nine years old when the experiment began. With the selections made, the MS Disko departed Nuuk in May 1951 carrying 22 Greenlandic Inuit children: thirteen boys and nine girls. They soon arrived in Copenhagen, Denmark—a country Helene Thiesen, one of the children, "had never previously heard of". (Note: Thiesen found the tree-filled landscape unfamiliar. She recalled in 2022 that "we don’t have any trees in Greenland, so I remember how tall and big they were".) After being moved to a so-called holiday camp at Fedgaarden, (Note: On the south side of the Feddet peninsula.) operated by Save the Children, they were immediately placed in quarantine over fears they carried contagious diseases. This quarantine lasted the whole of the summer; there, Thiesen broke out with eczema. The queen of Denmark, Ingrid, visited the camp and took pictures with the children. Thiesen said she "didn't understand a thing" of the queen's visit, and that her general unease of the experiment showed through in the photo, in which "none of us is smiling".

The children were then placed in Danish foster families for over a year. There, they learned the Danish language and forgot Kalaallisut. They were supposed to be sent back to Nuuk after about six months, but the construction of the orphanage by the program stalled, and over the course of their yearlong stay in Denmark, six of them were adopted by Danish families.

== Aftermath and apology ==
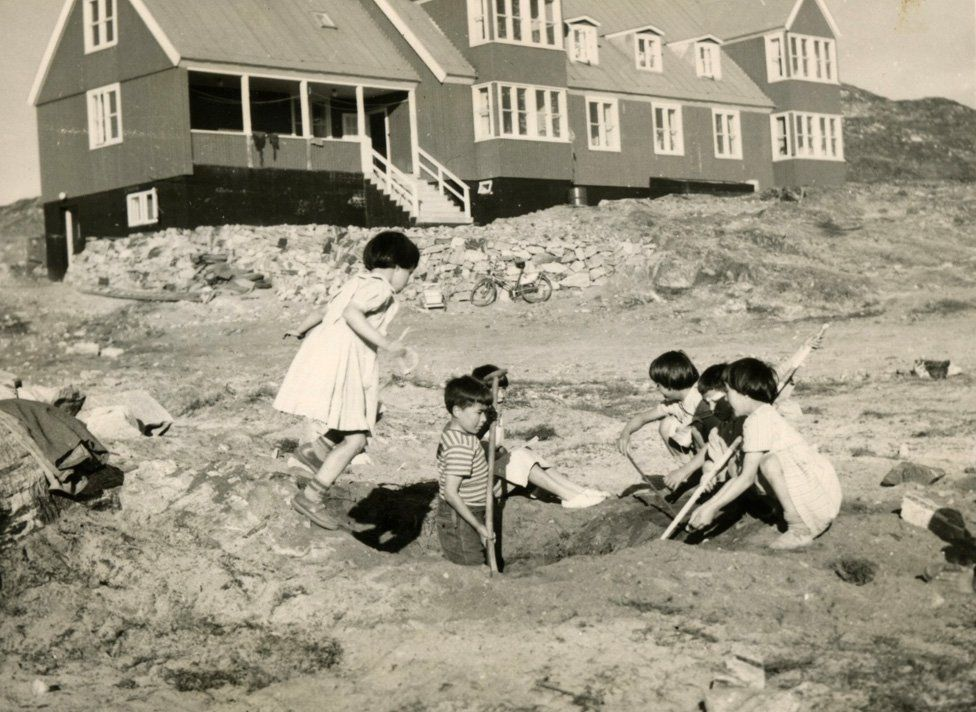
Children at the Greenlandic orphanage

Sixteen children returned to Greenland, while six were adopted by Danish families. Those who returned to Greenland were "top class" according to archival documents. None of them were to ever live with their families again, and even if they could, they could no longer speak the same language. They were placed into the orphanage, only permitted (alongside their Greenlandic Inuit staff) to speak Danish; this policy was to distill the "benefits" of Danish living to the children. By 1960, all of the children had vacated their orphanage, and sixteen of the 22 children lived outside of Greenland for most of their lives. About half of the children experienced mental health disturbances, substance abuse, and suicide attempts over the course of their lives, and half of the children died in young adulthood. They experienced extensive cultural isolation and social alienation, and Thiesen said they "lost their sense of purpose in life". Modified forms of the experiment were held in the 1960s and 1970s, where children would go to Denmark only for a short while, and then be returned to their families; these experiments also negatively affected the children.

In 1996, a Danish archivist told Thiesen for the first time that she was a participant in an experiment, and in 1998, the Danish Red Cross shared its "regret" for it. In 2009, the prime minister of Greenland, Kuupik Kleist, demanded an apology from the Danish government, saying the experiment is a "classic colonial case". The same demand was also made by the Social Democrats of Denmark, calling it a "black chapter" for the nation, alongside requests for an investigating commission of the experiment. (Note: This demand was made by the Social Democrats when they were in opposition to the sitting government. When they entered the government in 2011, they no longer pressed it.) Despite these calls, no apology was made by Lars Løkke Rasmussen, the prime minister of Denmark, who said instead: "History cannot be changed. The government regards the colonial period as a closed part of our shared history. We must be pleased with the fact that times have changed." Conversely, Save the Children apologised for the experiment, while also saying that they may have intentionally destroyed their documents relating to it; they apologised again in 2015, with the general secretary saying they "will never enter into a cooperation of this nature with the authorities". Just as Rasmussen refused to apologise, so too did following prime ministers of Denmark, and Helle Thorning-Schmidt declined to participate in an investigation. In 2019, two Greenlandic members of the Folketing made demands: Aaja Chemnitz (Inuit Ataqatigiit) demanded that an apology be made, and Ineqi Kielsen (Siumut) demanded that an investigating commission be made. As a result of Kielsen's request, Rasmussen agreed with Greenlandic prime minister Kim Kielsen to create a commission, though he again refused to make an apology.

The next year, after waiting for the commission's report, the government of Denmark and its prime minister, Mette Frederiksen, officially apologised for the little Danes experiment. There were only six surviving members of the experiment, among them Helene Thiesen, then 76 years old, who had been a proponent of officially recognising it. (Note: In 2011, Thiesen published a memoir, For flid og god opførsel (For diligence and good behavior), which focused on her time in the experiment. It was published by Milik, shortly after the release of Eksperimentet, a 2010 film about the experiment.) In December 2021, the survivors sued for 250,000 kroner (US$38,000) in compensation from Denmark for "violation of current Danish law and human rights"; Astrid Krag, the Danish minister for social affairs, said the government was "in dialogue" with their lawyers, though she stressed the most important aspect for Denmark "has been an official apology". In March 2022, the government announced that the six surviving experiment members will receive a face-to-face apology from the prime minister and their requested compensation of 250,000 kroner; Frederiksen traveled to Nuuk to apologise in a speech.

== See also ==
- Forældrekompetenceundersøgelse (FKU) - a Danish psychometric assessment of parental competence that has been characterised as discriminatory and racist when used on Greenlandic parents
- Godhavn inquiry – Report on child abuse and mistreatment in Danish children's homes between 1945 and 1976; in 2019, the government apologised in this case as well
- Legally fatherless – Danish laws regarding the legal paternity of the children of unwed Greenlandic women
- Spiral case – Investigation into 1960s and 1970s Greenlandic birth control program

== Notes and references ==
=== Bibliography ===
- Betak, Jens; Broberg, Hansigne (8 December 2020). "Eksperimentbarn: Undskyldning skal fejres med mattak og tørfisk" [Experiment child: Apology should be celebrated with muktuk and trout]. KNR (in Danish).
- Finnsson, Luna (14 August 2009). "Greenland demands apology for Danish child experiments". Ice News.
- John, Tara (14 January 2022). "How a failed social experiment in Denmark separated Inuit children from their families". CNN.
- Kristensen, Kassaaluk (15 March 2022). "Helene Thiesen: Forløsende undskyldning" [Helene Thiesen: Redemptive apology]. Sermitsiaq (in Danish).
- Larsen, Knud Fl. (18 March 2022). "Sådan var livet for Gabriel Schmidt efter eksperimentet" [Such was life for Gabriel Schmidt after the experiment]. Sermitsiaq (in Danish).
- McLisky, Claire Louise (2017). "The history and legacy of popular narratives about early colonial missions to Greenland and Australia". Journal of Social History. 50 (3): 534–554. doi:10.1093/jsh/shw043. ISSN 1527-1897.
- Minton, Stephen James; Thiesen, Helene (2020). "Greenland". In Minton, Stephen James (ed.). Residential schools and indigenous peoples: From genocide via education to the possibilities for process of truth, restitution, reconciliation, and reclamation. Routledge. doi:10.4324/9780429463044-5. ISBN 9781138615588. S2CID 241922631.
- Mørck, Astrid Helmer (8 December 2020). "Derfor gik eksperimentet med de grønlandske børn galt" [Then, the experiment with the Greenlandic children went wrong]. TV2 (in Danish).
- Murray, Adrienne (9 March 2022). "Lost lives of Greenland's Inuit children uprooted by Denmark". BBC News.
- Nonbo Andersen, Astrid (2020). "The Greenland Reconciliation Commission: Moving away from a legal framework". In Alfredsson, Gudmundur; Koivurova, Timo (eds.). The yearbook of polar law. Leiden: Koninklijke Brill NV. ISBN 9789004418745.
- Nonbo Andersen, Astrid (25 May 2021). "Et ambivalent opgør". Dansk Institut for Internationale Studier (in Danish).
- Otzen, Ellen (9 June 2015). "The children taken from home for a social experiment". BBC News.
- Poulsen, Regin Winther (20 December 2021). "Greenlanders shipped to Denmark as children seek compensation". Al Jazeera.
- Sørensen, Helle Nørrelund (28 February 2022). "Eksperimentbørn får 250.000 kroner i erstatning fra staten" [Experiment children receive DKK 250,000 in compensation from the state]. KNR (in Danish).
- Rud, Søren (2017). Colonialism in Greenland: Tradition, governance, and legacy. Palgrave Macmillan. ISBN 9783319461571.
- "Denmark apologises to children taken from Greenland in a 1950s social experiment". BBC News. 8 December 2020.
- "En personlig beretning af 'eksperimentet'" [A personal account of 'the experiment']. Sermitsiaq (in Danish). 25 March 2011.
