= Hugo Helmig =

Danish singer-songwriter (1998–2022)

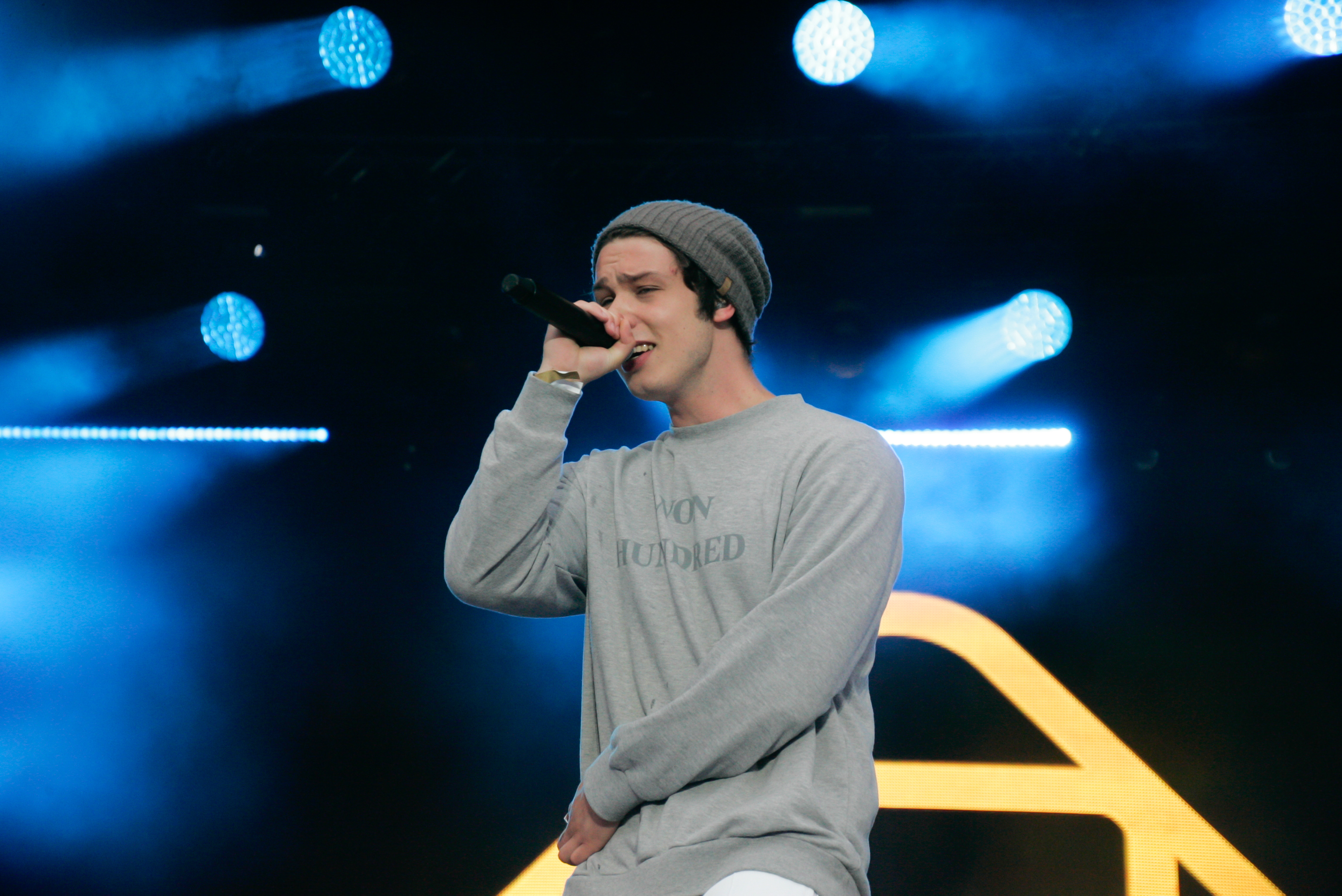
- Helmig performing at the Kieler Woche 2018
- Born: 24 July 1998; Aarhus, Denmark
- Died: 23 November 2022 (aged 24); Copenhagen, Denmark,
- Occupations: Singer, songwriter
- Years active: 2017–2021

Hugo Helmig (24 July 1998 – 23 November 2022) was a Danish singer-songwriter.

== Early life ==
Helmig grew up in Aarhus, the son of musician Thomas Helmig and supermodel Renée Simonsen. He had three siblings.

== Career ==
Helmig released his debut single, Please Don’t Lie in 2017, which peaked at number one on the Danish airplay chart and number three in Germany. The following year he released the single Wild which spent five weeks at number one in Denmark and charted elsewhere in Europe, including Germany.

On 2 July 2018 Hugo released the single "Wild" along with a music video on YouTube. That year, the track reached number 26 on the Danish singles chart and remained on the chart for three weeks. In 2019, the song was included in his debut album, Juvenile.

In February 2019, Helmig was signed internationally with AWAL, and later the same year he was nominated for a Music Moves Europe Talent Award.

According to the Danish Broadcasting Corporation, Helmig was the third most profitable Danish artist internationally in 2020.

== Death ==
On 23 November 2022, Helmig died at his apartment in Copenhagen, Denmark, at the age of 24. He was buried at Nordre Cemetery in his hometown of Aarhus. The cause of death has not been made public.

== Discography ==
=== Albums ===
Title	Year	Peak position (Denmark)	Weeks on chart	Certification	Notes
Juvenile	2019	11	4	Gold	Released: 1 March 2019

=== EPs ===
Title	Year	Peak position (Denmark)	Weeks on chart	Notes
Promise	2018	8	6	Released: 9 March 2018
LULU, Vol. 1	2020	—	—	Released: 27 March 2020

=== Singles ===
Title	Year	Peak position (Denmark)	Weeks on chart	Certification	Notes
Please Don’t Lie	2017	22	14	2× Platinum	Released: 9 June 2017
Wild	2018	26	3	Platinum	Released: 26 September 2018

=== Others Singles ===
- 2019: Young Like This (Gold)
- 2020: Curtains of My Life
- 2020: Sooner or Later
- 2020: Champagne Problems
- 2020: Tell Me to Stay (Gold)
- 2021: Wake Up
