= Juvenile (album) =

2019 debut album by Hugo Helmig

Studio album by Hugo Helmig
- Released: March 1, 2019
- Genre: Pop
- Language: English
- Label: The Bank Music
- Producer: Emil Falk

Hugo Helmig chronology
Promise (2018)	Juvenile (2019)	Lulu Vol. 1 (2020)

Singles from Juvenile
- 1. "Wild" Released: June 22, 2018; 2. "Young Like This" Released: January 4, 2019

Juvenile is the debut album by Danish singer-songwriter Hugo Helmig, released on March 1, 2019. It is Helmig's only full-length album before he ended his career in 2021 and died in 2022. The album includes two radio hits, "Wild" and "Young Like This", the former of which was certified platinum.

Juvenile was produced by Emil Falk, who also co-wrote all of the album's tracks.

The songs on the album revolve around, in Helmig's words,

being young and trying to make sense of life – and everything that comes with love. There are also songs about having fun without thinking about tomorrow, but also about the doubt and insecurity that follows.

== Track listing ==
Songwriting credits adapted from liner notes.
No.	Title	Writer(s)	Length
1.	"Don't Wait Up"	Emil Falk, Hugo Helmig Toft Simonsen, Sara Forsberg, Johan Tholin	3:24
2.	"Young Like This"	Falk, Simonsen	3:06
3.	"Please Don't Lie"	Falk, Simonsen	3:32
4.	"My Fault"	Falk, Simonsen, Daniella Binyamin	3:29
5.	"Posing For Pictures"	Falk, Simonsen	3:50
6.	"Wild"	Falk, Simonsen, Binyamin	3:30
7.	"Eyes Wide Shut"	Falk, Simonsen	3:32
8.	"Times of War"	Falk, Simonsen, Jacob Bellens	3:26
9.	"You Should Know"	Falk, Simonsen	4:03
10.	"One Plus One"	Falk, Simonsen, Nick Labajewska Madsen	3:08
11.	"Home"	Falk, Simonsen	4:41

== Critical reception ==
Juvenile received generally positive reviews from Danish music publications:

- GAFFA rated the album four out of six stars.
- Soundvenue gave it three out of six stars.
- Politiken awarded it three out of six hearts.
- Ekstra Bladet also rated it four out of six stars.

== Charts ==
Chart (2019)	Peak position
Denmark Albums (Hitlisten)	11
