= Birgitta Hillingsø =

Danish antiques dealer (born 1940)

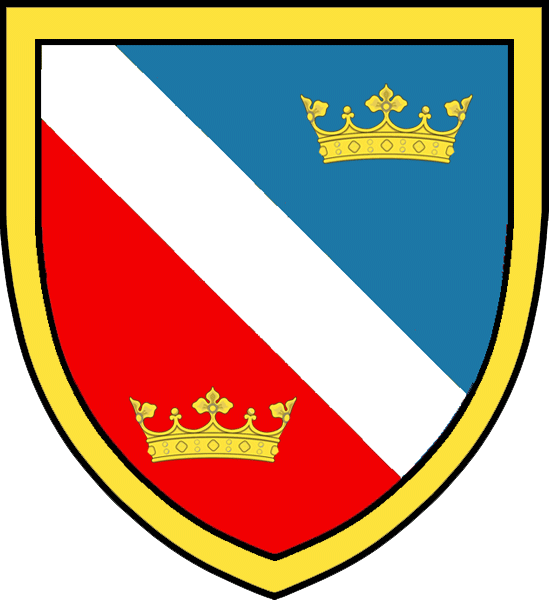
- Hillingsø's maternal Ankarcrona familial arms.
- Born: Ellen Birgitta Juel; 16 February 1940 (age 86); Funen, Denmark
- Education: N. Zahle's School
- Occupation: Antiques dealer
- Spouse: Kjeld Hillingsø (m. 1963)
- Children: 2; including Ellen Hillingsø
- Parent(s): Gregers Juel; Gunilla Ankarcrona

Ellen Birgitta Hillingsø (née Juel; born 16 February 1940) is a Danish antiques dealer. Hillingsø is the consultant in Denmark for the British auction house Christie's.

== Biography ==
=== Early life ===
Hillingsø was born Ellen Birgitta Juel on 16 February 1940 in Funen, Denmark to Gregers Juel, a chamberlain, and his second wife, Gunilla Hilma Inga Charlotta Ankarcrona, a member of the Swedish noble family Ankarcrona, born in Stockholm.

Hillingsø graduated from N. Zahle's School in Copenhagen in 1959. Queen Margrethe II of Denmark was one of her classmates.

=== Marriage and children ===
Birgitta married Danish general Kjeld Hillingsø on 18 May 1963. They have two children together, Ellen Gunilla and Jens Georg.

Hillingsø's daughter Ellen is an actress, perhaps best known internationally for her roles in the television series The Bridge and Rita. Hillingsø's son, Jens, is the head of the Department of Paediatric Surgery at the Rigshospitalet in Copenhagen and former chairman of Médecins Sans Frontières. His daughter, Olivia, is also starting a career in acting, following in her aunt's footsteps.

Hillingsø and her husband have been long-time good friends of the Queen of Denmark, Margrethe II, and her late husband, Prince Henrik. Birgitta is a godmother of King Frederik X of Denmark.
