= Renée Simonsen =

Danish former model (born 1965)

Renée Toft Simonsen (born 12 May 1965) is a Danish writer and former model. Simonsen was one of the most successful models in the world during the 1980s.

== Career ==
=== Modeling ===
In 1981 she caught the attention of fashion editor Birte Strandgaard, who convinced photographer Leif Nygaard to take some photos. Simonsen subsequently participated in the Ekstra Bladet contest and won second place. In July 1981, she appeared on the cover of the Danish magazine Fotokino. The following year she won the Ekstra Bladet Contest, and was chosen to represent Denmark at the Ford Supermodel contest, which she won in August 1982. In April 1983, she appeared in the American edition of Vogue; she subsequently went on to feature on four more American Vogue covers.

From 1983 on she became one of the fastest-rising stars in the modelling world, being featured on the covers of numerous international fashion magazines. She was the cover girl for the German Vogue in March, April and September of that year. That year, she was also featured on the cover of Roxy Music's Atlantic Years album.

In 1985, she debuted as an actress in Carlo Vanzina's Sotto il vestito niente (The Last Shot), released as Nothing Underneath in America, playing one of several models in Milan caught up in the rampage of a psychopathic murderer. In 1987, she worked again with Vanzina on the comedy Via Montenapoleone.

In 1988 she decided to take a break from fashion. Despite an offer to audition for the role of a Bond Girl in one of the upcoming James Bond films, the following year Simonsen ended her modeling career and returned to Denmark to study journalism. After failing the qualifying examination, she began to study psychology instead.

In 1991, she commenced working as a model again; intentionally for Vichy cosmetics. In 1993, Simonsen became the face of Biotherm cosmetics. Simonsen was the face of cosmetic brands such as Clarins, Maybelline, Covergirl and Lancel luggage. She also appeared in a swimsuit issue of Sports Illustrated magazine.

In 1997, she worked as a fashion editor for the Danish magazine Asschenfeldts Magasin, which, however, ceased operations after a few issues. In 2002 she completed her degree in psychology. In 2003 Simonsen signed a contract to the French cosmetic company Clarins and began appearing in magazine advertisements for mature skincare products.

=== Authorship ===
In October 2003 she published her first children's book, entitled Karlas kabale. In 2006 her children's book Anthony Greenwood was nominated for the Danish book-prize "Orla" and she was awarded with "The Most Dynamic Women" award by cosmetic company Clarins for her social engagement at Plan Denmark.

In August 2007, Simonsen released her first novel Tirsdag formiddag (Tuesday Morning). She followed this with a second adult novel "Dømt til Frihed"(Sentenced to Freedom) in 2010.

In October 2014 her biography was published in Denmark by Politikens Forlag. The book is written by Simonsen herself and journalist Andreas Fugl Thøgersen, while many others such as Eileen Ford, John Taylor, her parents, sisters, best friend, her husband Thomas Helmig and many others make a contribution to the book.

Simonsen continues to write a weekly column in the Danish Femina magazine.

== Personal life ==
Simonsen was born in Aarhus, where she worked as a supermarket cashier before her modeling potential was discovered.

From 1985 to 1989 she dated bass player John Taylor of the British band Duran Duran to whom she was engaged. Before breaking up with Taylor in 1989, she lived for four months in a Kibbutz in Israel with her sister, Heidi.

In the summer of 1997, she began a relationship with Danish rock singer Thomas Helmig, whom she married in August 2000. The two separated in 2014 but later reconciled. Renee has three children: two from a relationship with Kristian Sandvad: Ulrikke, born in 1993 (who is now an established model herself having appeared in the 2014 worldwide Magnum ice cream television advert), and Jens-Kristian, born in 1995 (also a model), and youngest Hugo with her husband, Thomas Helmig.

== Filmography ==
- Nothing Underneath (1985)
- Via Montenapoleone (1987)
