= Morten Lorentzen =

Danish comedian, actor and film director (born 1960)

- Born: 19 August 1960 (age 66); Denmark

Comedy career
- Years active: 1982–present

Morten Lorentzen (born 19 August 1960) is a Danish comedian, actor and film director. He is the son of the composer Bent Lorentzen. Appearing both on film and TV and as a live stand-up, he is best known for his role as John in the comic duo of John and Aage on TV 2, alongside Povl Erik Carstensen. He wrote the script and starred in the film Holes in the Soup in 1988 featuring John and Aage.

== Filmography ==
=== Film ===
- Midt om natten (1984)
- Huller i suppen (1988)
- Guldregn (1988)
- En verden til forskel (1989)
- De skrigende halse (1992)
- Hvid nat (2007)

=== TV ===
- Mor er major (1985)
- Guldregn (1986–1987)
- Gufol-mysteriet (1987, later rerun as Station 7-9-13)
- Rejseholdet (2000–2003) afsnit nr: 11
- Hotellet (2000–2002) afsnit nr: 11
- Jul På Vesterbro
