= Povl Erik Carstensen =

Danish comedian, actor and jazz double bassist

- Born: 8 June 1960 (age 66); Vangede, Copenhagen, Denmark

Comedy career
- Years active: 1982–present

Povl Erik Carstensen (born 8 June 1960 in Vangede) is a Danish comedian, actor and jazz double bassist. Appearing both on film and TV and as a live stand-up, he is best known for his role as Aage in the comic duo of John and Aage on TV 2, alongside Morten Lorentzen and for his work with Thomas Wivel. He directed and starred in the film Holes in the Soup in 1988 featuring John and Aage.

== Bibliography ==
- Etværelses med spisetoilet - En stand-up encyklopædi (1996)
- Historien om hvorfor dyrene siger, som de siger (1997)
- Ventetiden er gratis - En stand-up encyklopædi II (1998)
- Hvad enhver kvinde bør vide om mænd with Thomas Wivel (2005)
- Hvad enhver mand bør vide om kvinder with Thomas Wivel (2005)
- Hvordan man overlever sin kones graviditet – En guide til frustrerede mænd with Thomas Wivel (2006)
- Det mest pinlige - Danskere fortæller om sex om samliv with Thomas Wivel (2007)

== Filmography ==
- Huller i suppen (1988)
- Casanova (1990)
- De frigjorte (1993)
- Smukke dreng (1993)
- Næste skridt (2005)
