= Rita (TV series) =

Danish comedy-drama TV series

- Season 2 poster
- Genre: Comedy drama
- Created by: Christian Torpe
- Starring: Mille Dinesen; Lise Baastrup; Carsten Bjørnlund; Ellen Hillingsø; Nikolaj Groth; Morten Vang Simonsen; Sara Hjort Ditlevsen; Kristoffer Fabricius
- Opening theme: "Speak Out Now" by Oh Land
- Composers: Kristian Leth; Fridolin Nordsø
- Country of origin: Denmark
- Original language: Danish
- No. of seasons: 5
- No. of episodes: 40

Production
- Executive producers: Christian Torpe; Keld Reinicke; Karoline Leth; Lars Bjørn Hansen; Birdie Bjerregaard; Christian Rank; Jennifer Green
- Producers: Jesper Morthorst; Karoline Leth; Theis Nørgaard
- Production locations: Rødovre, Sjælland
- Cinematography: Kim Høgh; Rasmus Heise; Rasmus Arrildt; Bo Tengberg; Adam Jandrup; Niels A. Hansen; Brian Curt Petersen
- Camera setup: Single-camera
- Running time: 40 minutes
- Production companies: SF Studios; Netflix (season 3–5)

Original release
- Network: TV 2
- Release: 9 February 2012 – 20 July 2020

Rita is a Danish comedy-drama television series created by Christian Torpe for TV 2. It premiered in Denmark on 9 February 2012, and concluded on 20 July 2020, with 40 episodes broadcast over five seasons. Produced by SF Studios, the series was filmed in Rødovre, Zealand, and executive-produced by Keld Reinicke, Karoline Leth, Lars Bjørn Hansen, Birdie Bjerregaard, Christian Rank, Jennifer Green, and Torpe, who also served as head writer. All episodes are available internationally on streaming service Netflix , who partnered with TV 2 to produce the later three seasons, becoming a Netflix Original.

Mille Dinesen portrays the lead role of Rita Madsen, a headstrong and unconventional teacher and single mother who protects and helps her students but struggles to manage her own personal life.

A spin-off titled Hjørdis, centered on Rita's friend and colleague Hjørdis, (Lise Baastrup), was broadcast for one season between 18 May and 8 June 2015, consisting of four episodes.

Upon airing, Rita received generally favorable response from critics.

== Premise ==
Rita Madsen, a compulsive smoker, is an unconventional secondary education teacher who, according to her, chose this profession "to protect students from their parents". While she goes out of her way to advise and help her pupils, Rita's personal and family life seems to need the same kind of assistance. Her youngest son, Jeppe, is discovering his sexuality, while the older ones, Ricco and Molly, are experiencing the mishaps of adulthood. Other main characters include Hjørdis, a naive teacher who becomes Rita's best friend; Rasmus, the school headmaster with whom Rita has an on-again, off-again relationship; Helle, school counselor and Rita's former rival; Uffe, Hjørdis' husband; and Jonas, a former school headmaster who is a self-assured teacher at Rita's school.

== Cast and characters ==
=== Main ===
- Mille Dinesen as Rita Madsen, an unconventional teacher and single mother. Tessa Hoder portrays a young Rita in season 4
- Lise Baastrup as Hjørdis, a naive teacher and Rita's best friend.
- Carsten Bjørnlund as Rasmus (seasons 1–3 and 5), school headmaster in seasons 1-2, and on-again, off-again boyfriend with Rita and Helle
- Ellen Hillingsø as Helle (seasons 1–3; guest season 5), school counselor in seasons 1-3
- Nikolaj Groth as Jeppe Madsen (seasons 1–3 and 5, guest season 4), Rita's youngest son
- Morten Vang Simonsen as Ricco Madsen (seasons 1–2; guest season 3), Rita's oldest son
- Sara Hjort Ditlevsen as Molly Madsen (seasons 1; guest seasons 2–5), Rita's daughter
- Kristoffer Fabricius as Uffe (season 3-5, guest season 1-2), Hjørdis' boyfriend and, eventually, husband
- Charlotte Munck as Lea (season 4), Rita's childhood friend
- Ari Alexander as Ole (season 5), a farmhand and Jeppe's crush

=== Recurring ===
- Lisbet Lundquist as Lillebeth Schmidt Kronborg (season 1), Rita's mother
- Lykke Sand Michelsen as Bitten Dyrehave (seasons 1–2), Ricco's wife
- Carsten Nørgaard as Tom Dyrehave (seasons 1–2), Bitten's father and Rita's ex-boyfriend
- Lotte Andersen as Jette Dyrehave (seasons 1–2), Bitten's mother
- Elena Arndt-Jensen as Stine (seasons 1–2), student
- Lea Maria Høyer Stensnaes as Rosa (season 1), student
- Ferdinand Glad Bach as David (seasons 1–3), Jeppe's boyfriend
- Peter Gantzler as Niels Madsen (seasons 1–2, 5), Rita's ex-husband
- Alexandre Willaume as Jonas Poulsen (seasons 2–3), schoolteacher
- Tommy Kenter as Erik (season 2), schoolteacher
- Lasse Fogelstrøm as Mads Klitgaard (season 2), student
- Zaki Youssef as Said (season 3), Rita's crush
- Belal Faiz as Karim (season 3), student and Said's brother
- Frederik Winther Rasmussen as Niklas Verner (season 3), student
- Charlotte Fich as Alice Verner (season 3), Niklas' mother and city mayor
- Ole Lemmeke as Bjarne (season 4), headmaster
- Tessa Hoder as young Rita (season 4)
- Sofie Juul as young Lea (season 4)
- Olaf Højgaard as Martin (season 4), Lea's husband
- Albert Reffelt Dalum as Allan (season 4), Lea and Martin's son
- Christine Exner as Susanne (season 4), Lea's mother and Rita's teacher in 1985
- Kurt Ravn as Rostrup (season 4), Rita's teacher in 1985
- Rosa Sand Michelsen as Kalinka (season 4–5), schoolteacher, mother of Knud, married to Niels
- Søren Bang Jensen as Niels (season 4–5), schoolteacher, father of Knud, married to Kalinka
- William Friis Nelausen as Reinulf (seasons 4–5), Hjørdis' and Uffe's son
- Søs Egelind as Gerd (season 5), Rita's student

=== Guest ===
- Line Kruse as Gitte Nielsen (season 1), Rita's sister
- Laura Bach as Gitte Nielsen (season 2), Rita's sister
- Kristian Halken as Flemming (season 2), teacher
- Nikolaj Dencker Schmidt as Alex (season 5), Jeppe's boyfriend
- Lisbeth Dahl as Gudrun (season 5), Ole's grandmother

== Episodes ==
=== Series overview ===
Series	Episodes	Originally released	
Series	Episodes	First released	Last released
1	8	9 February 2012	29 March 2012
2	8	11 September 2013	30 October 2013
3	8	23 March 2015	11 May 2015
4	8	21 August 2017	9 October 2017
5	8	1 June 2020	20 July 2020

=== Season 1 (2012) ===
No. overall	No. in season	Title	Directed by	Written by	Original release date	Danish viewers (millions)
1	1	"Idealisten" "The Idealist"	Lars Kaalund	Christian Torpe	9 February 2012	0.90
2	2	"Læreren" "The Teacher"	Lars Kaalund	Christian Torpe	16 February 2012	0.81
3	3	"Anarkisten" "The Anarchist"	Lars Kaalund	Christian Torpe	23 February 2012	0.88
4	4	"Hun-ulven" "The She-Wolf"	Jannik Johansen	Christian Torpe	1 March 2012	0.89
5	5	"Beskytteren" "The Protector"	Jannik Johansen	Marie Østerbye & Christian Torpe	8 March 2012	0.85
6	6	"Hykleren" "The Hypocrite"	Jannik Johansen	Christian Torpe	15 March 2012	0.79
7	7	"Prinsessen" "The Princess"	Lars Kaalund	Marie Østerbye & Christian Torpe	22 March 2012	0.80
8	8	"Moderen" "The Mother"	Lars Kaalund	Christian Torpe	29 March 2012	0.80

=== Season 2 (2013) ===
No. overall	No. in season	Title	Directed by	Written by	Original release date	Danish viewers (millions)
9	1	"Den voksne" "The Adult"	Lars Kaalund	Christian Torpe	11 September 2013	0.65
10	2	"Haven" "The Garden"	Lars Kaalund	Thomas Levin & Christian Torpe & Christina Sederqvist	18 September 2013	0.75
11	3	"Far, mor og børn" "Father, Mother and Child"	Lars Kaalund	Christian Torpe & Marie Østerbye	25 September 2013	0.72
12	4	"Teamplayer" "Team Player"	Kathrine Windfeld	Mette Heeno	2 October 2013	0.79
13	5	"Jeg elsker dig" "I Love You"	Kathrine Windfeld	Marie Østerbye	9 October 2013	0.76
14	6	"Den første kærlighed" "The First Love"	Kathrine Windfeld	Marie Østerbye	16 October 2013	0.69
15	7	"Rollemodellen" "The Role Model"	Lars Kaalund	Stefan Jaworski & Christoffer Örnfelt	23 October 2013	0.75
16	8	"Ukrudt" "The Weeds"	Lars Kaalund	Christian Torpe & Marie Østerbye	30 October 2013	0.73

=== Season 3 (2015) ===
No. overall	No. in season	Title	Directed by	Written by	Original release date	Danish viewers (millions)
17	1	"Kandidaten" "The Candidate"	Lars Kaalund	Christian Torpe & Marie Østerbye	23 March 2015	0.80
18	2	"Kælderen" "The Basement"	Lars Kaalund	Christian Torpe & Marie Østerbye	23 March 2015	0.87
19	3	"Sponsorbarnet" "The Sponsor Child"	Lars Kaalund	Christian Torpe & Marie Østerbye & Simon Odid Weil	30 March 2015	0.70
20	4	"Aftenskole" "Evening School"	Lars Kaalund	Christian Torpe & Marie Østerbye	6 April 2015	0.77
21	5	"Lus" "Lice"	Lars Kaalund	Christian Torpe & Simon Odid Weil	13 April 2015	0.76
22	6	"Frit fald" "Freefall"	Mogens Hagedorn	Christian Torpe & Jenny Lund Madsen	20 April 2015	0.76
23	7	"Lederen" "The Head"	Mogens Hagedorn	Christian Torpe & Marie Østerbye	27 April 2015	0.72
24	8	"Testen" "The Test"	Mogens Hagedorn	Christian Torpe	11 May 2015	0.74

=== Season 4 (2017) ===
No. overall	No. in season	Title	Directed by	Written by	Original release date	Danish viewers (millions)
25	1	"Nutid/datid" "Present/past"	Lars Kaalund	Christian Torpe & Jannik Tai Mosholt	21 August 2017	0.77
26	2	"Du bliver, hvad du spiser" "You Become What You Eat"	Lars Kaalund	Christian Torpe & Jannik Tai Mosholt	28 August 2017	0.68
27	3	"Tøbrud" "Thaw"	Lars Kaalund	Christian Torpe, Jannik Tai Mosholt & Simon Oded Weil	4 September 2017	0.56
28	4	"Rigtige Venner" "Real Friends"	Natasha Arthy	Jannik Tai Mosholt, Christian Torpe & Jenny Lund Madsen	11 September 2017	0.66
29	5	"Dig og mig" "You and I"	Natasha Arthy	Jannik Tai Mosholt, Christian Torpe & Ina Bruhn	18 September 2017	0.60
30	6	"Barndommens gade" "Childhood Streets"	Lars Kaalund	Jannik Tai Mosholt, Christian Torpe & Simon Oded Weil	25 September 2017	0.59
31	7	"Familie" "Family"	Lars Kaalund	Jannik Tai Mosholt, Christian Torpe & Ina Bruhn	2 October 2017	0.63
32	8	"Hjemme" "Home"	Lars Kaalund	Jannik Tai Mosholt, Christian Torpe & Marie Østerbye	9 October 2017	0.63

=== Season 5 (2020) ===
No. overall	No. in season	Title	Directed by	Original release date	Danish viewers (millions)
33	1	"Fake News" "Fake News"	Lars Kaalund	1 June 2020	0.76
34	2	"Hurlumhejhus" "Hullabaloo House"	Lars Kaalund	8 June 2020	0.62
35	3	"Udflugten" "The Outing"	Lars Kaalund	15 June 2020	0.48
36	4	"Do You Speak English?" "Do You Speak English?"	Lars Kaalund	22 June 2020	0.56
37	5	"Hedetur" "Hot Flash"	Lars Kaalund	29 June 2020	0.56
38	6	"Grænser" "Boundaries"	Lars Kaalund	6 July 2020	0.53
39	7	"Søen" "The Lake"	Lars Kaalund	13 July 2020	0.44
40	8	"Kaos" "Chaos"	Lars Kaalund	20 July 2020	0.44

== Reception ==
=== Critical response ===
Henrik Palle wrote for Politiken that the series "works really well with some characters who actually look like people".

=== Awards and nominations ===
Award ceremony	Year	Category	Recipient(s)	Result	Reference(s)
Monte-Carlo Television Festival	2012	Outstanding Actress in a Drama Series	Mille Dinesen	Won	
Monte-Carlo Television Festival	2012	Outstanding Actress in a Drama Series	Lise Baastrup	Nominated	
Monte-Carlo Television Festival	2012	Outstanding International Producer (Drama Series)	Christian Torpe (executive producer) and SF Studios (production company)	Nominated	
Monte-Carlo Television Festival	2012	Outstanding European Producer (Drama Series)	Christian Torpe (executive producer) and SF Studios (production company)	Nominated	
Monte-Carlo Television Festival	2012	Outstanding Actor in a Drama Series	Carsten Bjørnlund	Nominated	
Monte-Carlo Television Festival	2012	Outstanding Actor in a Drama Series	Nikolaj Groth	Nominated	
Robert Awards	2013	Best Danish Television Series	Rita	Nominated	
Robert Awards	2013	Best Actress in a Leading Television Role	Mille Dinesen	Nominated	
Robert Awards	2013	Best Actor in a Leading Television Role	Carsten Bjørnlund	Nominated	
Robert Awards	2013	Best Actress in a Supporting Television Role	Sara Hjort Ditlevsen	Nominated	
Robert Awards	2013	Best Actor in a Supporting Television Role	Nikolaj Groth	Nominated	
Monte-Carlo Television Festival	2014	Outstanding Actor in a Drama Series	Carsten Bjørnlund	Nominated	
Monte-Carlo Television Festival	2014	Outstanding Actress in a Drama Series	Mille Dinesen	Nominated	
Zulu Awards	2014	Best Actress	Mille Dinesen	Won	
Zulu Awards	2016	Best TV Series	Rita	Nominated	
Robert Awards	2016	Best Danish Television Series	Rita	Nominated	
Robert Awards	2016	Best Actress in a Leading Television Role	Mille Dinesen	Nominated	
Robert Awards	2016	Best Supporting Actress in a Leading Television Role	Lise Baastrup	Nominated	
Robert Awards	2016	Best Supporting Actor in a Leading Television Role	Carsten Bjørnlund	Nominated	
Robert Awards	2018	Best Danish Television Series	Rita	Nominated	
Robert Awards	2018	Best Actress in a Leading Television Role	Mille Dinesen	Nominated	
Robert Awards	2018	Best Supporting Actress in a Leading Television Role	Charlotte Munck	Nominated	
Copenhagen TV Festival	2021	Best Television Series	Rita	Won	

== Related media ==
=== Spin-off ===
Hjørdis follows the eponymous teacher as she tries to put together a school play about bullying. It was broadcast between 18 May and 8 June 2015, consisting of four episodes.

=== Adaptations ===
A US remake was planned with a pilot episode filmed in 2013, starring Anna Gunn, but it was not picked up as a series. In 2019, American premium cable network Showtime commissioned a pilot order for a remake starring Lena Headey. The series was to be a joint production between Showtime Networks and Platform One Media, with Torpe serving as showrunner and writing the pilot episode and Headey also acting as executive producer. This pilot was not picked up for a full series either.

A Dutch remake, Tessa, which began airing in November 2015 on NPO 1, lasted only one season. The lead role was played by Thekla Reuten, following the storyline of Rita Season one, with only a few changes. The series was remade in France by TF1 as Sam, starring Mathilde Seigner in the title role for the first season. The second season of Sam entered production in 2017 with Natacha Lindinger replacing Seigner in the title role. The show has aired seven seasons to date.
