= Racism in Denmark =

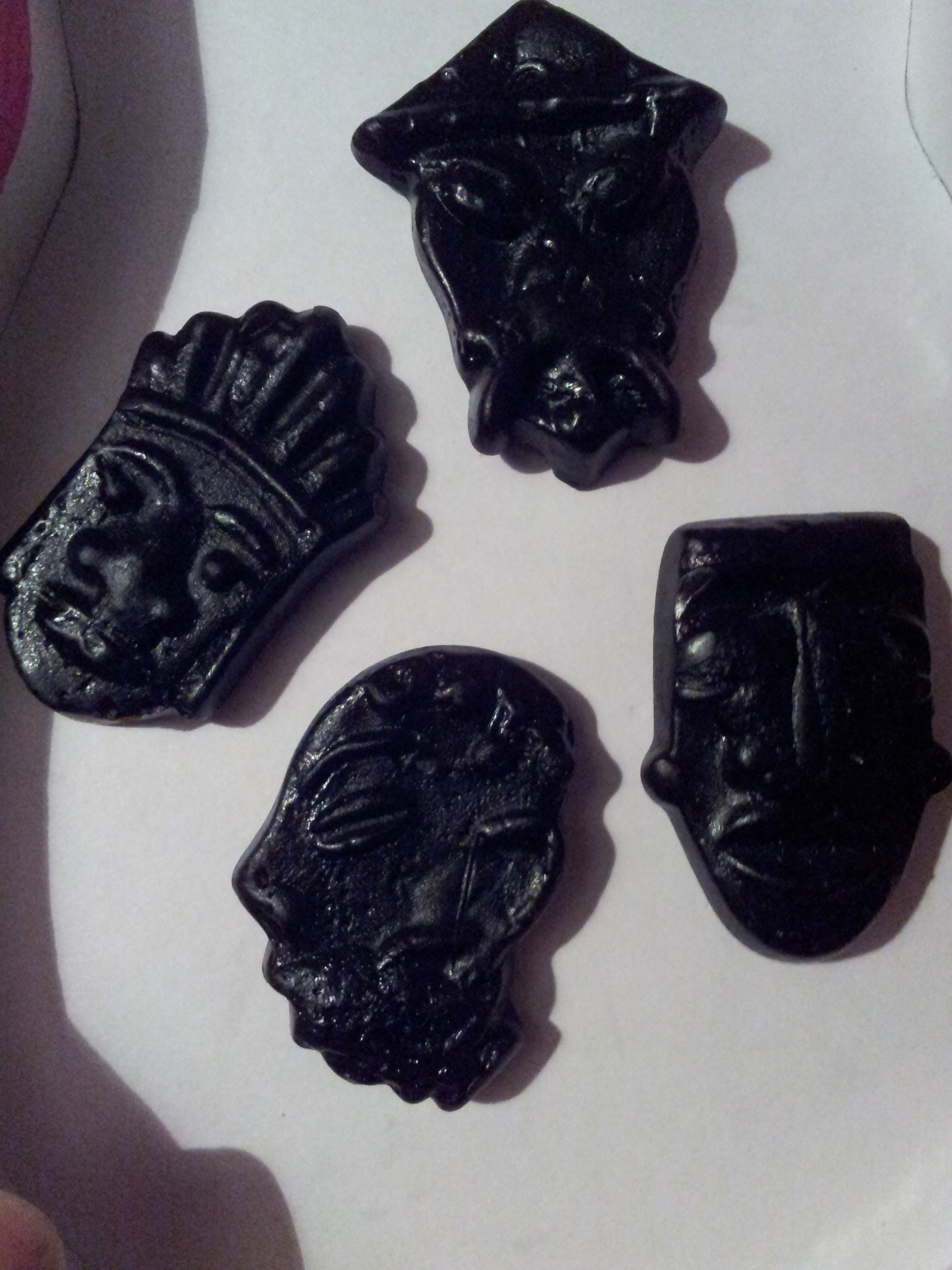
Liquorice confectionary from a bag of Haribo Matador Mix, March 2012.

Racism in Denmark often targets immigrants, particularly non-white or non-Western immigrants, including Black people, Romani people, Muslims, and Inuit. Jews occasionally experience antisemitism in Denmark. Anti-Black and anti-Indigenous racism in Denmark is tied to the centuries long history of the Danish slave trade and Danish colonialism in the Americas and Africa. Afro-Caribbean people, West Africans, Inuit, and Sámi in particular have been negatively affected by colonial Dano-Norwegian rule in the Danish West Indies, Ghana, Greenland, and the Sápmi region in northern Norway. Anti-racist and anti-colonial activists believe that Denmark and other Nordic countries have a "colonial amnesia" that results in many Danish people believing that Denmark is free from racism and had little involvement in European colonialism.

== Anti-Indigenous racism ==
=== Anti-Inuit racism ===
Populated by Indigenous Inuit, Greenland was colonized by Denmark. Greenland was a colony of Denmark until 1953, but is now classified as an autonomous region of the Danish Realm.

In 1951, the Danish government conducted what is known as the little Danes experiment. Twenty-two Inuit children from Greenland were separated from the parents and taken to Denmark to be given to foster parents as raised as "little Danes" instead of being raised in the Inuit culture. Several of the children never saw their biological families again. Out of the children who survived (many died young) six, now adults, have demanded compensation from the Danish government for their suffering.

The Danish ice cream brand Hansens Is once sold products that were called "Eskimo" and "Kæmpe Eskimo" (Giant Eskimo). Many Greenlandic Inuit in Denmark consider the term "Eskimo" to be outdated or offensive. The company changed the name in 2020 following the global George Floyd protests.

=== Anti-Sámi racism ===
Although Sámi people are not Indigenous to contemporary Denmark, they are Indigenous to parts of northern Norway in the Sápmi region that were once part of Denmark–Norway. The Dano-Norwegian government colonized Sámi land and encouraged settlers to move to Sápmi. Sámi activists have requested that a sacred drum that was confiscated by the Danish government after a 1691 witchcraft trial be granted Sámi ownership, campaigning for four decades. The sacred drum was owned by the Danish royal family before being given to the National Museum of Denmark, which had then loaned the drum to the Sámi Museum in Karasjok, Norway. Sámi activists wanted the drum to be given formal ownership by the museum. In 2022, after three centuries, the drum was granted permanent ownership by the Sámi Museum where it is displayed.

== Anti-Romani racism ==
Between the 1920s and the 1960s, Denmark as well as Sweden and Norway conducted coercive sterilization of Romani people who were considered "undesirables" by Scandinavian governments.

== Nazism ==
Several neo-Nazi and white supremacist organizations exist in Denmark, including the Danish branch of the Nordic Resistance Movement, the Danish Front, and the Party of the Danes. The goal of the Nordic Resistance Movement is to create a racist, pan-Nordic, and ethnically homogeneous state where immigrants, Jews, and Muslims will be deported.

== Slavery and colonialism ==
A racist cartoon by Alfred Schmidt published in the Danish magazine Klods-Hans in January 1917. It refers to the Treaty of the Danish West Indies, and depicts Woodrow Wilson adopting the three islands of the Danish West Indies, Saint Thomas, Saint John and Saint Croix (depicted as pickaninnies), from Denmark.

The Danish slave trade began in 1733 and was formally abolished under law in 1792, but slavery persisted in practice until 1848.

In 2017, the Danish government formally apologized to the Ghanaian government for the Danish colonial presence in West Africa. The Danish Gold Coast was located in what is now Ghana between 1658 and 1850.

In 2018, Denmark's first statue of a Black woman was erected in Copenhagen. The statue is of Mary Thomas, a labor leader from the Danish West Indies who helped lead the 1878 St. Croix labor riot.

Caribbean activists in the United States Virgin Islands (formally the Danish West Indies) have campaigned for the Danish government to give reparations due to the history of the Danish slave trade and the Danish colonization of the Virgin Islands.

Because the Danish West Indies was sold to the United States, there has been little immigration from the U.S. Virgin Islands to Denmark. While "colonial amnesia" has caused many Danish people to forget about the history of the Danish West Indies, U.S. Virgin Islanders are very aware of the Danish colonial legacy due to daily reminders in art, architecture, and placenames. Since 2020, following the global George Floyd protests, Danish awareness of Danish colonial history has increased. The city of Copenhagen has begun to consider renaming streets after enslaved people who rebelled against slavery.

Many food brands that are sold in Danish supermarkets have used African and Asian caricatures to sell their products. In some grocery stores, the section where these products are found is called "kolonial". In 2021, the Törsleffs corporation removed the image of a turban-wearing Sri Lankan man from their vanilla products and removed the image of a Chinese chef from their preserved jams. The Danish branch of Haribo redesigned their Skipper Mix licorice product after it was called racist by consumers because the candies were in the shape of African tribal masks and faces.

== See also ==
- Danish colonization of the Americas
- Danish nationalism
- Danish overseas colonies
- Danish West Indies
- Racism in Norway
- Racism in Sweden
- Nordic colonialism
