= Grove Place, U.S. Virgin Islands =

Coordinates: 17°43′32″N 64°49′22″W

Grove Place, United States Virgin Islands
- Village
- Interactive map of Grove Place, United States Virgin Islands
- Country: United States Virgin Islands
- Island: Saint Croix
- Time zone: UTC-4 (AST)

Grove Place is a settlement on the island of Saint Croix in the United States Virgin Islands. It was added to the National Register of Historic Places in 1978.

== History ==
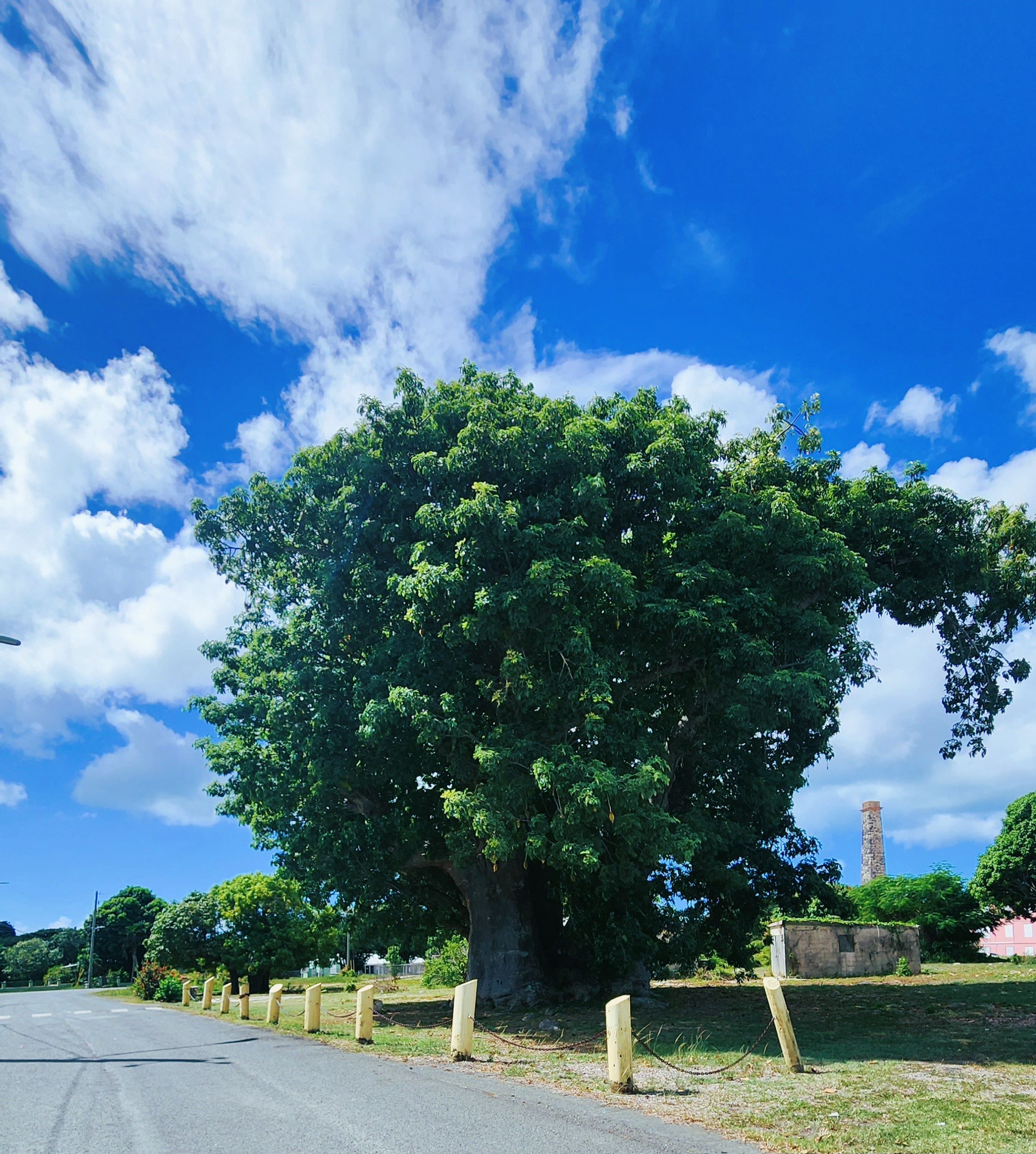
Baobab Tree and square tapered chimney 20230926

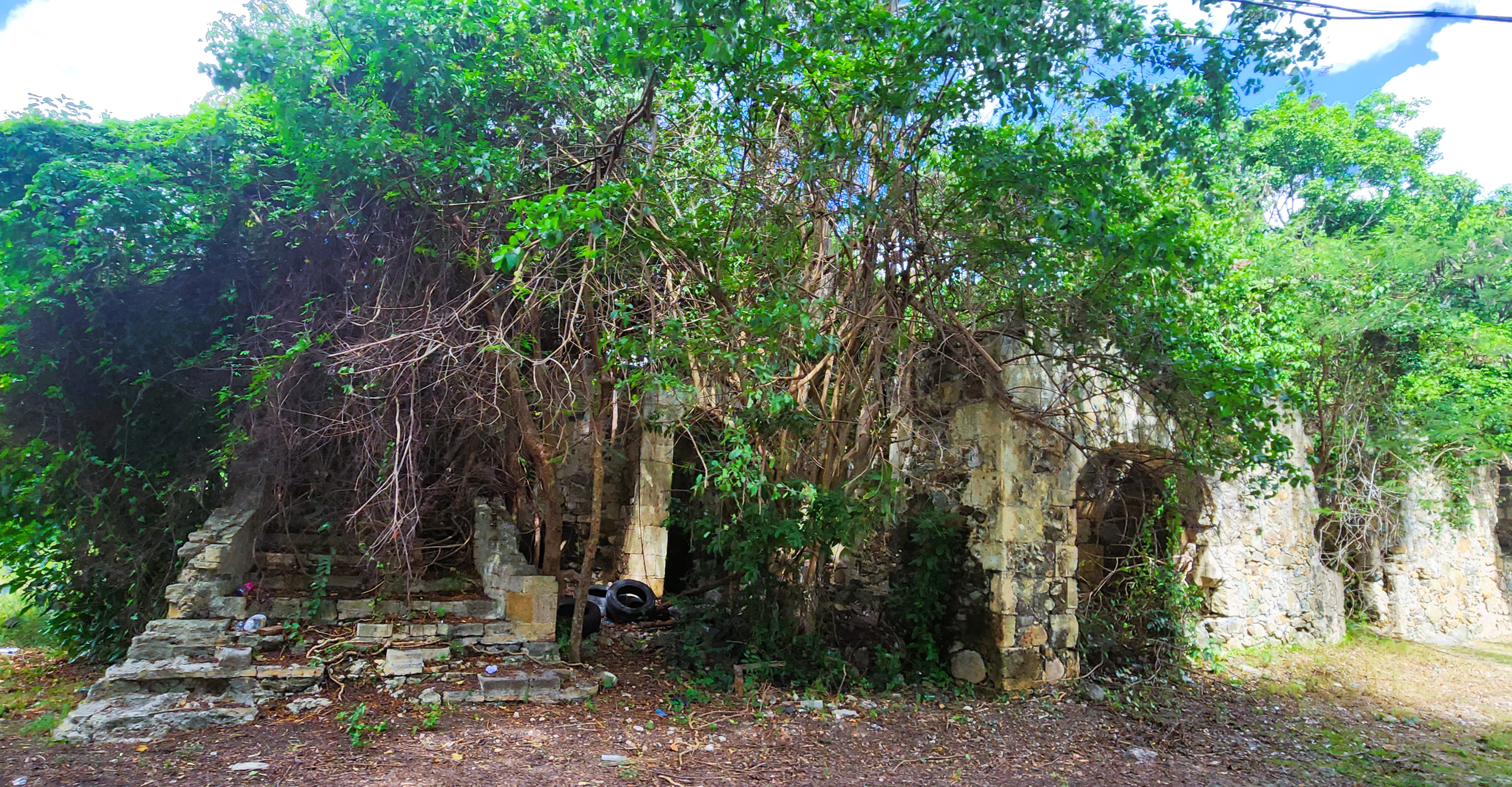
Grove Ruins 20230926

It is so named from the original settlement. Estate Grove Place is a historic sugar plantation located in Prince Quarter, St. Croix, U.S. Virgin Islands. It is significant for its 19th century remains of typical buildings of a sugar plantation, including a factory, wagon depot, and chimney. The ruins of the factory are of architectural significance because of the classic revival details, the plan, the method of construction and the use of local building materials, all typical of sugar factories in the Virgin Islands at this period. The wagon depot is unique in its elaborate use of local materials in construction which clearly shows the amount of wealth connected with the estate.

The plantation was established in the early 1800s and produced sugar until the late 19th century. The factory ruins include a boiling room, engine room, and sugar mill. The wagon depot was used to store and transport sugar cane and other goods. The chimney was part of the steam mill that powered the factory.

Grove Place is one of the few remaining examples of a complete sugar plantation complex in the Virgin Islands. The site is also important for its architectural significance. The factory ruins and wagon depot are fine examples of the classic revival style, which was popular in the Virgin Islands in the 19th century.

The plantation is currently owned by the government of the U.S. Virgin Islands and is managed by the Virgin Islands National Park. It is open to the public. for tours and educational programs.

== Adansonia Digitata ==
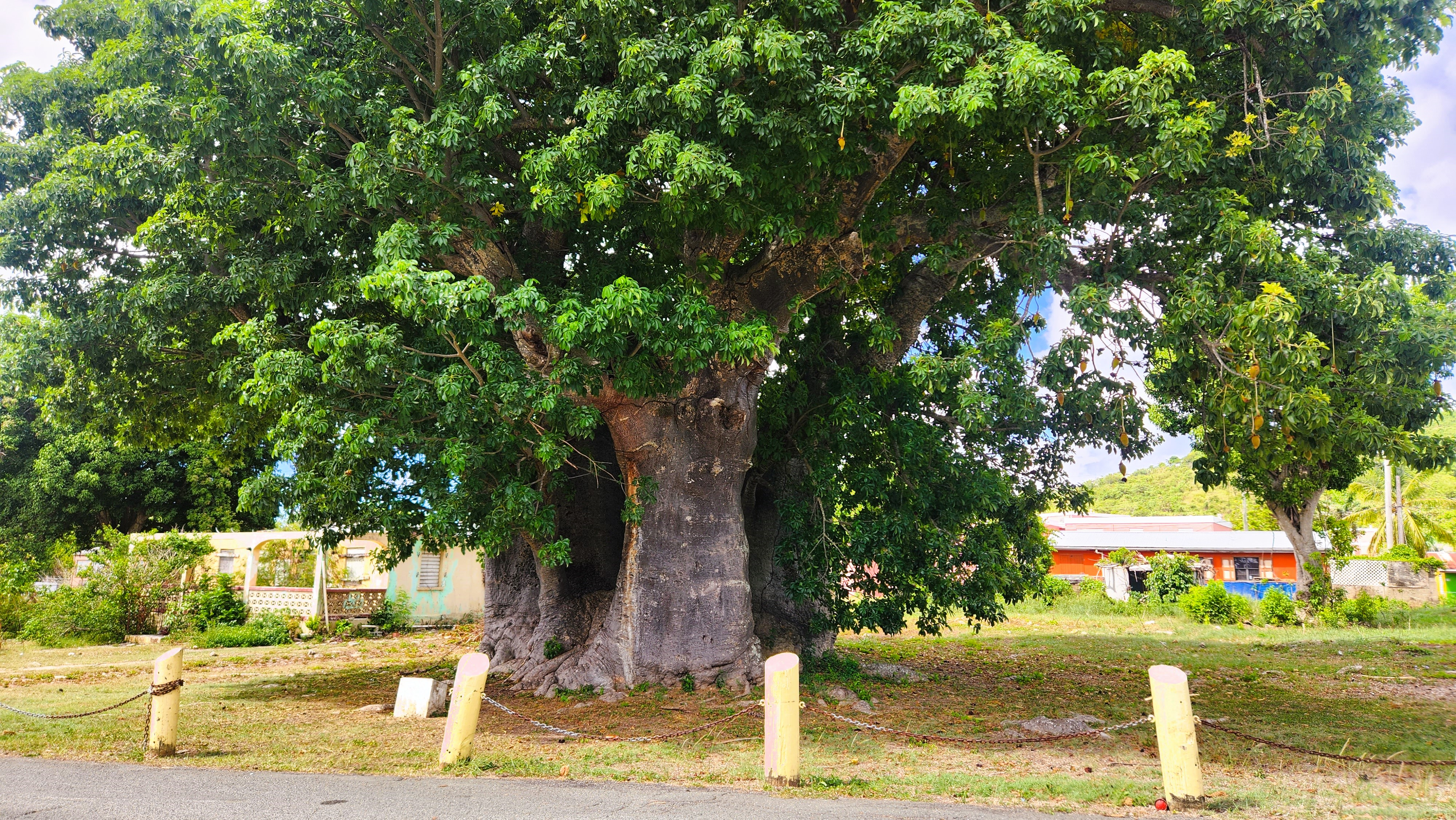
Baobab Tree 20230926

Located just east of the ruins is a 250 year old Baobab of the genus Adansonia digitata. The trunk is approximately 20' in diameter. Originally imported from West Africa, it is the largest one of approximately 100 of its kind left on St. Croix. It is on The Register of Champion Trees due to its size. There is a historic marker on site for the tree and 12 laborers burnt alive there for taking part in Queen Mary's Rebellion.

== David Hamilton Jackson Bust ==
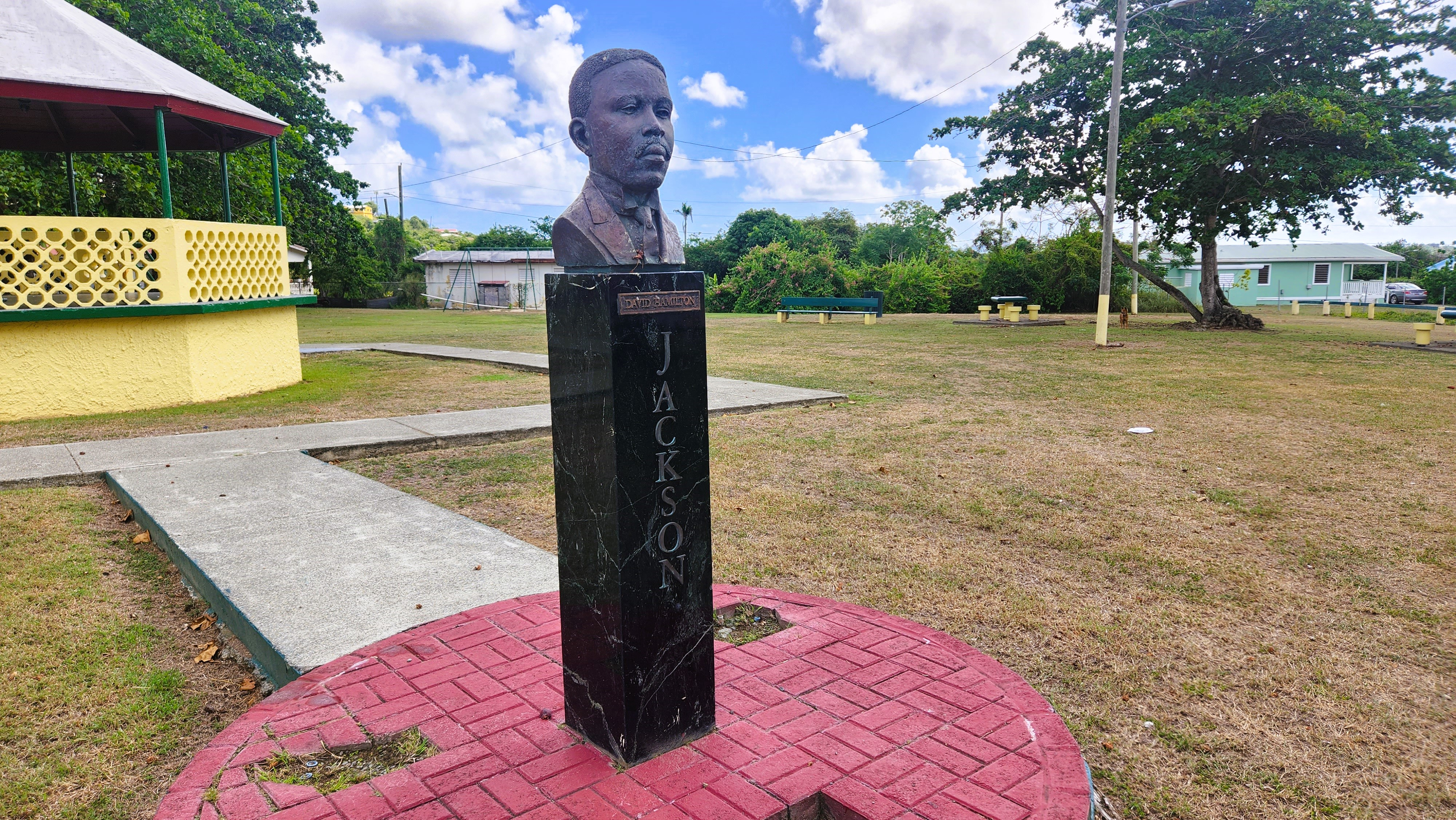
Jackson Bust 20230926

Across the street in front of a Gazebo is a memorial to early 20th century labor leader David Jackson. Jackson was a vocal advocate for civil rights in the Danish West Indies. He campaigned for the right to free speech and assembly, and for greater representation of the black population in the government. In 1917, he traveled to Denmark to lobby for the sale of the Danish West Indies to the United States. He argued that this would lead to greater economic and political opportunities for the black population of the islands.

== See also ==
- The Charles A. “Tappy” Seales Fire Station in Grove Place.
- Map of the history of St. Croix and the Heritage trail.
- Mary Thomas (labor leader) Queen Mary
- Estate Rust Op Twist
