= Cane knife =

Large hand-wielded cutting tool

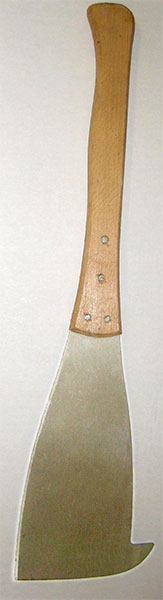
Typical cane knife, also used for banana plants

A cane knife is a large, hand-wielded cutting tool similar to a machete. Its use is prevalent in the harvesting of sugarcane in dominant cane-growing countries such as Peru, Brazil, Colombia, Australia, South Africa, Ecuador, Cuba, Jamaica, the Philippines and parts of the United States, especially Louisiana and Florida, as well as Hawaii.

== Design ==
A typical cane knife is characterized by a hardwood handle, a full tang, a wide metal blade and a hook at its tip used for picking up the cut cane, although some types do not employ this feature. The hook or bent part of the blade was used to minimize the distance a cutter would need to repetitively bend down to reach the base of the cane. The blade is usually 1 millimetre (0.039 in) thick, thinner than a machete or bolo, and more than 12 inches (30 cm) long. The thin blade slices through the cane better than a thicker blade because the harvester slashes the cane at an angle. Straight cane knives were used to slice the tops of the harvested cane, removing the parts of the cane that had no sugar content. The flat part of a straight cane knife could also be used to put out spot fires during burning.

Many cane knives were modified by the individual cutter to suit their particular style of cutting. This included bending the blade with heat or shaping the wooden handle to suit the cutter's hand. The length of the handle also made a difference depending on the environment. For instance, in rocky terrain, it was better to have a shorter handle so the cutter could see any rocks and avoid injury.

== Gallery ==
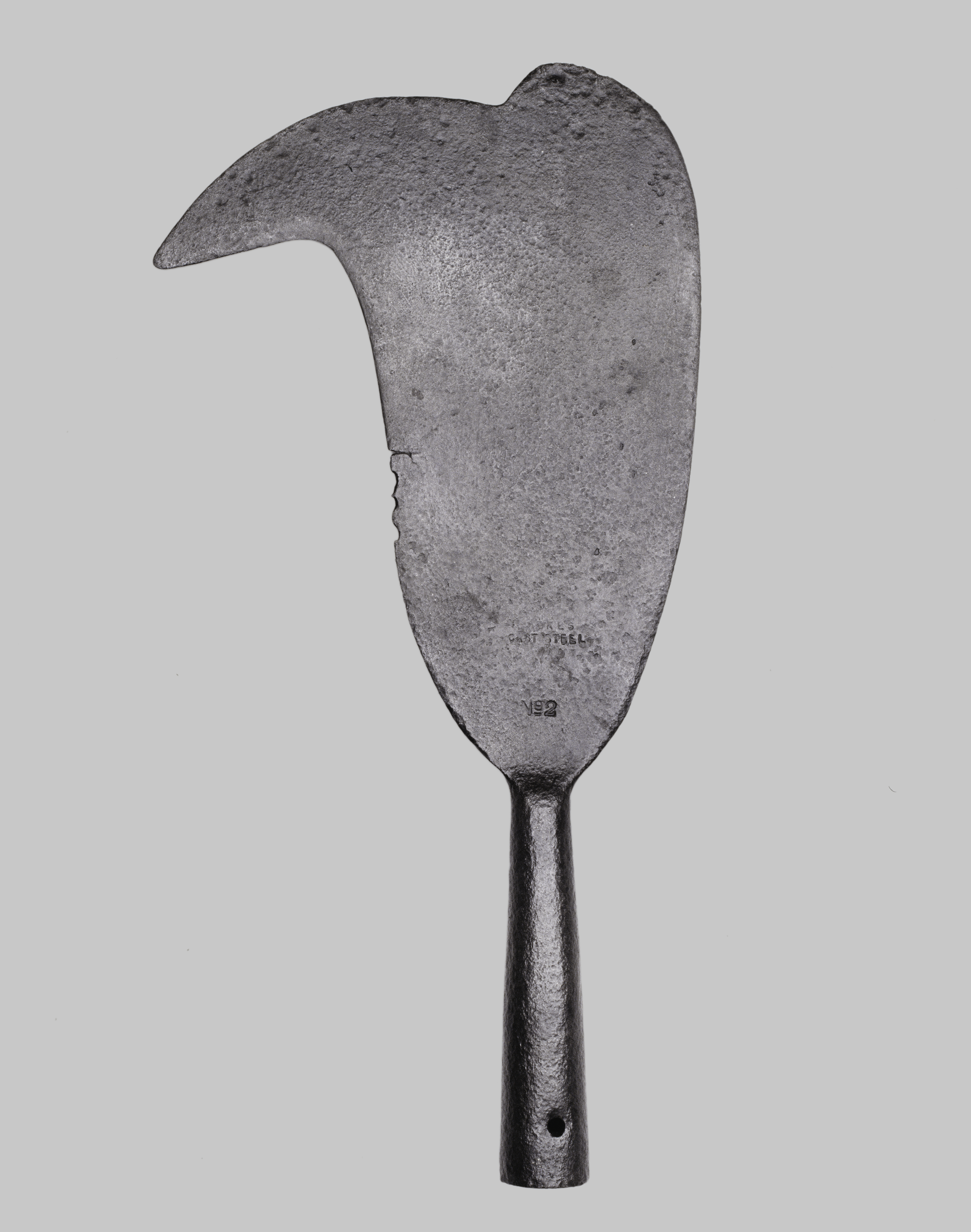
Sugar cane knife, 1800s, used by enslaved Africans to cut sugar cane in the Danish West Indies

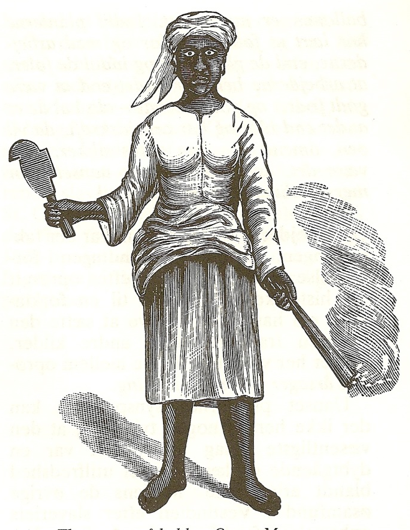
1888 drawing of "Queen Mary" Thomas, one of the leaders of the 1878 Fireburn riot in St. Croix, holding a cane knife and torch

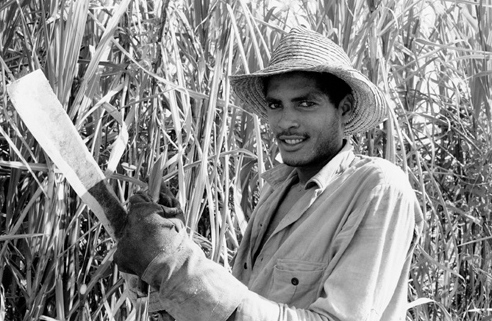
A sugar cane cutter in Cuba during zafra

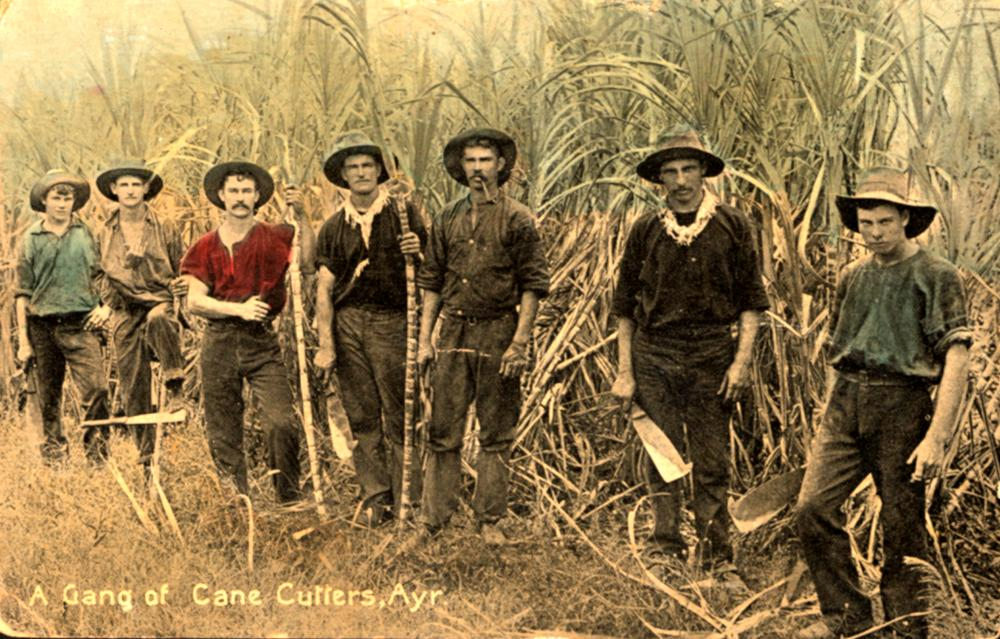
Canecutters in Ayr, Australia, c. 1907

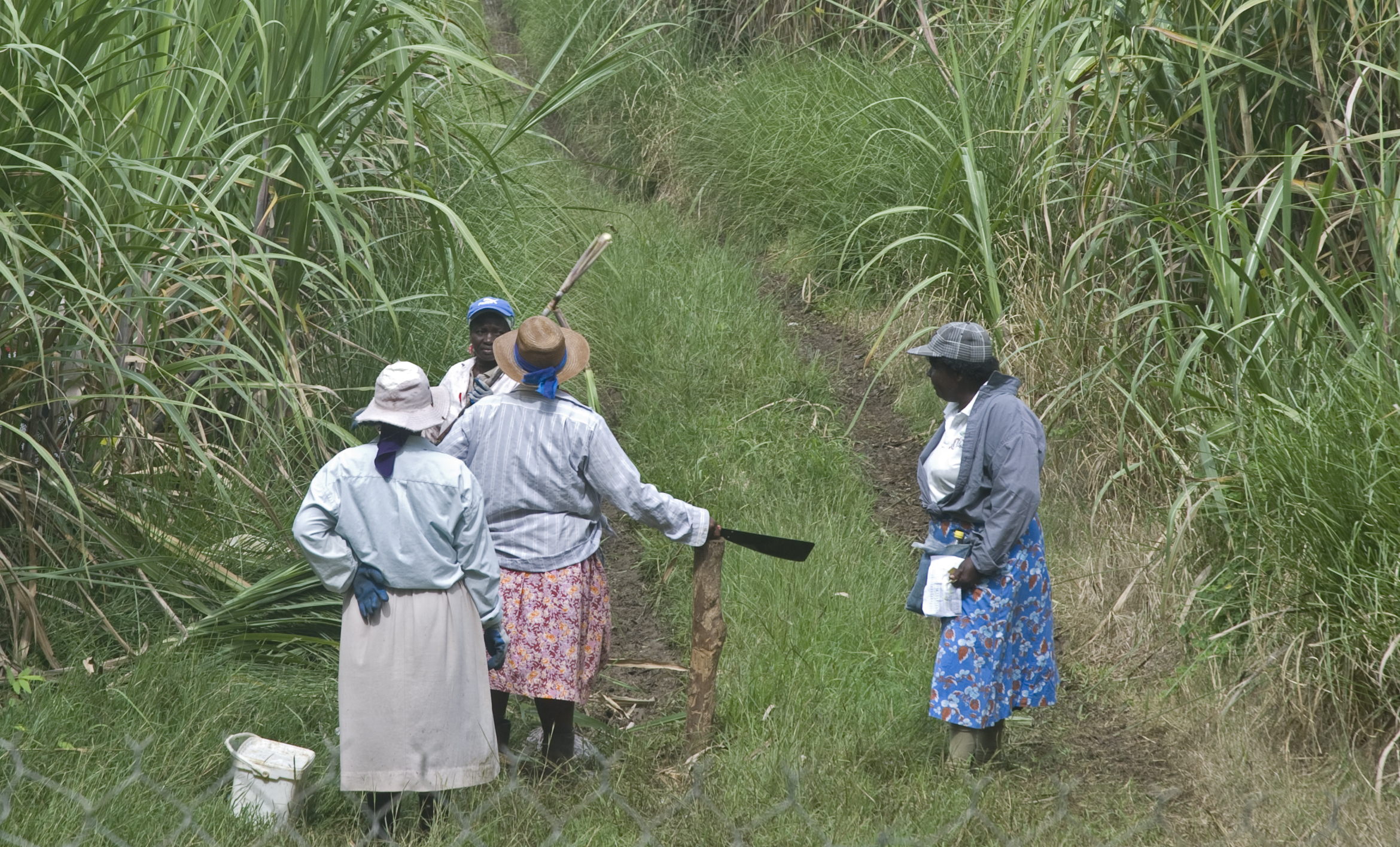
Female cane cutters in Barbados, 2011

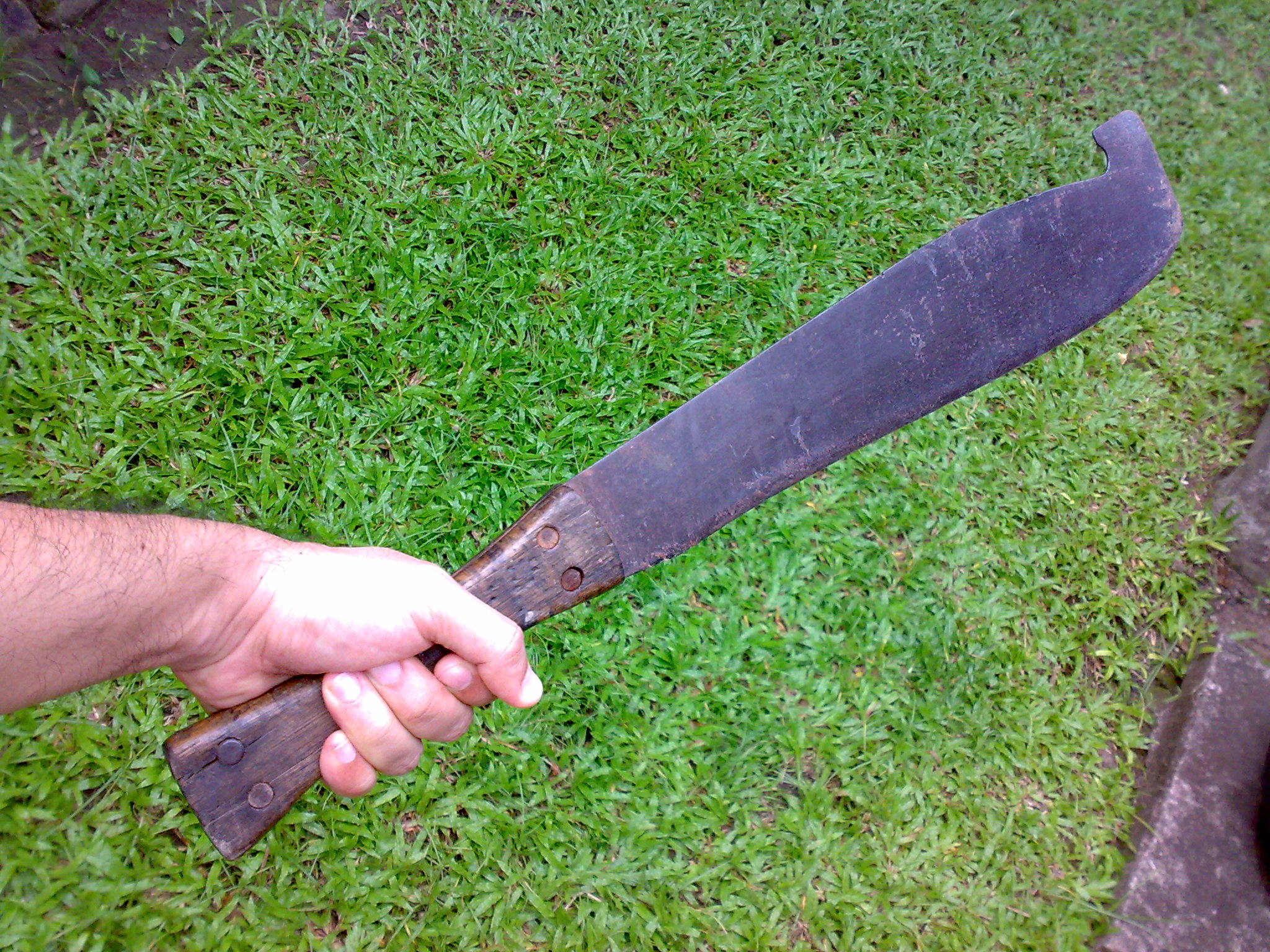
A well-used cane knife

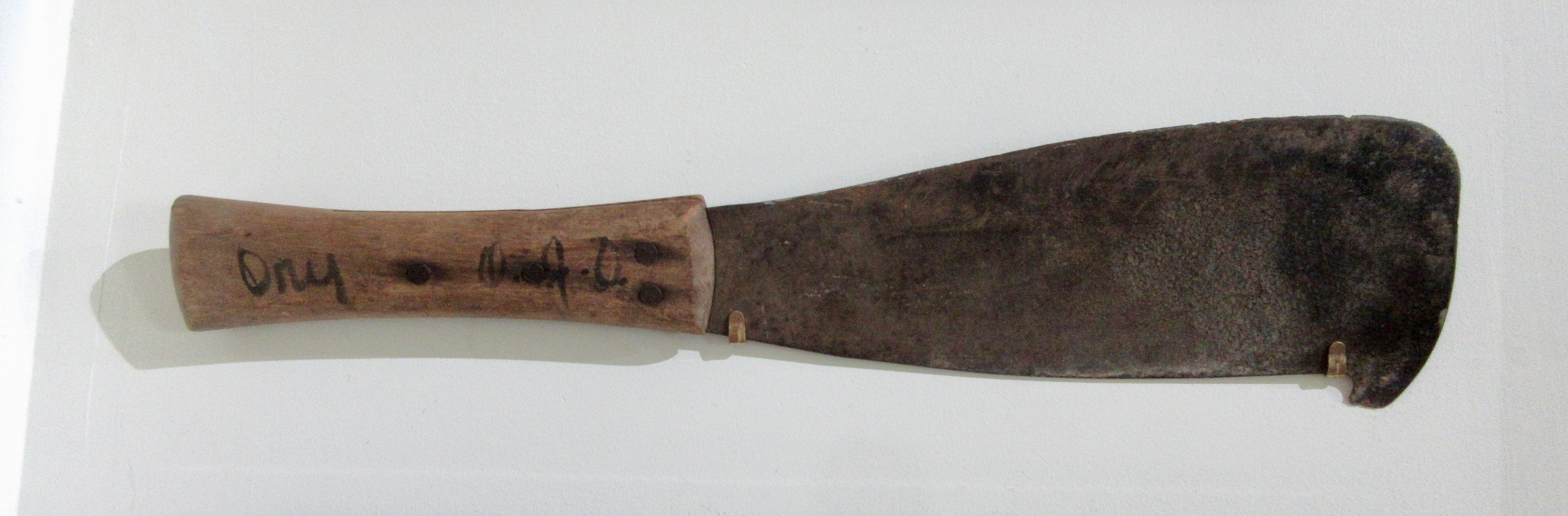
Old cane knife in south Louisiana, of the type that was the most common weapon in the 1811 German Coast uprising

== See also ==
- Kukri
- Golok
- Bolo knife
