= Angela Golden Bryan =

Writer, speaker, and film producer

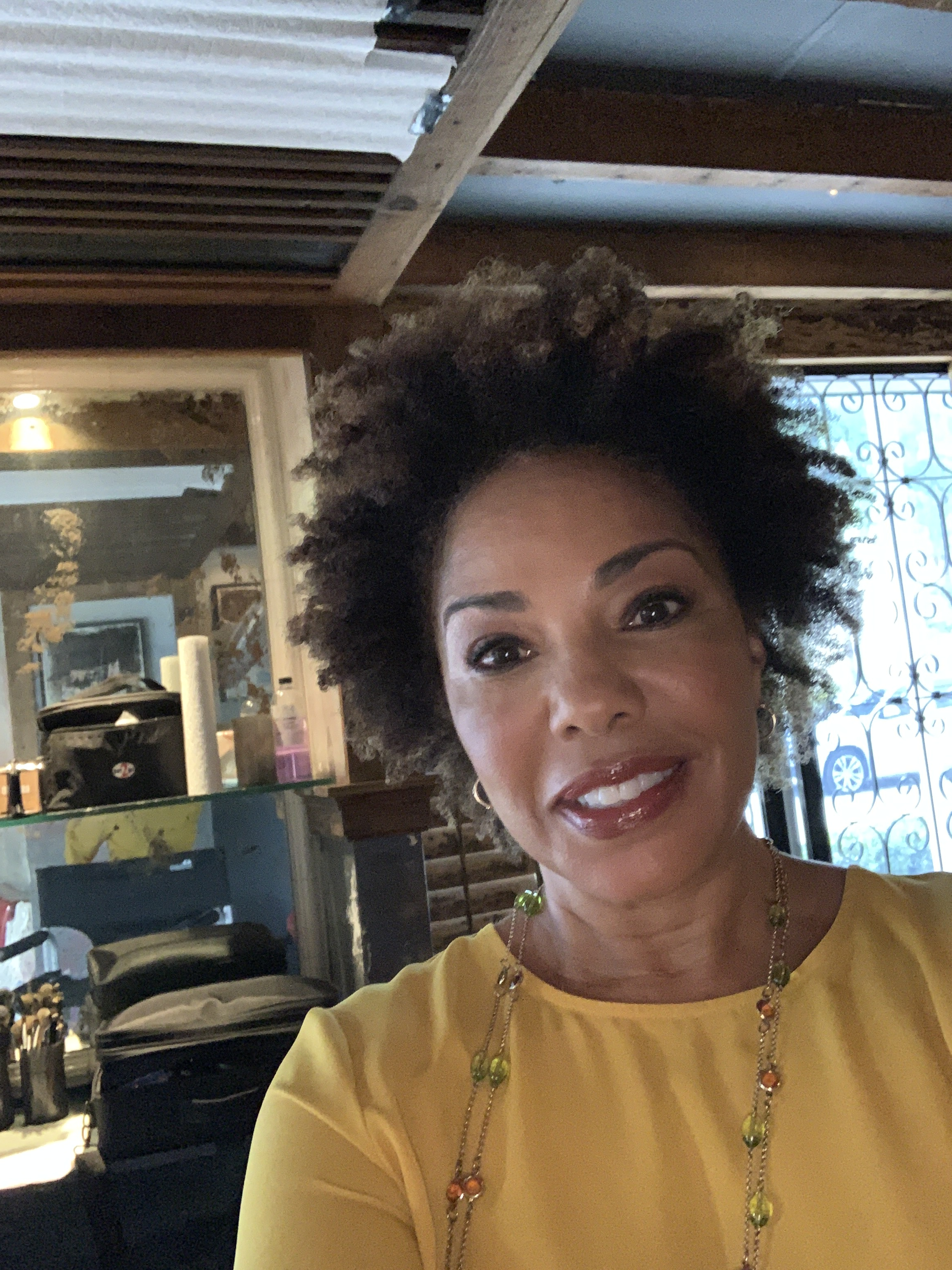
- Occupations: Writer, speaker, and film producer
- Years active: 2005–present

Angela Golden Bryan is a Caribbean-American writer, speaker and film producer. Her work focuses on the history and cultural heritage of the U.S. Virgin Islands, as well as Christian spirituality and wellness. Earlier in her career, she appeared as an actress in film and television.

== Life and career ==
Earlier in her career, Bryan appeared in film and television, including America's Most Wanted, Burn Notice, Simply Delicioso and Designing Spaces. Her film appearances included roles in Secrets of the Magic City, Promises and Wild Sunflowers.

In 2018, Bryan published her first book, Fireburn the Screenplay: A story of passion ignited, based on the history of St. Croix.” This book is based on the labor revolt that took place in 1878 and pays tribute to Mary Thomas and other leaders of the revolt. According to Bryan, the inspiration to write the story came after hearing stories about her great-great grandmother who was part of this revolt, which was also known as the Fireburn.

The following year, Bryan released her second book, James and the Fireburn, a children's book about anti-bullying and human rights. James and the Fireburn was inspired by the same events of Caribbean history as her first novel.

Her film Fireburn the Documentary, which was based on her first book, premiered in 2021. The documentary interviews educators, historians, and artists regarding the labor revolt of 1878. Bryan’s nonprofit received a grant from the Community Foundation of the Virgin Islands in 2022 to place all of her Fireburn products into each of the public schools in the Virgin Islands. In 2022, Fireburn the Screenplay and James and the Fireburn were selected to represent the Virgin Islands in the Library of Congress Center for the Book’s "Great Reads from Great Places" programme.

In 2024, Bryan and her daughter Erin Shae Bryan co-authored Anna and the Goat Foot Woman, a children’s book based on the Caribbean folktale of the Goat Foot Woman. Her book, Roots and Resilience: An Island Girl’s Path to Spiritual Growth and Transformation, was published in August 2024. Beginning in 2024, Bryan led the Virgin Islands ABCs Initiative with the Caribbean Museum Center for the Arts. She wrote the rhymes for Island Alphabet: Discovering the Virgin Islands Letter by Letter, an alphabet book about the history, culture and natural environment of the Virgin Islands. The book was illustrated by third-grade students from three St. Croix schools.

In 2026, Bryan published Treasure Your Temple: A Devotional Guide for Nourishing Your Mind, Body & Spirit, a Christian devotional book combining biblical teachings with nutrition, healthy living, and mental, physical, and spiritual well-being.

== Personal life ==
Bryan partnered with the United Nations Association of the United States of America as an Ambassador for Gender Equality. She is married, has two adult children and currently resides in Weston, Florida.

== Filmography ==
Year	Title	Role	Notes
2005	Designing Spaces	Herself	
2007	Kitchen Spaces	Herself	
2008	Simply Delicioso	Herself	2 episodes
2008	America's Most Wanted: America Fights Back		
2008	Wild Sunflowers	Political Reporter	
2008	I Have No Idea	Angela	Short film
2009	Away We Go	Passenger	
2009	Up in the Air	Dockside Shopper	
2009	Rough Winds	Mom in Bakery	
2010	Promises	Homeless Lady	
2011	1236	Anne Stirling	
2012	5th of a Degree	Police Station Receptionist	
2013	The Denied	Dr. Williams	Short film
2013	Not for Human Consumption	Marcia	
2013	Run Stinky Run	Agent Holbrook	
2014	La Llave Del Rey	Sandra Hernandez	Short film
2014	Secrets of the Magic City	Jackelyn Castle	
2014	The Killing of a Japanese Bookie	Betty	
2016	Mud Man	Chaperone	
2020	Fireburn the Documentary		Executive Producer
