= I Am Queen Mary =

Danish monument

Photograph of the statue in January 2020

I Am Queen Mary is a statue in Copenhagen, Denmark of Mary Thomas, a leader of the 1878 "Fireburn" labor revolt in St. Croix, a former Danish colony now part of the U.S. Virgin Islands. The statue, created by artists Jeannette Ehlers and La Vaughn Belle, was unveiled in March 2018 outside Vestindisk Pakhus (West Indian Warehouse), in commemoration of the 100th anniversary of the sale and transfer of the Danish West Indies. It is the first public monument in Denmark to honor a Black woman and represent Denmark's colonial past. The statue suffered significant damage during a storm on December 27, 2020, leaving it irreparable. Since then, only the plinth remains, and the artists are trying to fund a permanent bronze version of the statue.

== Overview ==
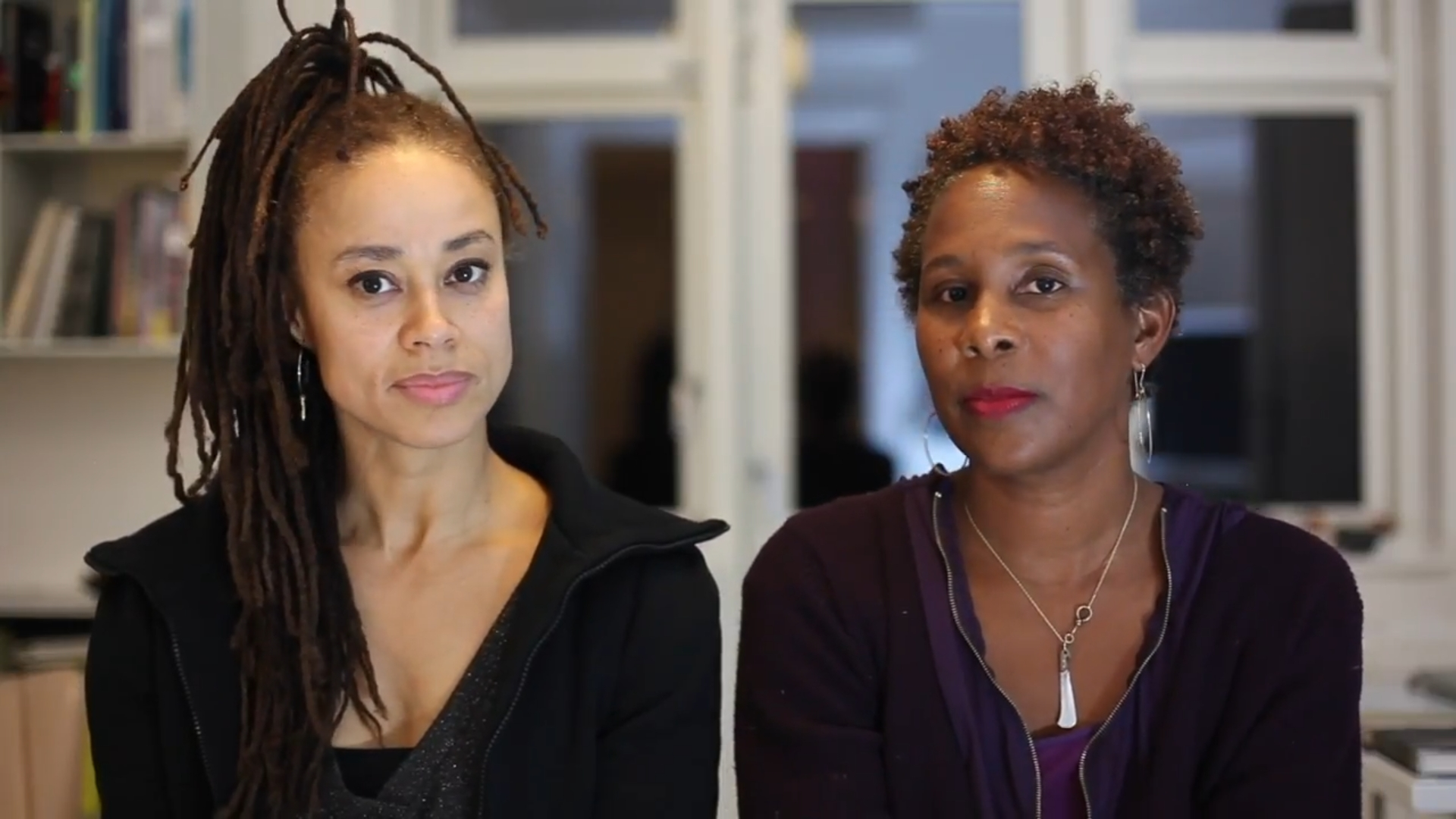
Jeannette Ehlers (left) and La Vaughn Belle (right) in 2018

At approximately 23 ft (7.0 m) tall, the statue depicts Thomas seated on a throne, staring ahead, with bare feet, a head wrap, a torch in her left hand, and a sugarcane cutting tool in her right hand. The torch and sugarcane cutting tool symbolize resistance strategies used in the St. Croix labor riot by enslaved and former slaves in Danish Colonies. The sugar cane cutting tools were knife-like objects given to enslaved people on St. Croix sugarcane plantations to cut off sugarcane stalks at the root. The statue's throne design references a 1967 photograph of Huey P. Newton, founder of the Black Panther Party.

I Am Queen Mary is a public artwork that represents Denmark's historical involvement in transatlantic slavery and the resistance by enslaved individuals. The statue provides a visual representation of historical narratives that have been historically marginalized, creating a space for reflection on colonial history and Black resistance.

== Design and process ==
The sculpture was created through a collaborative process involving Belle and Ehlers working with a team of fabricators and designers. Daviid Ranløv, 3D Printhuset, Teknologisk Institut, and Atelier Angheluta contributed to developing renderings and 3D-printed gesso versions.

The artists created a hybrid representation of their own bodies using 3D body scanning technology to form Thomas' body. The project was conceived as a site-specific intervention, referencing Michelangelo's David sculpture in front of the Danish West Indian Warehouse in Copenhagen, a former Caribbean sugar and rum warehouse, close to the site where Thomas was imprisoned following her arrest during the labor uprising. The work also references the 1968 photograph of Black Panther leader Huey P. Newton sitting in a rattan chair. Early iterations of the sculpture included a whip, which was replaced with a sugarcane cutting tool and torch to emphasize resistance strategies and labor conditions of sugarcane plantations, along with leaving her feet bare.

The sculpture was milled from polystyrene blocks at the Wow Factory in Denmark and coated with sealants and paint to ensure durability. The plinth is made of 1.5 tons of coral stones imported from St. Croix, Virgin Islands. These stones were historically cut by enslaved Africans who were sent into the ocean to harvest them. The stones were sourced from historic properties and transported across the Atlantic over a two-and-a-half-month journey, to be cleaned with a solution to remove mold and dirt.
