= Blackbeard's Castle =

Site in Charlotte Amalie, US Virgin Islands

- Skytsborg
- U.S. National Register of Historic Places
- U.S. National Historic Landmark
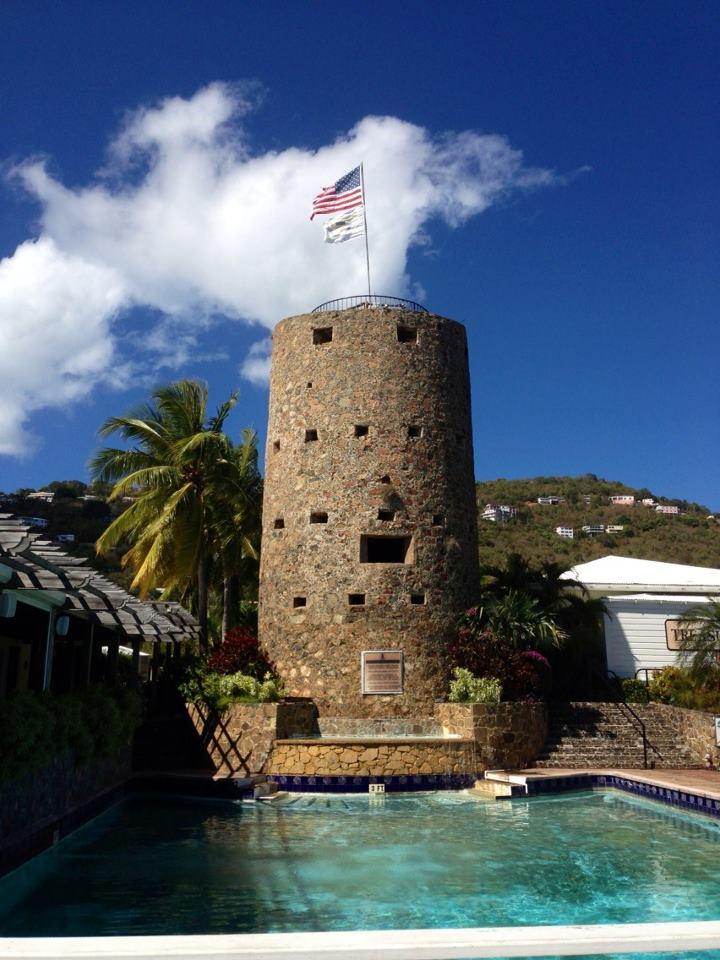

- Location within the U.S. Virgin Islands
- Location: Charlotte Amalie, U.S. Virgin Islands
- Coordinates: 18°20′37.83″N 64°55′46.53″W
- Built: 1679
- NRHP reference No.: 91001844

Significant dates
- Added to NRHP: December 20, 1991
- Designated NHL: October 12, 1994

Blackbeard's Castle is one of five National Historic Landmarks in the U.S. Virgin Islands. It is located in the city of Charlotte Amalie, on the island of St. Thomas. Erected in 1679 by the Danes as a watchtower to protect the harbor as well as Fort Christian, Blackbeard's Castle was originally called Skytsborg (meaning protection castle). It is located at the highest point of Government Hill. Skytsborg served as a very effective vantage point for Danish soldiers to spot enemy ships. Fort Christian is at sea level, thus making it ideal for thwarting attackers with cannon fire; however, the fort itself did not provide an ideal view of incoming ships entering the harbor.

It was the centerpiece of a private residence for many years, and was turned into a hotel, but is no longer open to the public.

== Connection to Blackbeard ==
It is not known when Skytsborg took on the name of Blackbeard's Castle, but the infamous Edward Teach, commonly known as Blackbeard, did sail the Caribbean waters in the early 18th century. It has become part of the lore of the island that he used the tower as a lookout for his own purposes of piracy.

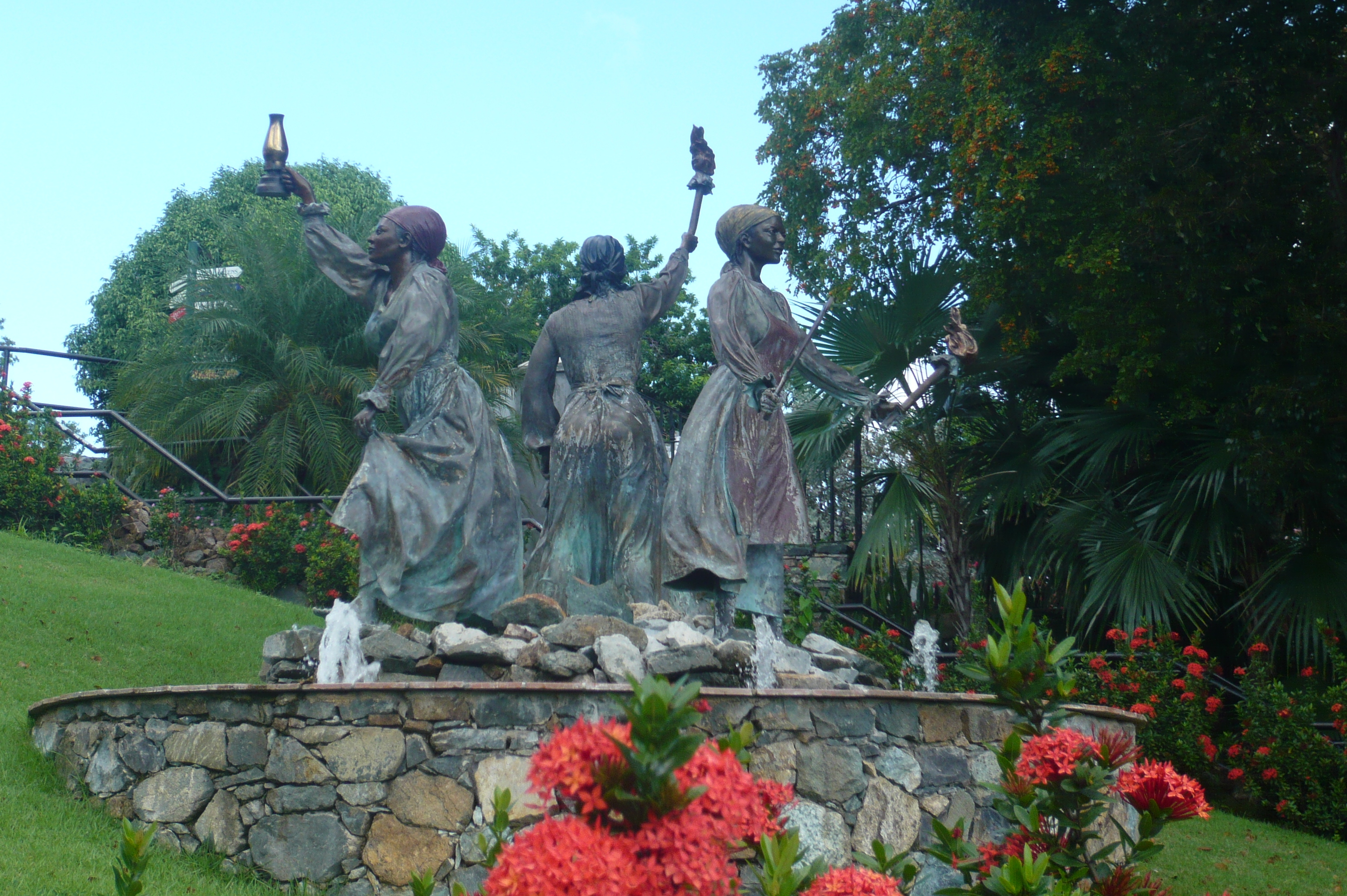
The Three Queens Fountain at Blackbeard's honors the 1878 Fireburn rebellion organizers: Queens Mary, Agnes, and Mathilda

== See also ==
- List of United States National Historic Landmarks in United States commonwealths and territories, associated states, and foreign states
- National Register of Historic Places listings in the United States Virgin Islands
