= Estate Rust Op Twist =

Coordinates: 17°46′49″N 64°47′18″W

Estate Rust-Op-Twist is a former colonial sugar plantation situated near Christiansted on the island of Saint Croix in the U.S. Virgin Islands. It was a hub of sugar production from 1755 until the early 1900s, and is currently listed on the US National Register of Historic Places.

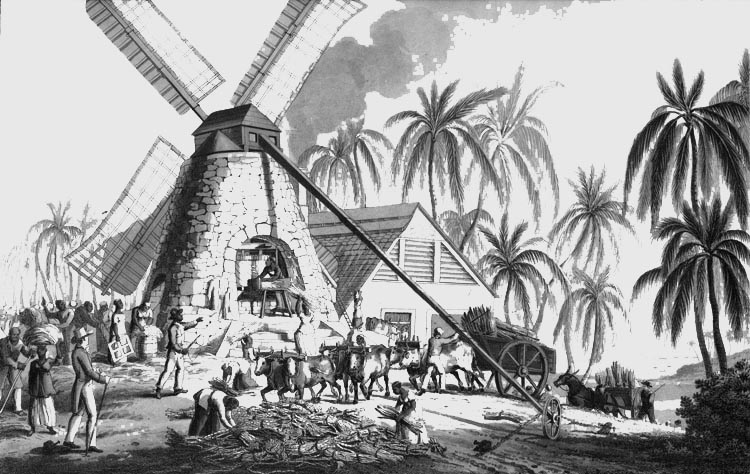
St. Croix Virgin Islands History 18CG Windmill 15

== History ==
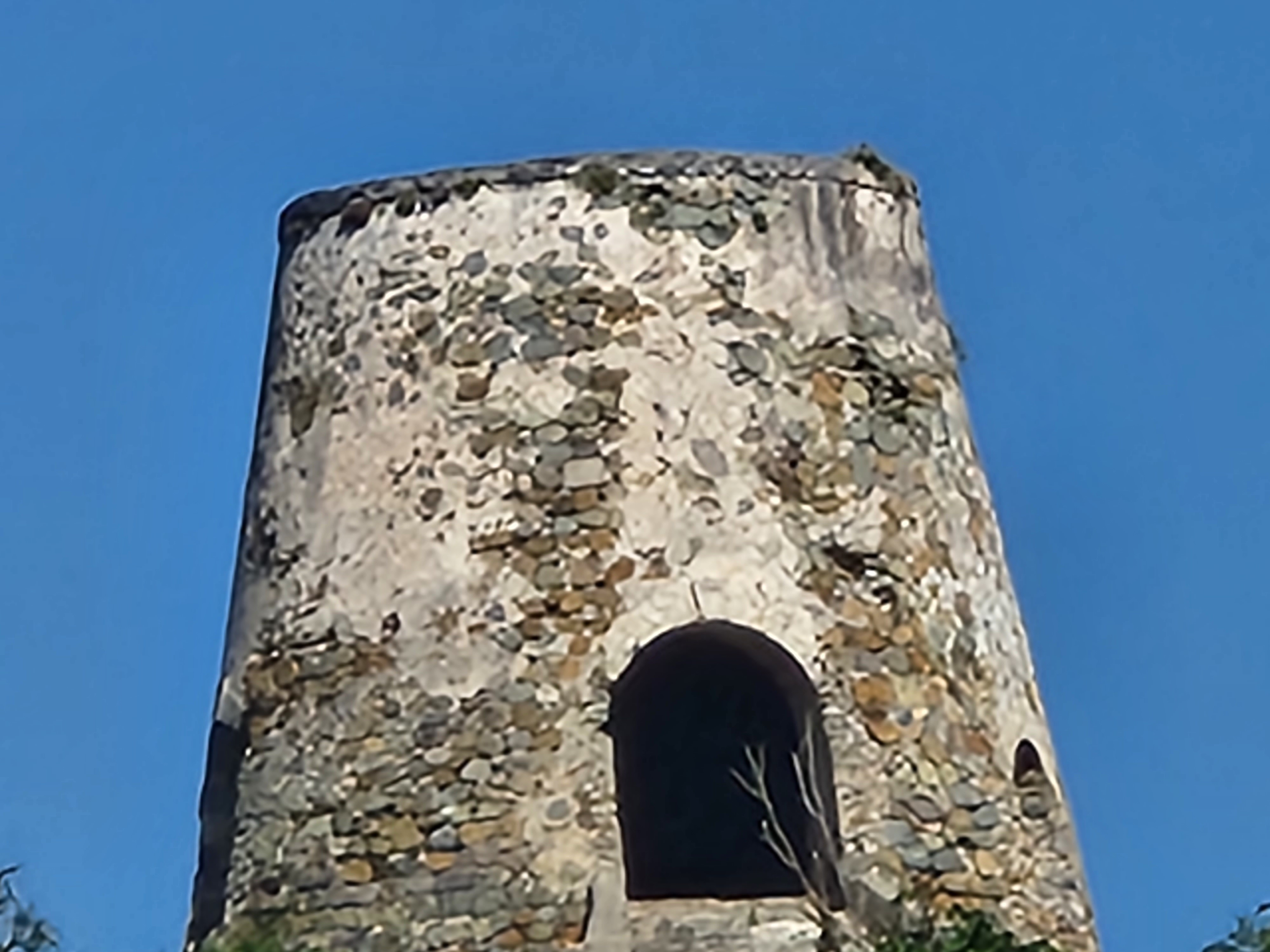
Rust-op-Twist sugar mill

The estate's main buildings were built in 1851 and 1878. Its name, "Rust-Op-Twist", translated from Dutch, means "Rest After Struggle, Toil, or Strife." The estate produced sugar for 130 years until around 1880. In the arc of history, Estate Rust-Op-Twist mirrors the gradual decline of the once-prosperous sugar industry on St. Croix.

Presently, Estate Rust-Op-Twist has its original steam engine and a sugar cane crusher, a windmill, and an animal-operated mill. While the original factory building's ruins have been rebuilt in modern times, they now serve as laboratories and warehouses for the St. Croix Marine Station, operated by the University of Texas Marine Science Institute. Other extant structures, including slave quarters and the plantation overseer's residence, have been restored to accommodate contemporary housing.

== Northside Quarter B ==
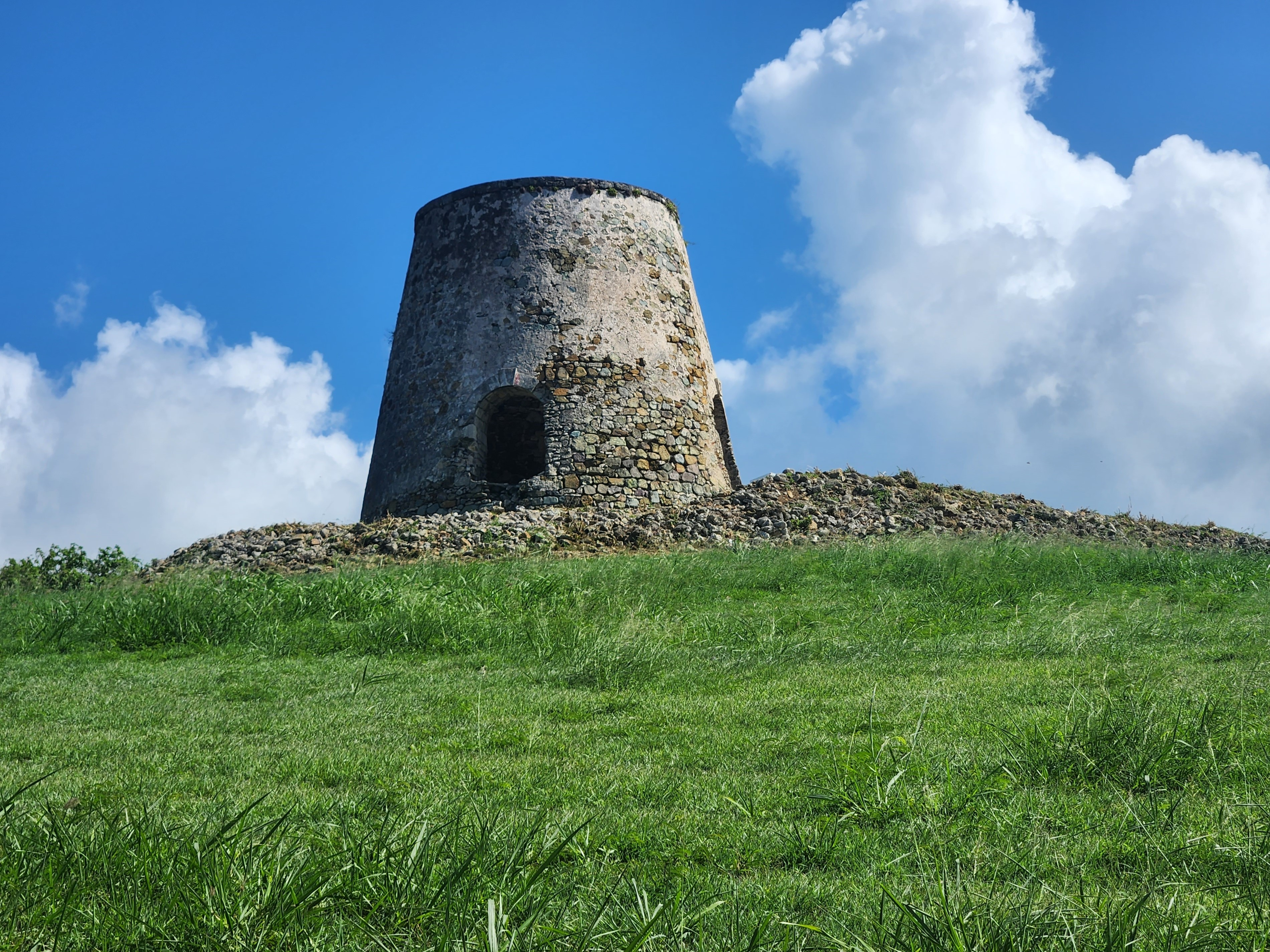
Rust-op-twist SugarMill

This district, one of the nine delineated during the Danish West India–Guinea Company's survey of St. Croix in the 1730s and 1740s, retained a predominantly unsettled character up until 1750.

In 1751, Nicolai Tuit and Company purchased seven plantations in Northside Quarter B, including estates 5 and 6. These estates, larger than most at 200 acres, were built in a valley surrounded by five hills, with one later becoming known as "Rust-op-twist Hill."

Between 1751 and 1755, tax records and a St. Croix map dated 1754 record an absence of cultivation activities on their holdings.

In 1755, the Danish Government introduced a decree that estates left uncultivated solely for land investment purposes would be subject to confiscation.

Subsequently, in 1757, records indicate that their estates were patented to Johann Balthazar Uytendaal.

== The Uytendaals ==
Estate Rust-Op-Twist, Seam Engine and Cane Mill, Title Sheet - Estate Rust-Op-Twist, Steam Engine and Cane Mill, Christiansted, St. Croix, VI HAER VI,1-NORT,1-A- (sheet 1 of 4)

Johann Balthazar Uytendaal, residing on St. Thomas Island, positioned some 40 miles northwest of St. Croix, became an absentee landowner of the latter island. He entrusted a foreman to oversee the management of his St. Croix plantations. In 1759, Uytendaal paid taxes for 16 slaves, a workforce that he would significantly expand to 30 slaves by 1765.

A map from 1766 documented Uytendaal's connection to estates 5 and 6 in Northside Quarter B, suggesting that his foreman, presumably Larrens Bddkins, played an important role. The map also showed the presence of an animal mill on the property, potentially the same one that stands today at Rust-op-Twist. This mill is marked by a circular stone wall, roughly four feet high and three feet wide, located about 100 yards east of the current warehouse housing the steam engine. While the milling apparatus is missing, a raised hump in the ground roughly at the mill's center indicates its prior location.

The number of slaves on Uytendaal's estates increased, reaching 87 in 1769, surpassing all others in that quarter. By 1773, the number grew to 158 slaves. In 1780, this figure declined to 84 slaves, following the involvement of two of Uytendaal's sons, Paulus and Joseph, in estate operations. A third son, Lucas, joined as a "resident owner" in 1786.

By this time, the Uytendaals had severe financial challenges stemming from a loan Johann Balthazar Uytendaal had secured in 1769 from a Dutch lending firm. During the 1760s, several St. Croix estate owners took out loans to expand their operations and acquire more slaves, with Dutch investment companies facilitating most of these loans. However, the bankruptcy of these Dutch firms in the late 1700s triggered financial difficulties for the estate owners.

In 1785, when the Danish Government took control of the accounts of these bankrupt Dutch lending companies, the Uytendaal loan debt amounted to 124,872 Dutch florins. By 1793, this debt had increased to 203,142 florins, leading to a court proclamation that led the Uytendaals to surrender their estates and their 125 slaves to a trust. An attorney known as Coppy administered these lands until 1796 when Lucas Uytendaal assumed ownership with 158 slaves.

Oxholm's 1799 map of St. Croix referred to plantations 5 and 6 as a single estate named "Rust-on-Twist" and indicated the presence of a windmill on the estate. It is possible that the 1769 Uytendaal loan was used for the construction of this windmill tower, which still stands today, located approximately 30 yards beyond and to the northeast of the animal mill. However, no machinery remains within the windmill.

== Hans Winding and William Woods ==
In 1800, the debt on Rust-op-Twist amounted to 201,607 florins as Hans Winding and William Woods assumed ownership. Their plantation, spanning 420 acres, featured 200 acres cultivated for sugar cane and a workforce of 156 taxable slaves. Four years later, they expanded with an additional 100 acres dedicated to sugar cane, resulting in the largest estate land tax in their quarter, totaling 340 rigsdalers.

By 1805, Hans Winding became the sole owner and held the estate until his death in 1812, at which point his heirs inherited the property. During this time, the sugar cane acreage saw a decline from 300 acres in 1804 to just 190 acres in 1816, accompanied by a drop in the number of slaves to 112.

The longstanding debt on the estate now became intertwined with that of Estate Cassova (Cassave Garden). The 1820s ushered in a difficult period for the sugar industry, characterized by droughts, plummeting sugar prices, and economic hardships for St. Croix planters.

Despite these adversities, the Winding heirs held onto Rust-op-Twist until 1834 when they sold the estate to Nicolai Jurgenson for 190,832.17 florins. Under Jurgenson's ownership, the estate's productivity was notable, with some 189,585 net pounds of sugar exported in 1840.

In late November of the same year, Jurgenson sold Rust-op-Twist to Count Adam Moltke for Ps 74,000. Count Moltke retained the estate, which had 120 acres under sugar cultivation and a workforce of 100 slaves, until 1849. This was a year after the emancipation of slaves by the St. Croix governor.

Following Count Moltke's ownership, the Royal West Indies Loan Commission once again acquired Rust-op-Twist for Ps 74,000, marking the end of an era for the estate in the face of changing times and economic challenges.

== Westiholz and Company ==
After six years under the Royal West Indies Loan Commission's control, Rust-op-Twist appeared on the auction block in 1850. The estate, as advertised in the St. Croix Avis, encompassed 415 acres of land, with 115 acres devoted to sugar cultivation. The sale included a complete set of sugar works with an inventory, a sufficient stock of resources, and access to ample natural water sources.

On October 29, 1850, in a bid to enhance Rust-op-Twist's sugar production facilities, "Westiholz and Company," likely acting as a purchasing agent for the Loan Commission, placed an order for a steam engine and mill from the McOnie and Mirrlees Company in Glasgow, Scotland. This steam engine, described in the Historic American Engineering Record as a "classic example of the foundry or cast-iron age of engine-building," remained in good condition at the estate as of 1977. It was missing only a few components, including parts of the valve gear and the bearing cap for the intermediate gear.

The engine's key features included a cast-iron, non-counterweighted crank arm, a 2-ball Watt-type governor with slotted arc guides and restraints, a D slide valve, and a "pump rod of apparent blacksmith origin." Its flywheel, composed of wrought-iron spokes and a cast-iron hub and rim, measured 10 feet in diameter with a 4 1/2-inch face. This engine, with a 12-1/2-inch cylinder bore and a 24-inch piston stroke, likely delivered approximately 20 horsepower. It had two reduction gears with a reduction ratio of 12:1, running on shafts supported in two-piece brass box bearings, and was mounted on a stone base.

A single roller, measuring 21 inches in diameter and 42 inches in length, remained in place on the cane-crushing unit. When operational, it is estimated that the three rollers rotated at about 1-1/2 to 2 revolutions per minute. The mill had a capacity of around 5 tons of cane per hour, requiring approximately 15 horsepower with a normal feed of cane.

== Decline ==
The ruins of the original factory building, while altered and rebuilt in recent times, still suggest a standard T-form design described by Oxholm. Stone archways in the ruins next to the west wall of the present-day warehouse likely served the sugar-works room containing coppers and clarifiers.The factory building had the T-stem (sugar-works room) oriented north and south, with the T-head (rum and storage rooms) oriented east and west. None of the sugar-works apparatus from this factory remains. The steam engine, a later addition, was housed in the T-stem sugar-works room, which differed from other Virgin Islands sites.

Sugar production figures for Rust-op-Twist show that sugar exports increased from 42,336 net pounds in 1850 to 144,861 net pounds in 1855. By 1855, H. Nelthropp owned the estate, with 120 acres in sugar cultivation and 300 acres in other crops. A drought in 1856 caused a significant drop in sugar production to 59,886 net pounds in 1857.

In 1862, the area in sugar cultivation fell to 100 acres, and Nelthropp employed 42 workers. Sugar production, expressed in hogsheads, averaged 78 hogsheads from 1815 to 1861 but dropped to 39 hogsheads in 1862.

The following decade saw output figures fluctuate, from a peak of 75,671 pounds and 50 hogsheads in 1866 to a low of 22,425 pounds and 15 hogsheads in 1869. The St. Croix sugar industry faced numerous challenges, including hurricanes, earthquakes, prolonged droughts, epidemics, and economic hardships. Many planters abandoned their estates or went bankrupt.

== Julius Arendrup ==
Engine North Elevation, North East Elevation - Estate Rust-Op-Twist, Steam Engine and Cane Mill, Christiansted, St. Croix, VI HAER VI,1-NORT,1-A- (sheet 3 of 4)

Ownership records for Rust-op-Twist are missing between 1862 and 1873. In 1874, Julius Arendrup received the estate. Sugar production in 1876 dropped due to severe drought, with only 16,205 pounds produced. By 1877, it reached its lowest level, with just 15,405 pounds. During 1874–1878, the Danish government offered short-term loans to struggling planters. Factors like the costly transportation of produce and falling prices made it nearly impossible to sustain profitable cultivation. These challenges marked the end of an era for sugar production at Rust-op-Twist, reflecting the broader struggles faced by the St. Croix sugar industry during this period.

In 1878, during the St. Croix "Great Burn" and labor riot, locally called "Fireburn", according to the St. Croix Avis the Arendrup family sought refuge in the bushes on the hillside as their residence and works were consumed by the flames. While the steam machinery survived, little else remained. In June 1879, a notice announced that Rust-op-Twist would be put up for auction at the request of Christiansted's Dealing Court, as they managed Mr. Julius Arendrup's bankruptcy. Although sugar production resumed on the estate in 1880, only 5,643 pounds (4 hogsheads) were produced from 29 acres under cultivation. Rust-op-Twist's sugar production from 1862 to 1880 averaged 28 hogsheads annually, with an average of 99 acres under sugar cultivation during the same period. In 1881, Rust-op-Twist operated under the control of Estate La Vallee, but this estate, also facing severe hardships, ceased operations in 1882.

Rust-op-Twist never produced sugar again after 1881, but it was considered for other crop cultivations. A group of Danish businessmen formed a "Danish Plantation Company" to experiment with alternative crops, aiming to alleviate the financial difficulties faced by St. Croix. This company purchased ten estates, including Rust-op-Twist, which were described as being in poor condition. The success of this venture is unknown.

== Current ownership ==
Since 1948, Rust-op-Twist has remained in private ownership, with George Dyer and his wife as the present owners. They have leased the property to the University of Texas Marine Science Institute. As of 1977, the St. Croix Landmarks Society had hopes of purchasing the remaining steam mill and restoring it to working condition.

== See also ==
- Danish West Indies
- St. Croix, USVI
- Sugar production in the Danish West Indies
