= La Vaughn Belle =

American artist

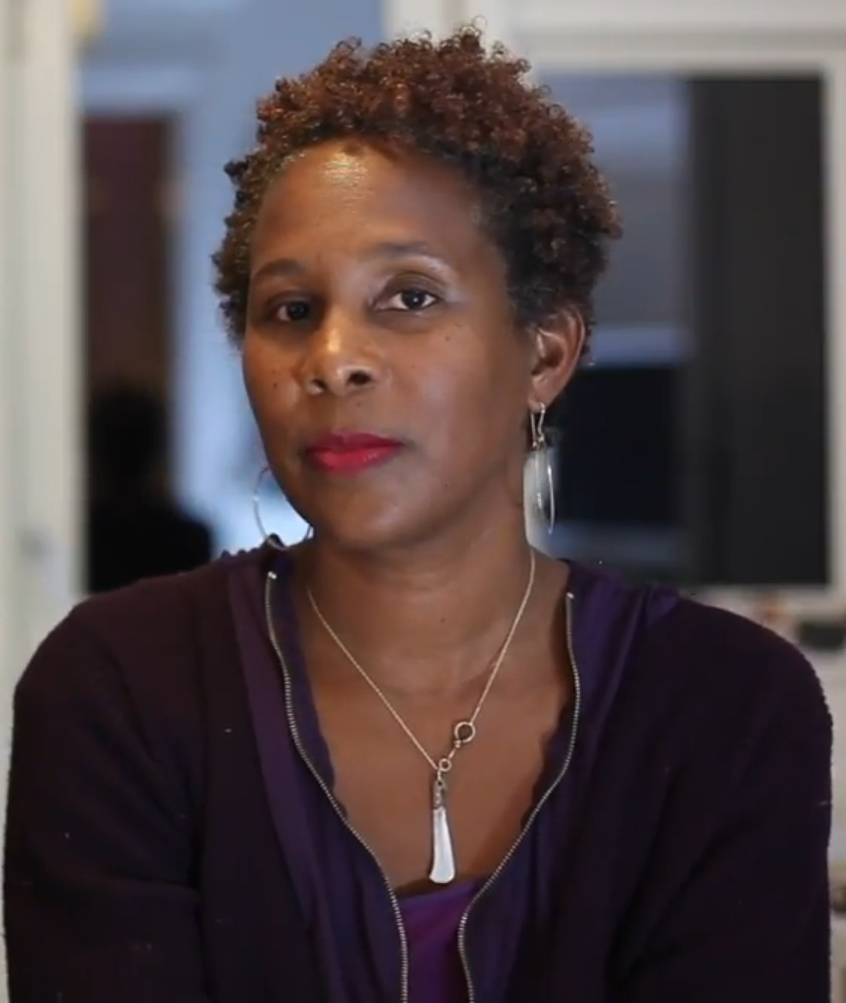
- portrait of La Vaughn Belle
- Born: 1974 (age 51–52); Tobago
- Education: Columbia University (BA and MA) & Instituto Superior de Arte in Havana, Cuba (MFA)
- Occupation: Artist
- Website: http://www.lavaughnbelle.com/

La Vaughn Belle (born 1974) is an artist from the United States Virgin Islands who uses a variety of media including drawings, paintings, woodwork, ceramics, photography, and video. She is best known for co-creating with Jeannette Ehlers the 23-foot tall statue “I Am Queen Mary,” the first public statue of a black woman in Denmark, featuring labor leader Mary Thomas.

== Biography ==
Belle was born in 1974 the village of Moriah on the island of Tobago, but moved to the St. Thomas, US Virgin Islands when she was an infant and considers herself a native. Her mother is from Tobago and her father is from Barbados. She attended Columbia University in New York, and in her junior year she took a painting class and decided to become an artist. However, she had already switched her major from Pre-Med to English, and couldn't switch majors again. After receiving her bachelor's degree, she started teaching and moved back to St. Croix. She received an MFA at el Instituto Superior de Arte in Cuba in 2005.

== Works ==
Belle considers herself a contemporary artist and has stated she likes her art to speak "in layers." She seeks to undermine and challenge the European-based hierarchical caste system in the Caribbean, which she believes places people of African descent at the bottom of the social pyramid. She regularly incorporates colonial artifacts into her work.

=== "Somebody’s Been Sitting In My Chair" ===
Belle created the video performance “Somebody’s Been Sitting In My Chair” where Goldilocks walks into a Great House. Inside displays several people sitting in a planter's chair. It is meant to reflect the taboo surrounding not being able to touch anything in a Caribbean Great House.

=== “Chaney” pieces ===
These feature broken ceramics from China and Denmark that often resurface after it rains in the Virgin Islands.

=== "I Am Queen Mary" statue ===
Denmark was an active participant in the transatlantic slave trade and greatly benefitted from it, though has never officially apologized. Belle co-created the statue "I Am Queen Mary" with fellow black artist Jeannette Ehlers to challenge "Denmark’s collective memory" about slavery. The 23-foot statue depicts Mary Thomas, who helped lead the 1878 "Fireburn" labor riot in St. Croix where workers in the Danish West Indies staged a protest. She sits on a peacock chair, recalling “the iconic 1967 photograph of Huey P. Newton, founder of the Black Panther Party” and the plinth incorporates “coral cut from the ocean by enslaved Africans gathered from ruins of the foundations of historic buildings on St. Croix.” In one hand she holds a torch, and the other holds a West Indian cane bill (a tool for cutting sugarcane cutting), which the artists state symbolizes the “resistance strategies” of the enslaved people who toiled in Danish colonies.
