= Nancy Rabalais =

American marine ecologist

- Born: Wichita Falls, Texas
- Education: Texas A&M University–Kingsville
- Alma mater: University of Texas at Austin
- Scientific career
- Fields: Marine ecology

Nancy Nash Rabalais is an American marine ecologist, and Professor and Shell Endowed Chair in Oceanography and Wetland Studies at Louisiana State University. She researches dead zones in the marine environment and is an expert in eutrophication and nutrient pollution.

== Biography ==
Nancy Rabalais was born in Wichita Falls, Texas, the second of four children of Kathryn Charlotte Preusch and Stephen Anthony Nash, a mechanical engineer. Rabalais earned her B.S. in 1972 and her M.S. in 1975 from Texas A&M University–Kingsville. Rabalais worked at Padre Island National Seashore in 1975 and began as a research assistant at the University of Texas Marine Science Institute, Port Aransas Marine Laboratory for 4 years. She began further graduate studies in 1979, working towards her Ph.D., where she studied fiddler crabs endemic to South Texas. She received her Ph.D. in zoology from the University of Texas at Austin in 1983.

Since 1985, Rabalais has studied the Gulf of Mexico's dead zone off the coast of Louisiana, the largest hypoxic zone in the United States. Along with two other researchers, she linked hypoxic zones in the Gulf with Mississippi River estuaries in 1985 through ocean mapping oxygen levels. This work was highlighted on the covers of BioScience in 1991 and Nature in 1994. This research is credited to the creation of the U.S. Environmental Protection Agency's Mississippi River/Gulf of Mexico Hypoxia Task Force which was established in 1997 to manage and control hypoxia and dead zones in the region.

She joined the Louisiana Universities Marine Consortium (LUMCON) in 1983 and, with funding from the National Oceanic and Atmospheric Administration (NOAA), identified a substantial hypoxic zone that had been affecting shrimpers.

Rabalais has testified to Congress on the problem of nutrient pollution from agricultural and storm water runoff.

She was the president of the nonprofit Coastal and Estuarine Research Federation from 1997 to 1999.

She referred to the 2010 Deepwater Horizon oil spill as an "oilmageddon".

She was the executive director of LUMCON from 2005 to 2016, where she was also a professor. She became a Professor/Shell Endowed Chair in Oceanography and Coastal Studies, Louisiana State University, in 2016, where she is still employed. She is also director of the Coastal Waters Consortium and has chaired the Ocean Studies Board of the National Research Council. Up until 2023, she led annual research surveys to determine the size of the dead zone, which data are used to identify the progress towards Mississippi River/Gulf of Mexico Hypoxia Task Force's goal of a dead zone 1,900 square miles or smaller by 2035.

Rabalais was the recipient of an NOAA Environmental Hero Award and Aldo Leopold Leadership Program Fellowship in 1999, the 17th Annual Heinz Award (with special focus on the environment) in 2011 and MacArthur Fellowship in 2012. Rabalais was elected to the National Academy of Sciences in 2021.

In 2012, she and several colleagues started the Coastal Waters Consortium, which focused on the effects of the BP oil spill on the Gulf of Mexico's ecosystems and food webs within.

Rabalais has been published in the journals Biogeosciences, BioScience, Nature, and Science.

She is married to R. Eugene Turner, an LSU colleague whom she has published work with before, including their book Coastal Hypoxia: Consequences for Living Resources and Ecosystems. His work focuses inshore, while hers is in the waters of the Gulf. They have a daughter, Emily.

== Awards ==
- Rachel Carson Award Lecture, American Geophysical Union (2012)
