= Estate Grove Place =

- U.S. National Register of Historic Places
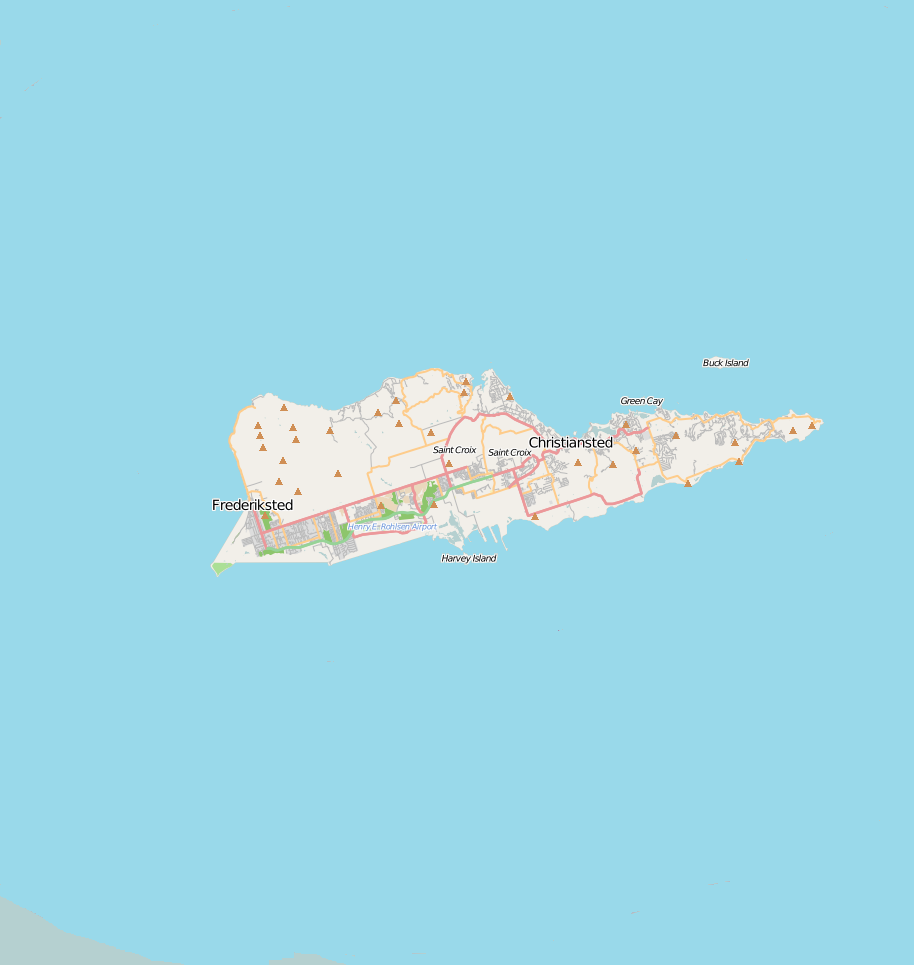
- Location within Saint Croix, US Virgin Islands Location within the U.S. Virgin Islands
- Location: 4 miles (6.4 km) east of Frederiksted off Centerline Road, St. Croix, U.S. Virgin Islands
- Coordinates: 17°43′39″N 64°49′25″W
- Area: 2 acres (0.81 ha)
- Built: 1851
- NRHP reference No.: 78002721
- Added to NRHP: July 17, 1978

Estate Grove Place, at Grove Place in the Northwest subdistrict near Frederiksted on St. Croix, U.S. Virgin Islands, is a historic plantation which was listed on the National Register of Historic Places in 1978.

It includes ruins of a sugar factory, a tall chimney, and a wagon depot with 23 arched bays. The factory ruins include a boiling room area which is 30 by 92 feet (9.1 m × 28.0 m) in plan. The chimney is square and tapered, rising about 80 feet (24 m) from a 12 by 12 feet (3.7 m × 3.7 m) base.

== Gallery ==
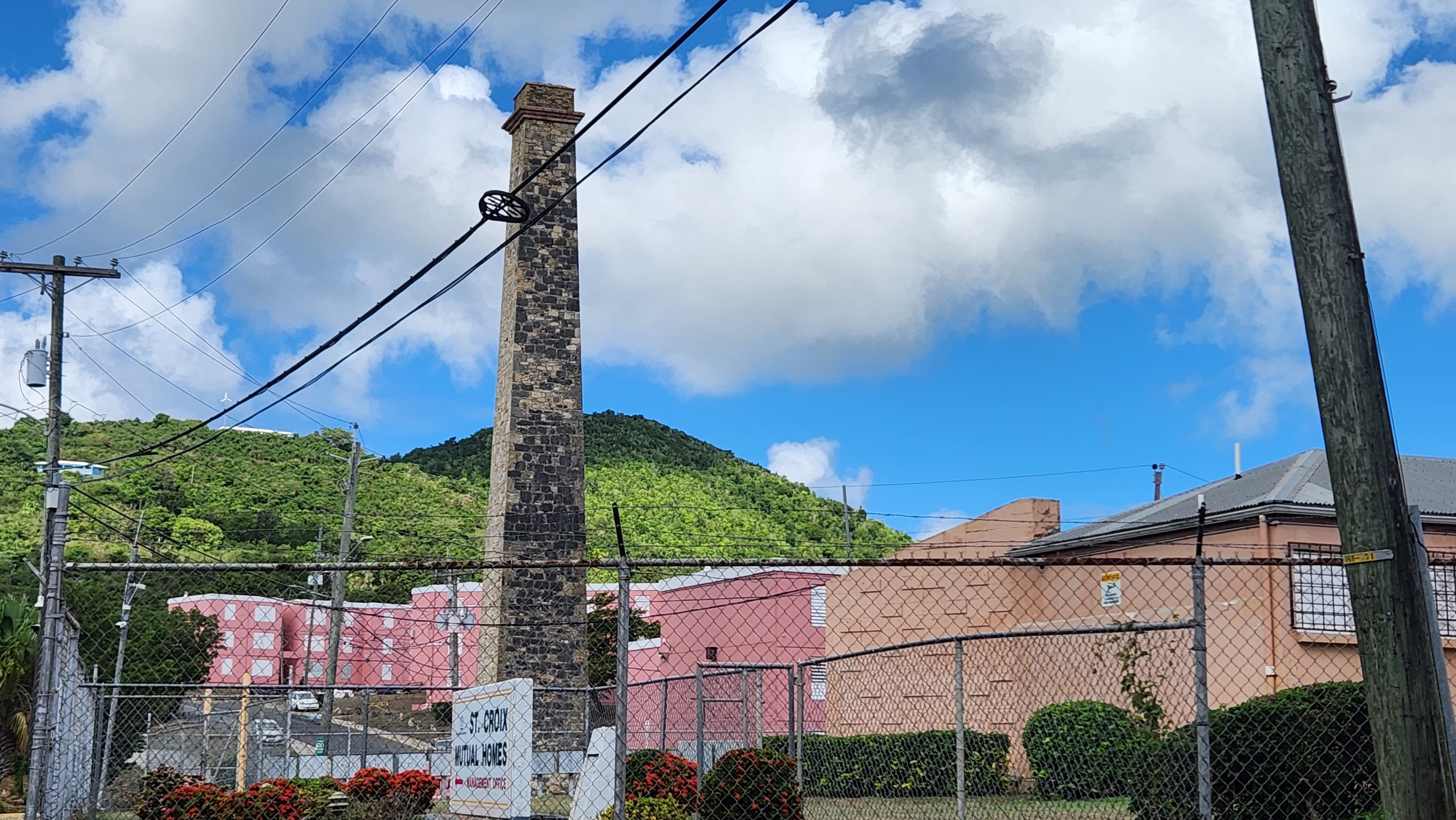
Estate Grove Place Steam mill smokestack

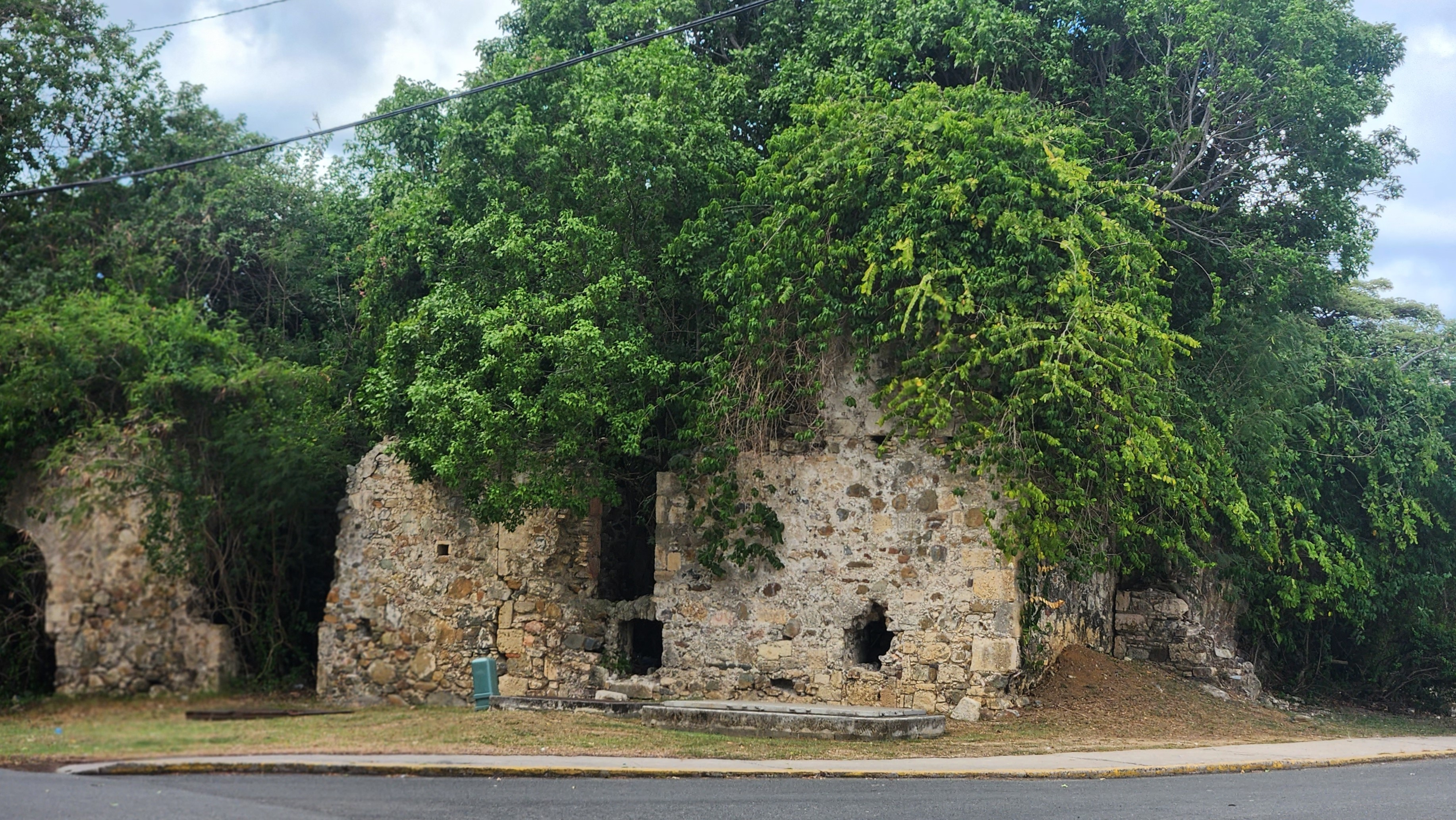
GroveRuins20230926

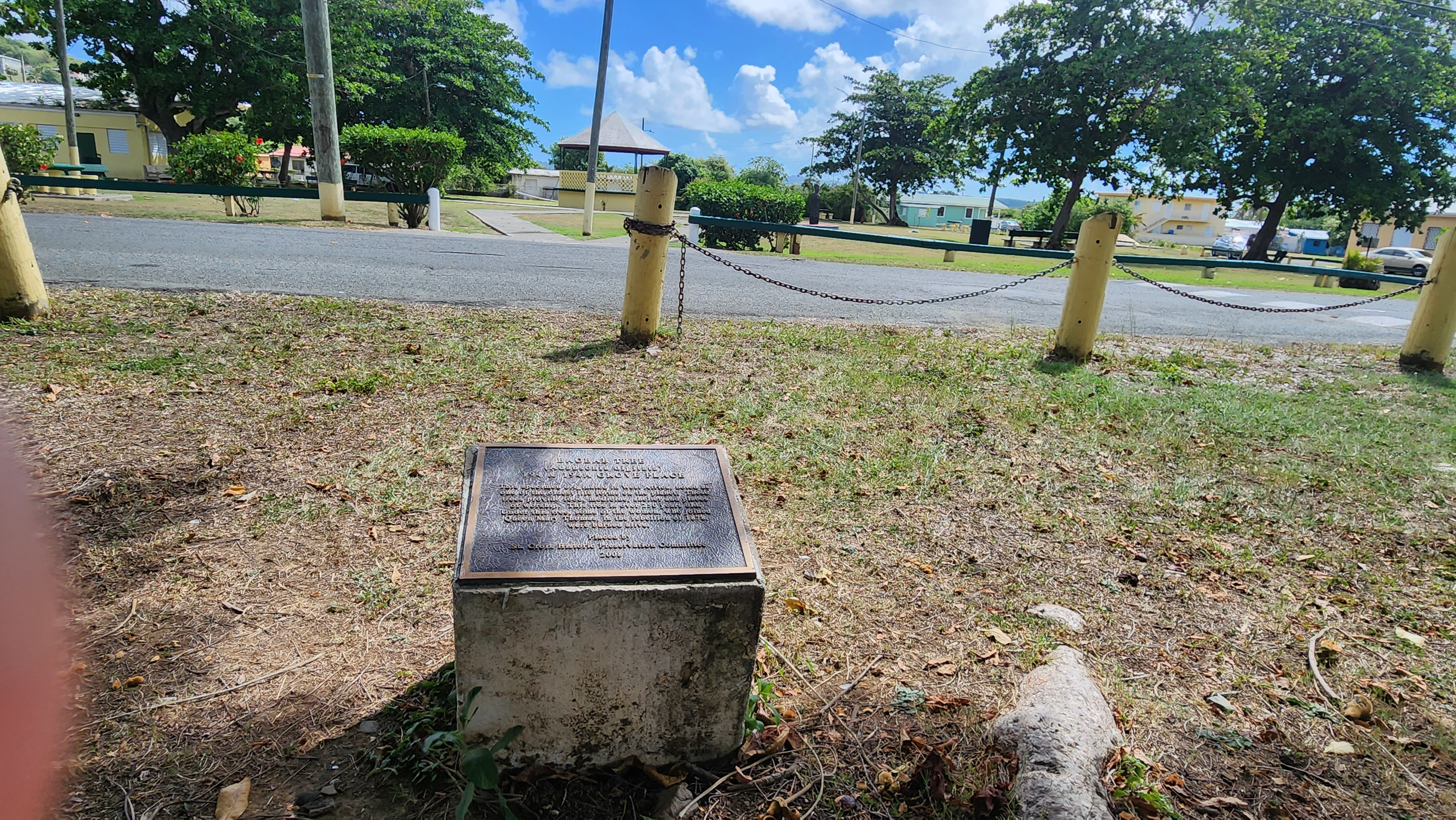
Memorial Plaque 20230926
