= Jeannette Ehlers =

Danish-Trinidadian artist

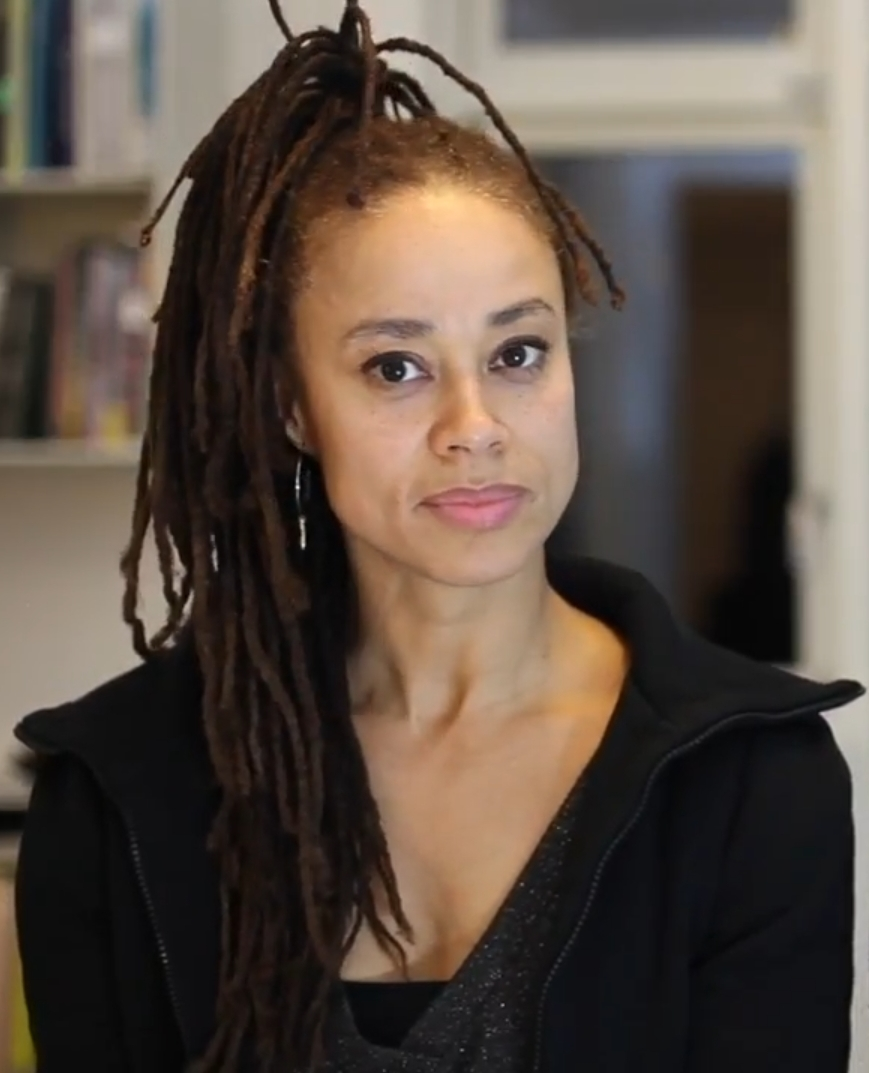
- Born: 1973 in Holstebro, Denmark
- Education: The Royal Danish Academy of Fine Arts in 2006
- Occupation: Multifaceted Artist
- Website: https://www.jeannetteehlers.dk/

Jeannette Ehlers (born 1973) is a Danish-Trinidadian artist based in Copenhagen. Her work address's themes and questions around race, colonialism, and the Black memory/history in Denmark. Ehlers is a multifaceted artist who uses a variety of different mediums to convey her narrative and perspective on the lost memory of Black history in Denmark. Ehlers is an experimental artist, her art takes different forms as she uses different mediums such as photography, video, installation, sculpture and performance. Being black in a predominately white area in Denmark opened up an abundance of questions for Ehlers about her black ancestry and history. Ehlers had felt as if a lot of her emotions and history was suppressed from her, and she channeled these feelings and emotions into her art. She is well-known for co-creating the public art project, a monumental public sculpture, I Am Queen Mary with La Vaugh Belle in 2018. It is the first public statue of a Black woman in Denmark and depicts Mary Thomas, leader of the 1878 St. Croix labor riot.

== Biography ==
Jeannette Ehlers was born in 1973 in Holstebro, Denmark. Ehlers mother was white Danish, and her father was Afro-Caribbean Trinidadian. From a very early age Ehlers knew she wanted to be an artist. When she was 14 years old, she modeled for a designer school in Denmark, and that influenced her decision to become an artist. Ehlers started to concentration in visual art through drawing during her late teens. Ehlers then applies to a couple art classes during her early 20s. She then applied for The Royal Danish Academy of Fine Arts in Denmark, which only accept a small number of people during each application period, and she did not get accepted the first time around. She wasn't accepted to The Royal Danish Academy of Fine Arts until she was about 24 years old.

== Works ==
=== "I Am Queen Mary" statue ===
Denmark was an active participant in the transatlantic slave trade and greatly benefitted from it, though has never officially apologized. Ehlers co-created the statue "I Am Queen Mary" with fellow black artist La Vaughn Belle to challenge "Denmark’s collective memory" about slavery. The 23-foot statue depicts Mary Thomas, who helped lead the 1878 "Fireburn" labor riot in St. Croix where workers in the Danish West Indies staged a protest. She sits on a peacock chair, recalling “the iconic 1967 photograph of Huey P. Newton, founder of the Black Panther Party” and the plinth incorporates “coral cut from the ocean by enslaved Africans gathered from ruins of the foundations of historic buildings on St. Croix.” In one hand she holds a torch, and the other holds a West Indian cane bill (a tool for cutting sugarcane cutting), which the artists state symbolizes the “resistance strategies” of the enslaved people who toiled in Danish colonies.
