= Mary Thomas (labor leader) =

Leader of an 1878 labor riot on St. Croix (1848–1905)

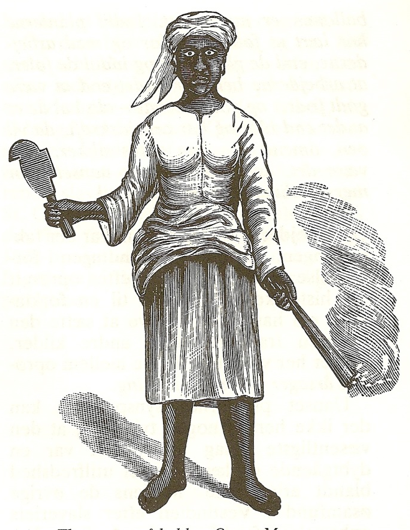
- Queen Mary Thomas, depicted wielding a torch and cane knife, in Charles E. Taylor's "Leaflets from the Danish West Indies" (1888)
- Born: 1848; Antigua
- Died: 1905 (aged 56–57)
- Known for: led 1878 St. Croix labor riot

Mary Thomas, known as Queen Mary (c. 1848–1905), was one of the leaders of the 1878 "Fireburn" labor riot, or uprising, on the island of St. Croix in the Danish West Indies.

== Biography ==
Mary Thomas was from Antigua and arrived in St. Croix in the 1860s to take work on the plantations in the island. In 1878 she resided at the Sprat Hall plantation. She had three children but never married. Before the uprising, she had been sentenced for theft and for mistreating her children. Historians have suggested that such sentences were used by the authorities to discredit people who opposed them.

After the 1848 emancipation of enslaved Africans in the Danish West Indies, an 1849 labor law fixed salaries and labor conditions for all plantation workers and prohibited bargaining for better wages or work conditions. This made plantation work unattractive, and many workers opted to leave the plantations and the islands to seek better conditions elsewhere. The government reacted to the labor shortage by making it harder for workers to leave the islands, demanding health certificates and charging fees for passports. When wages were to be negotiated in the fall of 1878, the workers' demands were denied, and new harsh conditions for traveling were imposed. This sparked the so-called Fireburn riots, which have been called the largest labor riot in Danish history, during which more than 50 plantations were burned.

Because of her role as a leader during the uprising, Mary Thomas came to be known as "Queen Mary". The workers chose her and two other women, "Queen Agnes" and "Queen Matilda", as queens to perform ritual and celebratory functions during the uprising. Thomas played a leading role and referred to herself as a "captain" in the rebellion. Allegedly, during one the uprisings Thomas had called for those unwilling to participate to be decapitated.

She was arrested and tried with other leaders of the labor uprising. During the trial of the labor leaders she gave witness testimony against another leader, Thomas Graydon, also known as "Colonel Peter", who was sentenced to death. Mary Thomas was also sentenced to death for arson and looting but had her sentence commuted to life imprisonment. She was transferred to Copenhagen and placed at Women's Prison, Christianshavn, in 1882, but in 1887 she was sent back to Christiansted, St. Croix, to serve the remainder of her sentence.

== Legacy ==
Thomas obtained semi-mythical status in the Virgin Islands oral tradition, where a popular song commemorates her actions in the uprising:

Queen Mary, ah where you gon' go burn?
Queen Mary, ah where you gon' go burn?
Don' ask me nothin' t'all
Just geh me de match an oil
Bassin Jailhouse, ah deh de money dey

The Queen Mary Highway on St. Croix is named after her.

In 2018, the artists Jeannette Ehlers and La Vaughn Belle created a monumental public sculpture, I Am Queen Mary, depicting a 7-metre-tall (23 ft) statue of Mary Thomas seated on a throne wielding a torch and a cane knife. The statue was unveiled in Copenhagen in 2018; it is Denmark's first public monument to a Black woman.

A book titled Fireburn The Screenplay: A story of passion ignited, based on the history of St. Croix written by Caribbean-American writer Angela Golden Bryan was published in 2018. The book pays tribute to Queen Mary and other leaders of the revolt.

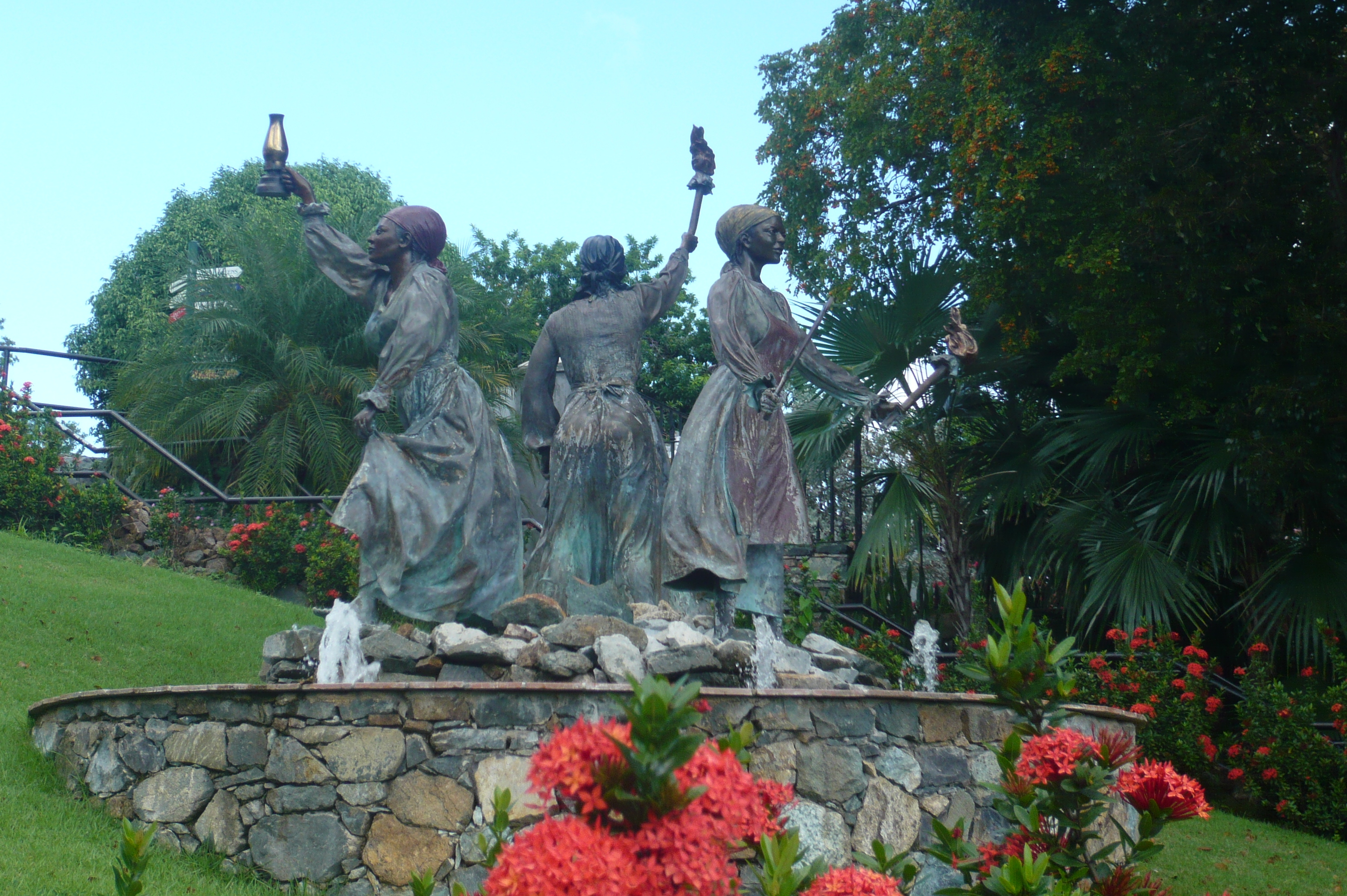
The Three Queens Fountain at Blackbeard's Castle, St. Thomas honors Queens Mary, Agnes, and Mathilda

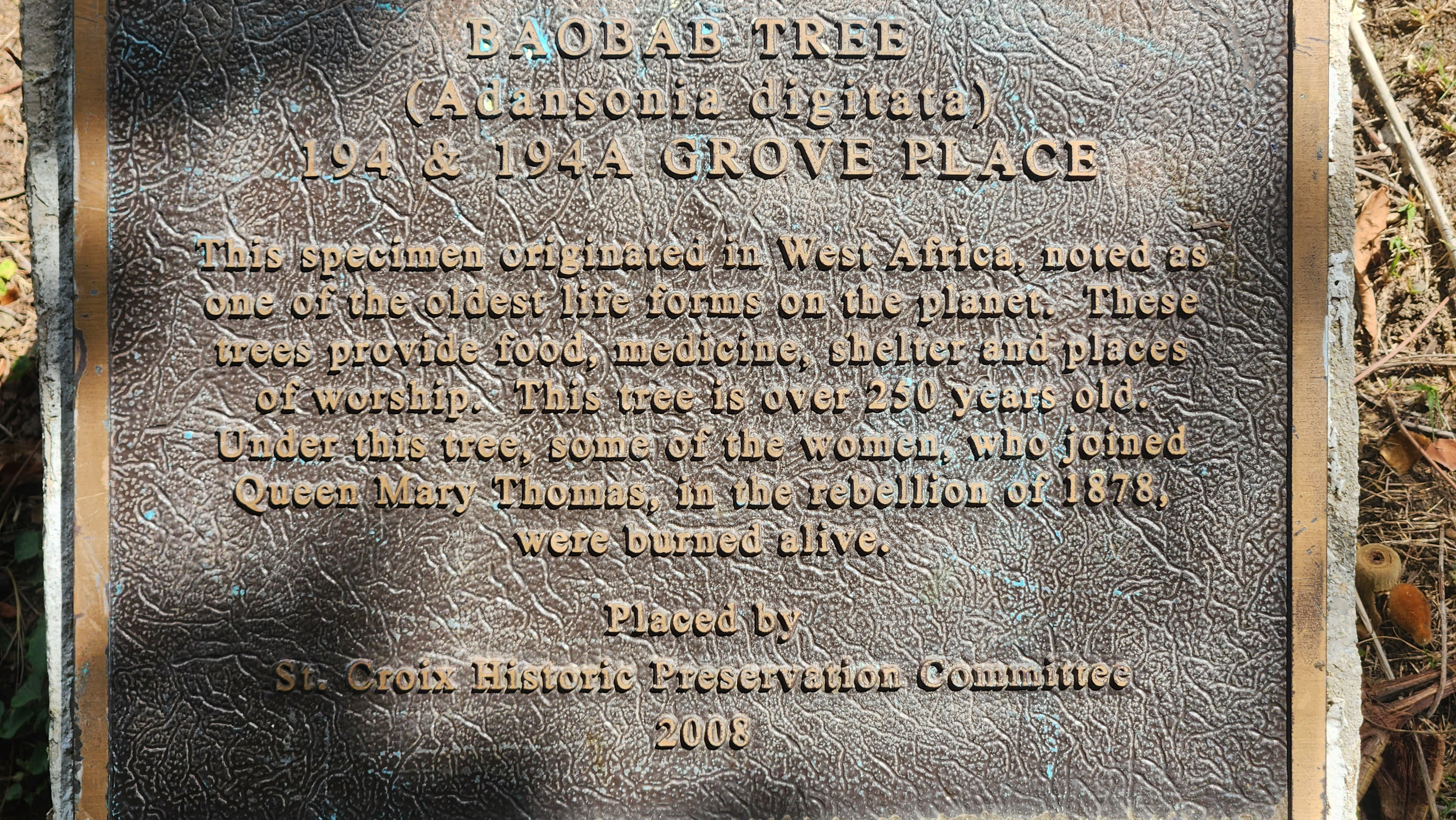
Baobab Historic Marker at Grove Place, U.S. Virgin Islands

== See also ==
- Slavery in the Danish West Indies
