= University of Texas at Austin Marine Science Institute =

University marine science institution

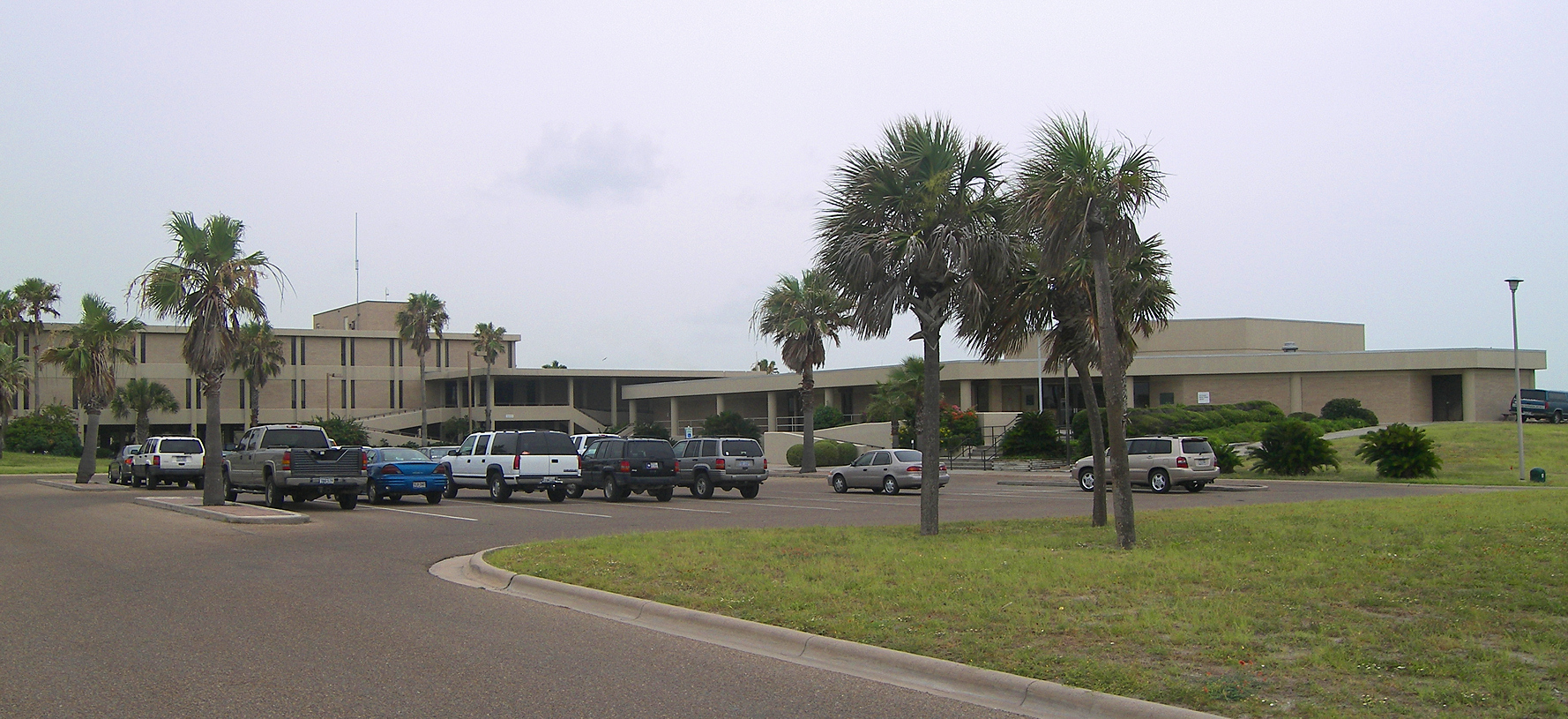
- Established: 1941; 85 years ago
- Research type: Marine Sciences
- Director: Sharon Z Herzka
- Faculty: 16
- Students: 41
- Location: 750 Channel View Dr, Port Aransas, Texas, 78373, United States; 27.84°N 97.05°W
- Operating agency: University of Texas at Austin
- Website: utmsi.utexas.edu

The University of Texas at Austin Marine Science Institute (UTMSI) is a research institute located in Port Aransas, Texas, and affiliated with the University of Texas at Austin.

Founded in 1941, UTMSI currently has 15 faculty members and 35 graduate students. Notable alumni include Nancy Rabalais. Facilities on the main campus include wet and dry lab space, a wildlife rehabilitation "keep", dormitories, boat storage, and offices. UTMSI has received funding appropriated by the Texas State Legislature since 1971. In 2021, these funds totaled approximately $4.5 million.

== History ==
UTMSI was established in 1941 and counts Gordon Gunter and Howard T. Odum among its notable former directors.

Although the modern day fleet consists entirely of small watercraft, from 1971 - 2006 UTMSI operated an 80 ft research vessel, the R/V Longhorn.

In 2011, UTMSI expanded with the addition of a new Estuarine Research Center which is part of the National Estuarine Research Reserve program. UTMSI together with the Estuarine Research Center operates the Bay Education Center in Rockport, Texas.

In 2017, UTMSI suffered $45 million in damages due to Hurricane Harvey.

In 2017, a new site of the Long Term Ecological Research Network was founded with UTMSI scientists as principal investigators.

== Academics ==
Work at UTMSI spans the globe with local work throughout the Texas Coastal Bend. Areas of research include:

- Fish Physiology and Ecology - investigation of living marine resources, especially finfish and shellfish. This work has included studies on the effects of oil spills on marine life. In 2008, UTMSI scientists published the first account of the brown tide forming species Aureoumbra lagunensis.
- Ecosystem Dynamics - integrates diverse fields of science analyzing how plants, animals, water, air, minerals and mankind interact in coastal ecosystems. This work has included studies on microplastics pollution.
- Biogeochemistry - research on foodwebs and understanding the delicate balance and flow of nutrients that are crucial for sustaining marine ecosystems. This work has included studies on the role of groundwater transport in carbon and nutrient cycling in Arctic coastal ecosystems

UTMSI offers two graduate degrees in Marine Science, a thesis-based Master of Science (MS) degree and a Doctor of Philosophy (PhD). Graduate students take courses based in Port Aransas and Austin.

== Notable faculty ==
- Lee A. Fuiman
- Mark Lever
