= Simply Delicioso =

- Starring: Ingrid Hoffmann
- Country of origin: United States
- No. of episodes: 39

Production
- Running time: 30 minutes

Original release
- Network: Cooking Channel

Simply Delicioso is a cooking show hosted by Ingrid Hoffmann, wherein she typically teaches the audience Latin-American and Latin-American-style recipes. A recipe book of the same name was also published.
