= 1878 St. Croix labor riot =

Uprising in the Danish West Indies

Fireburn
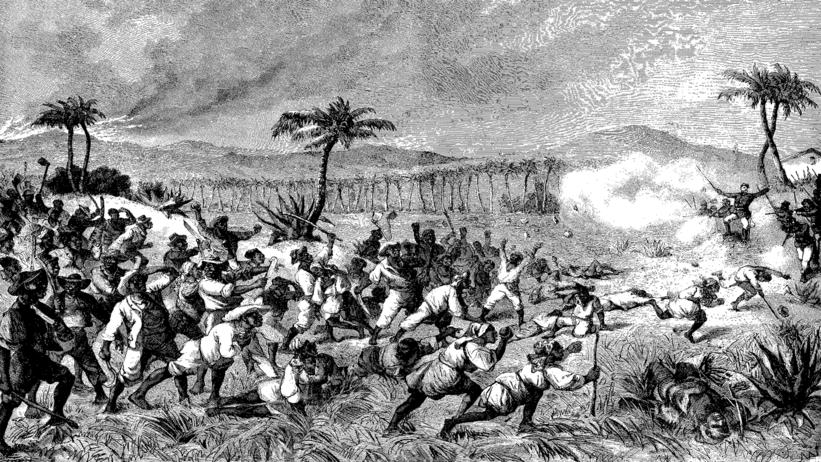
- Illustration from Illustreret Tidende, November 1878.
- Date: 1 October – mid-October 1878
- Location: Danish West Indies, modern day US Virgin Islands
- Caused by: Lack of freedom for the laborers, debt peonage
- Goals: More freedom to the laborers
- Methods: Deadly riots, protests
- Result: Revolt suppressed 879 acres burned

Parties
| Denmark: (Denmark) Danish West Indies | Queens of the Fireburn; Labor Rioters |

Lead figures
| (Denmark) Janus August Garde | "Queen Mary" Thomas "Queen Agnes" Salomon "Queen Mathilda" McBean |

Casualties and losses
| 2 soldiers | 12 laborers |
- 14 women 60 laborers

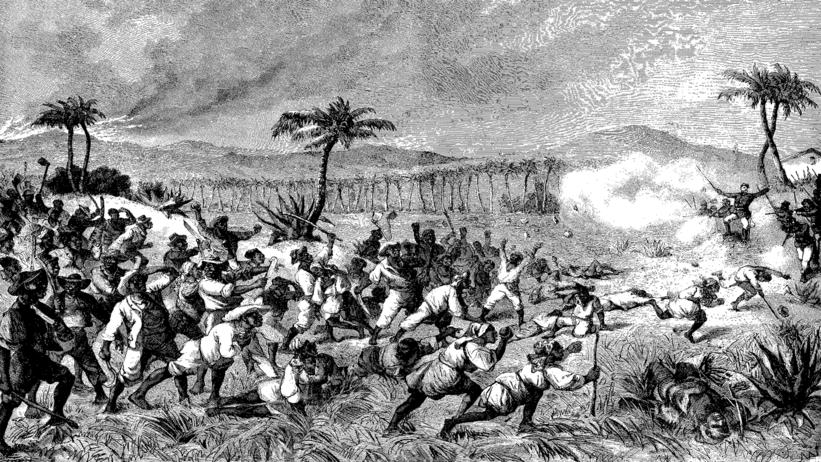
Illustration from Illustreret Tidende, November 1878.

The St. Croix Labor Riot of 1878, also known as the Fireburn, was a labor riot in the Danish West Indies, now the U.S. Virgin Islands, illustrating the lasting effects of the slavery and systematic exploitation of liberated laborers. Even after emancipation was declared in 1848, former enslaved peoples of African descent were forced into contracts that would keep them working and living in harsh conditions. On October 1, 1878, Contract Day, a protest against these injustices erupted into a rebellion, led by four women dubbed the "Four Queens": Mary Thomas, Axelene "Agnes" Salomon, Mathilda Mcbean, and Susana Abramsen. This uprising is still remembered today as a symbol of resistance to systematic oppression.

== Events leading up to the riot ==
During this period, St. Croix was controlled by white Danish colonials, however, a large portion of the population consisted of both enslaved Indigenous people, who were descendants of Arawak and Carib Indians, and slaves imported from Africa by the settlers. The Indigenous population, though marginalized and displaced by colonial practices, played a crucial role in shaping the cultural landscape of St. Croix. The integration between both indigenous and colonial cultures was not merely a sign of oppression but also showcased resiliency and identity formation for the enslaved peoples, showcasing how both people of African descent and the colonized native born people of St. Croix resisted complete creolization. This is especially important to recognize due to the fact that the opposition towards fully adapting colonial ideals directly relates to also resisting the hierarchal makeup of the region. Throughout the pre-emancipation period, Danish colonials enforced these frameworks by using "space to reinforce the social order, make claims to identity, and impose meanings on the cultural categories that people create" which heavily influenced the hierarchal structures that became embedded in the frameworks of not only the government, but the country as a whole. St. Croix was a place that was entirely built on the basis of slave labor and racial inequalities, serving as a microcosm of colonial exploitation where the intersections of race, labor, and power perpetuated systemic oppression.

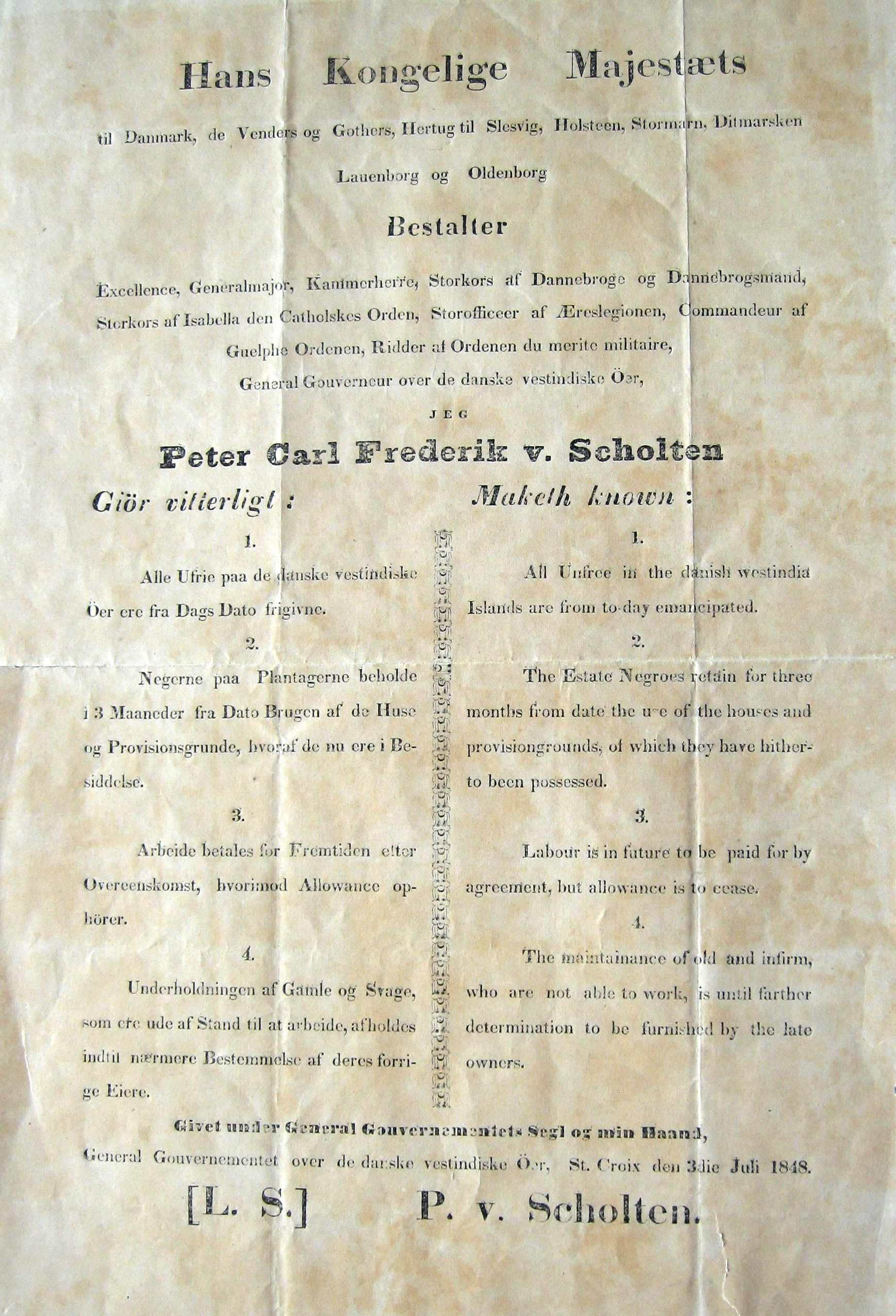
Emancipation proclamation distributed by Governor-General Peter von Scholten in 1848 declaring all enslaved individuals in the Danish West Indies as free

However, in July 1848, the slaves of the Danish West Indies staged a large-scale uprising against the oppressive government. This was mainly influenced by both the Haitian Revolution and a revolution in nearby Martinique, where in both, enslaved peoples gained freedom from France. This revolt was led by a man called John Gottlieb, better known by fellow enslaved individuals as "Buddahoe", who marched with thousands of enslaved people to Frederiksted, demanding immediate freedom. These efforts culminated in then Governor-General Peter von Scholten announcing emancipation, declaring all people in the Danish West Indies as free. For many laborers this freedom was short-lived, as plantation owners, who sought to maintain control, quickly began devising new regulations. Governor-General Hansen held a conference in fear that the newly freed people would not work or would want better wages. This resulted in the Labor Act, effective January 1849. The now free laborers were forced by law to sign contracts that bound them and their families to the same plantations where they had previously worked, causing the now free laborers to become debt peon slaves again in all but name, in turn reinforcing a 'slave-master relationship'. These contracts enforced the already present racial hierarchies put in place in the Virgin Islands, where the free people of color navigated a complex landscape that mitigated their ability to gain social and political standing. This system stems from the inherent marginalization of the Indigenous people by Danish settler colonials, and the existence of a category of free indigenous people disrupted the system created in which "white was virtually a synonym for freedom, power, and privilege."

The Labor Act also created fixed salaries and labor conditions for all plantation workers, eliminating any opportunities for bargaining. As plantation work became increasingly unattractive, many workers left the island to seek better opportunities. In response, the government made it harder for workers to leave the island, such as charges fees for passports and demanded health certificates. In the fall of 1878, workers demands for increased wages and labor conditioners were once again denied and increasingly strict laws for traveling were imposed.

== Contract Day ==
In October 1878 during Contract Day, an annual holiday, laborers gathered in Frederiksted to demand higher wages and better working conditions. Although it was initially a peaceful gathering, the crowd began to become violent after rumors circulated, including a rumor that a laborer had been hospitalized, but was mistreated and died in police custody. The rioters threw stones and the Danish soldiers retaliated with gunfire. As violence escalated, the soldiers barricaded themselves inside a fort. Unable to scale the gates to access the fort, the rioters turned their focus on the town and began looting it, using torches to burn many buildings and plantations.

On October 4, British, French, and American warships arrived and offered to help stop the riot. But Governor Garde was confident he and his men had the situation under control and turned the ships away, though some soldiers borrowed guns from the British ships. The next day, Garde ordered all laborers to return to their plantations or be declared "rebels". Laborers were forbidden to leave their plantations without written permission from the plantation owner. By mid-October, the riot had died down and peace was returning to the islands.

== Queens of the Fireburn ==
Among the prominent leaders of the riot were three women, Mary "Queen Mary" Thomas, "Queen Agnes", and "Queen Mathilda." The three were sentenced to prison, and served their terms in Denmark. A folk song from the 1880s, "Queen Mary", was written about Mary's role in the riot.

In 2004, historian Wayne James uncovered Danish documents, including photographs of the prison where the women served their sentences, a storybook they wrote, and "a host of other historically significant documents and photos." According to him, these documents reveal the existence of a fourth "queen", Susanna Abramsen, who was known as "Bottom Belly."

Mary Thomas is often regarded as the most prominent leader in the rebellion and an icon to this day. At the time of Fireburn, Mary was in her forties and had three children. Prior to the revolt, Mary had controversial sentences for theft and child mistreatment which historians suggest were used by authorities as a sort of oppression for anyone that opposed their rule.

While not as famous as Queen Mary, Queen Agnes played a prominent role in rallying the workers, particularly in the southern part of the island. The youngest of the queens, Queen Mathilda was only 21 at the time of the rebellion. Along with Queen Agnes, she performed rituals and celebrations during the uprising. Although not known about until recent research brought her name to light, Queen Susanna was another leading figure in the revolt. She was given the nickname "Bottom Belly" which symbolized her strength and resilience.

== Aftermath ==
The riots caused great destruction to property on the islands. 879 acres were burned, and the damage caused was estimated at hundreds of thousands of dollars. Direct casualties of the riot include the deaths of 60 black laborers and two soldiers, and 14 women who died in an explosion. In addition, 12 laborers were condemned to death and hanged on October 5, 1878. All 4 of the queens were also incarcerated and imprisoned for their involvement in the riot. A year after Fireburn, in October 1879, new contracts were written that would supposedly increase laborers' wages, but the contracts were weighted in favor of the plantation owners.

The three most significant results of the riots were that the labor contracts would no longer be enforced, laborers could buy land, and labor unions were formed.

== Legacy ==
The folk song titled "Queen Mary" is still popularly sung by schoolchildren and musicians across the Virgin Islands, encompassing the lyrics "don't ask me nothing at all, just pass me the match and oil".

In 2018 artists Jeannette Ehlers and La Vaughn Belle unveiled a 7-metre-tall (23 ft) statue of Mary Thomas, titled "I am Queen Mary," where she is seen seated on a throne with a cane knife and torch. Its installation in Copenhagen made the statue Denmark's first public monument to a black woman. Many aspects of it come from her Afro-Crucian background, where the statues base was built from coral cuts made by enslaved people from St. Croix and her face being formed from facial scans of the artists. The statue itself was the first public monument in Denmark and was created to be used as a form of remembrance of the Fireburn and what happened in St. Croix.

Angela Golden Bryan published a book in 2018 titled: Fireburn The Screenplay, which pays homage to the laborers who participated in the uprising as well as raises awareness of historical injustices.

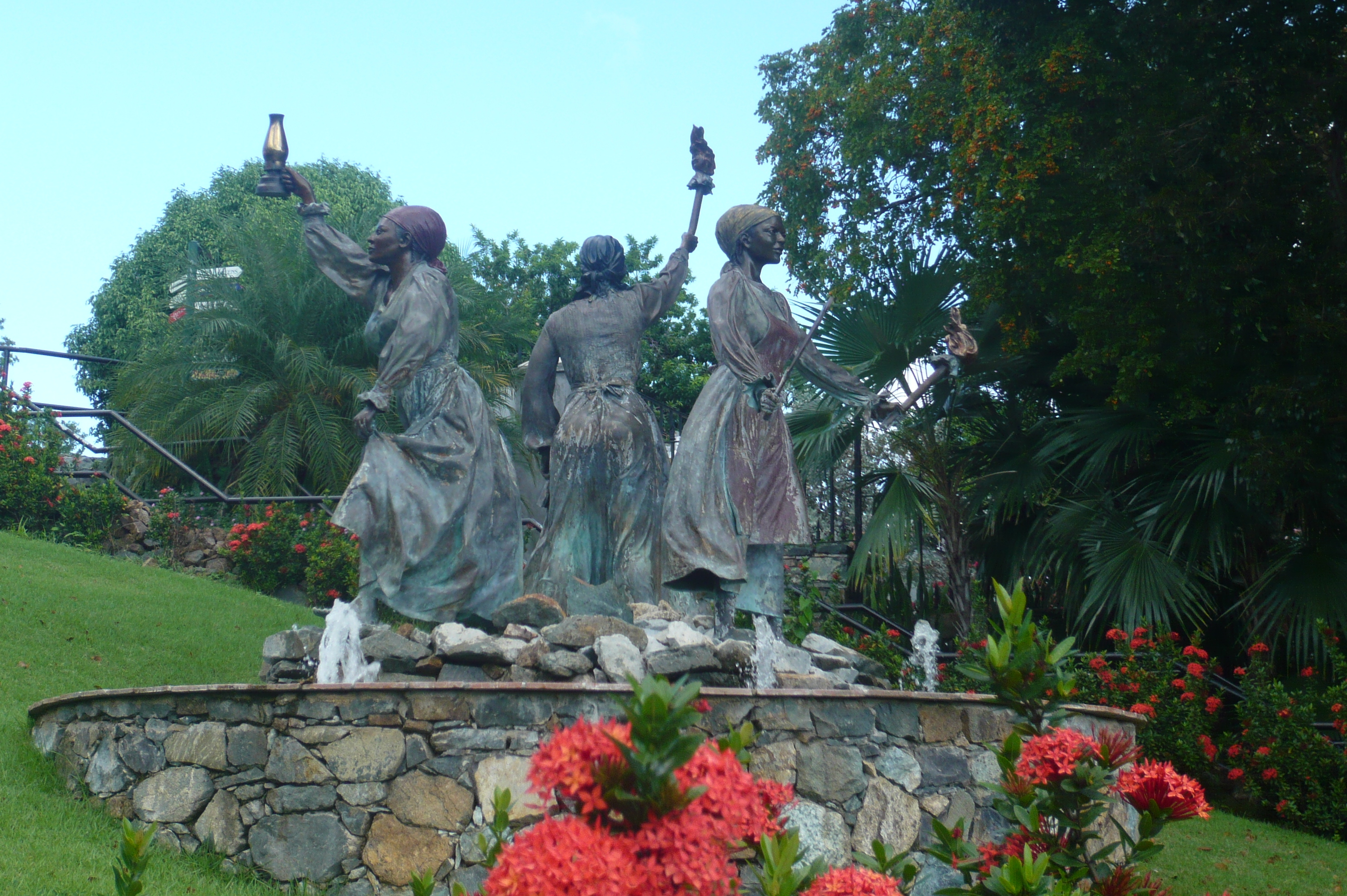
The Three Queens Fountain at Blackbeard's Castle, St. Thomas honors Queens Mary, Agnes, and Mathilda

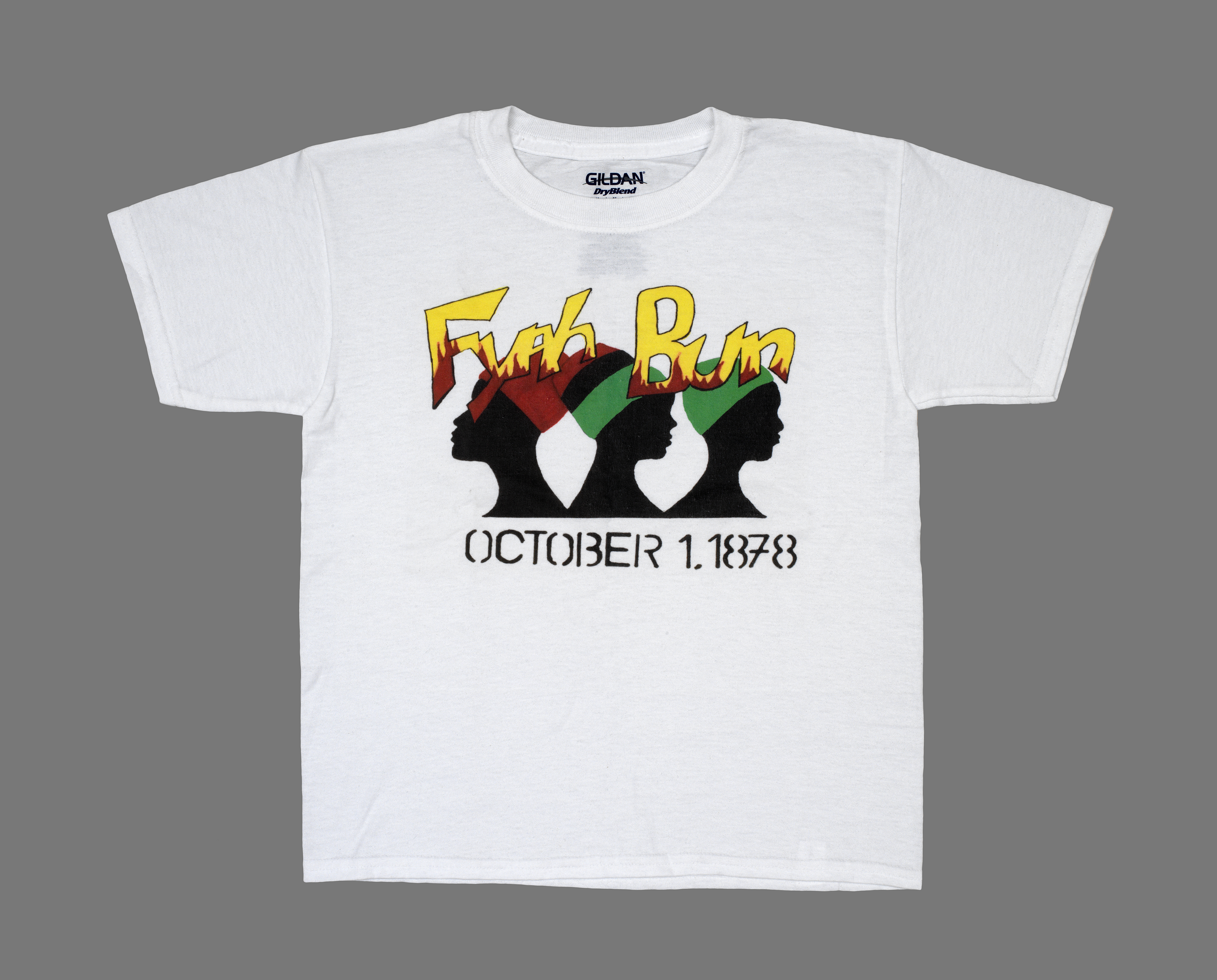
T-shirt with Fireburn and Three Queens motif, St. Croix 2015

== See also ==
- David Hamilton Jackson
- Estate Rust Op Twist
