= Sugarcane =

Several species of grass used for sugar production

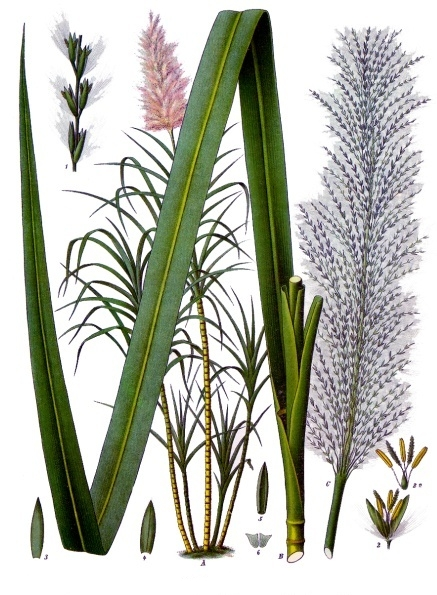
Saccharum officinarum

Sugarcane or sugar cane is a species of tall, perennial grass (in the genus Saccharum, tribe Andropogoneae) that is used for sugar production. The plants are 2–7 m (6–20 ft) tall with stout, jointed, fibrous stalks that are rich in sucrose, which accumulates in the stalk internodes. Sugarcanes belong to the grass family, Poaceae, an economically important flowering plant family that includes maize, wheat, rice, and sorghum, and many forage crops. It is native to New Guinea.

Sugarcane was an ancient crop of the Austronesian and Papuan people. The best evidence available today points to the New Guinea area as the site of the original domestication of Saccharum officinarum. It was introduced to Polynesia, Island Melanesia, and Madagascar in prehistoric times via Austronesian sailors. It was also introduced by Austronesian sailors to India and then to Southern China by 500 BC, via trade. The Persians and Greeks found "that reeds in India yield honey without bees", as said by Strabo, between the sixth and fourth centuries BC. They adopted and then spread sugarcane agriculture. By the eighth century, sugar was considered a luxurious and expensive spice from India, and merchant trading spread its use across the Mediterranean and North Africa. In the 18th century, sugarcane plantations began in the Caribbean, South American, Indian Ocean, and Pacific island nations. The need for sugar crop laborers became a major driver of large migrations, some people voluntarily accepting indentured servitude and others forcibly imported as slaves.

Grown in tropical and subtropical regions, sugarcane is the world's largest crop by production quantity, totalling 1.9 billion tonnes in 2020, with Brazil accounting for 40% of the world total. Sugarcane accounts for 79% of sugar produced globally (most of the rest is made from sugar beets). About 70% of the sugar produced comes from Saccharum officinarum and its hybrids. All sugarcane species can interbreed, and the major commercial cultivars are complex hybrids.

White sugar is produced from sugarcane in specialized mill factories. Sugarcane reeds are used to make pens, mats, screens, and thatch. The young, unexpanded flower head of Saccharum edule (duruka) is eaten raw, steamed, or toasted, and prepared in various ways in Southeast Asia, such as certain island communities of Indonesia as well as in Oceanic countries like Fiji.

== Etymology ==
The term sugarcane is a combination of two words: "sugar" and "cane". The former ultimately derives from Sanskrit शर्करा (śárkarā). As sugar was traded and spread West, this became سُكَّر (sukkar) in Arabic, saccharum or succarum in Latin, zucchero in Italian, and eventually sucre in both Middle French and Middle English. The second term "cane" began to be used alongside it as the crop was grown on plantations in the Caribbean.

== Characteristics ==
World production of primary crops by main commodities

Sugarcane, a perennial tropical grass, exhibits a unique growth pattern characterized by lateral shoots emerging at its base, leading to the development of multiple stems. These stems typically attain a height of 3 to 4 meters (approximately 10 to 13 feet) and possess a diameter of about 5 centimeters (approximately 2 inches). As these stems mature, they evolve into cane stalks, constituting a substantial portion of the entire plant, accounting for roughly 75% of its composition.

A fully mature cane stalk generally comprises a composition of around 11–16% fiber, 12–16% soluble sugars, 2–3% non-sugar carbohydrates, and 63–73% water content. The successful cultivation of sugarcane hinges on a delicate interplay of several factors, including climatic conditions, soil properties, the selection of specific varieties, and the timing of the harvest.

In terms of yield, the average production of cane stalk stands at 60–70 tonnes per hectare (equivalent to 24–28 long tons per acre or 27–31 short tons per acre) annually. However, this yield figure is not fixed and can vary significantly, ranging from 30 to 180 tonnes per hectare. This variance is contingent upon the level of knowledge applied and the approach to crop management embraced in the cultivation of sugarcane. Ultimately, the successful cultivation of this valuable crop demands a thoughtful integration of various factors to optimize its growth and productivity.

Sugarcane is a cash crop, but it is also used as livestock fodder. The sugarcane genome is one of the most complex plant genomes known, mostly due to interspecific hybridization and polyploidization.

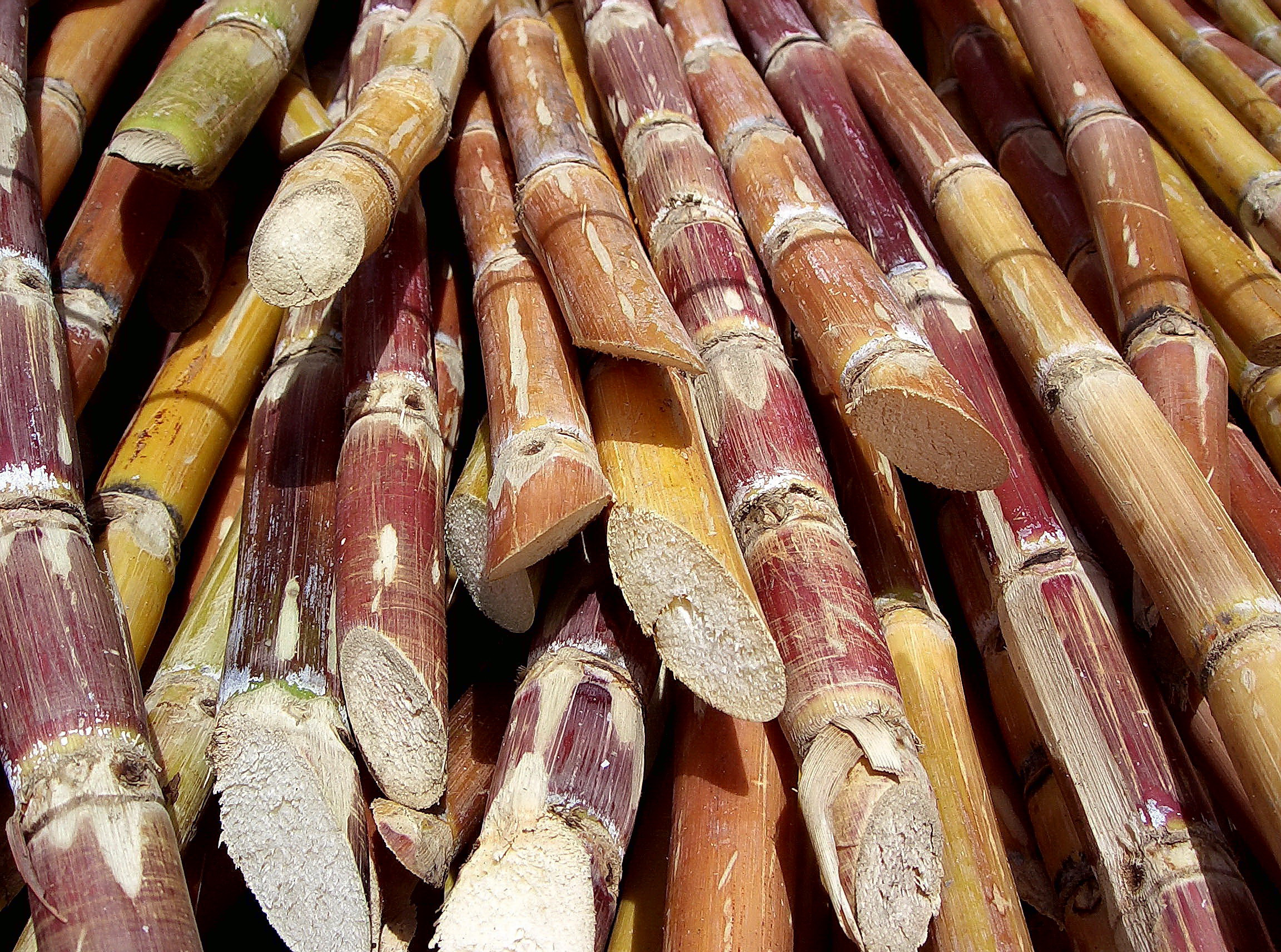
Cut sugarcane

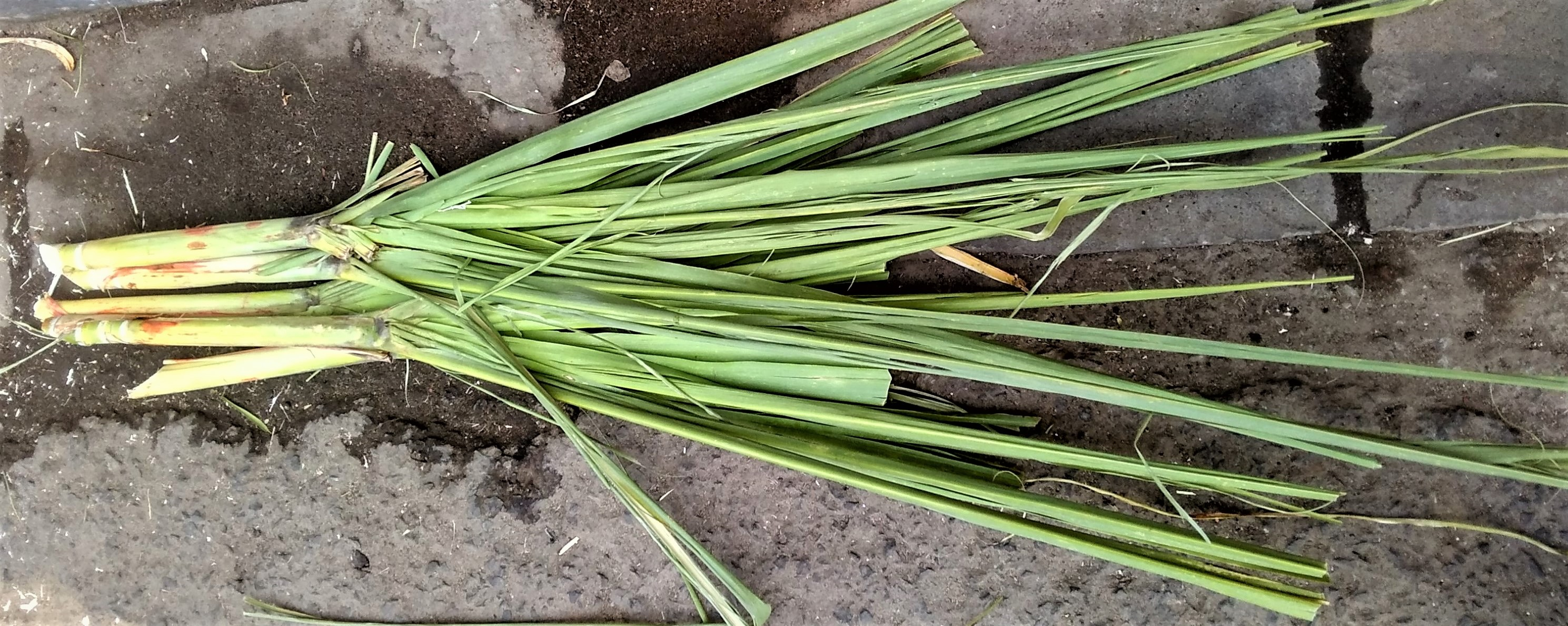
Sugarcane canopy

== History ==
The two centers of domestication for sugarcane are one for Saccharum officinarum by Papuans in New Guinea and another for Saccharum sinense by Austronesians in Taiwan and southern China. Papuans and Austronesians originally primarily used sugarcane as food for domesticated pigs. The spread of both S. officinarum and S. sinense is closely linked to the migrations of the Austronesian peoples. Saccharum barberi was cultivated in India only after the introduction of S. officinarum.

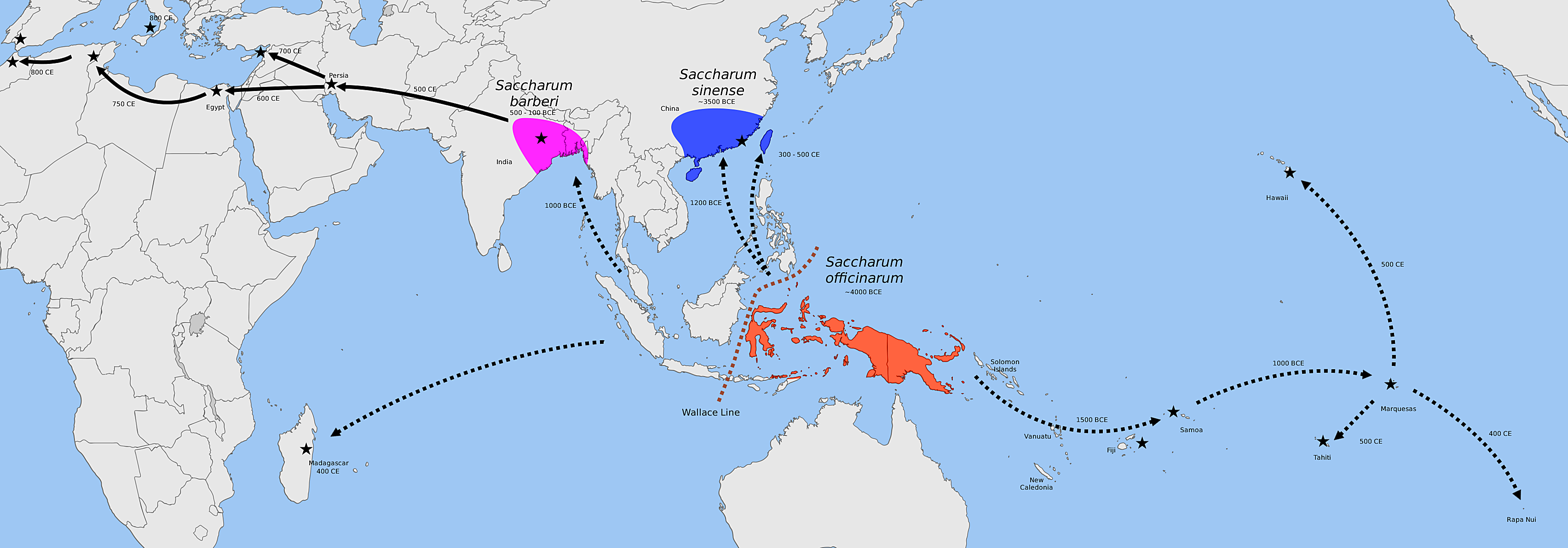
Map showing centers of origin of Saccharum officinarum in New Guinea, S. sinensis in southern China and Taiwan, and S. barberi in India; dotted arrows represent Austronesian introductions

S. officinarum was first domesticated in New Guinea and the islands east of the Wallace Line by Papuans, where it is the modern center of diversity. Beginning around 6,000 BP, several strains were selectively bred from the native Saccharum robustum. From New Guinea, it spread westwards to Maritime Southeast Asia after contact with Austronesians, where it hybridized with Saccharum spontaneum.

The second domestication center is southern China and Taiwan, where S. sinense was a primary cultigen of the Austronesian peoples. Words for sugarcane are reconstructed as *təbuS or *CebuS in Proto-Austronesian, which became *tebuh in Proto-Malayo-Polynesian. It was one of the original major crops of the Austronesian peoples from at least 5,500 BP. Introduction of the sweeter S. officinarum may have gradually replaced it throughout its cultivated range in maritime Southeast Asia.

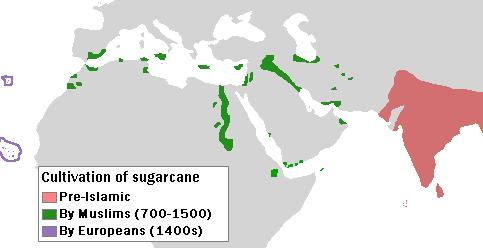
The westward diffusion of sugarcane in pre-Islamic times (shown in red), in the medieval Muslim world (green), and in the 15th century by the Portuguese on the Madeira archipelago, and by the Spanish on the Canary Islands archipelago (islands west of Africa, circled by violet lines)

From Insular Southeast Asia, S. officinarum was spread eastward into Polynesia and Micronesia by Austronesian voyagers as a canoe plant by around 3,500 BP. It was also spread westward and northward by around 3,000 BP to China and India by Austronesian traders, where it further hybridized with S. sinense and S. barberi. From there, it spread further into western Eurasia and the Mediterranean.

The earliest known production of crystalline sugar began in northern India. The earliest evidence of sugar production comes from ancient Sanskrit and Pali texts. Around the eighth century, Muslim and Arab traders introduced sugar from medieval India to the other parts of the Abbasid Caliphate in the Mediterranean, Mesopotamia, Egypt, North Africa, and Andalusia. By the 10th century, sources state that every village in Mesopotamia grew sugarcane. It was among the early crops brought to the Americas by the Spanish, mainly Andalusians, from their fields in the Canary Islands, and the Portuguese from their fields in the Madeira Islands. An article on sugarcane cultivation in Spain is included in Ibn al-'Awwam's 12th-century Book on Agriculture.

The first chemically refined sugar appeared on the scene in India about 2,500 years ago. From there, the technique spread east towards China, and west towards Persia and the early Islamic worlds, eventually reaching the Mediterranean in the 13th century. Cyprus and Sicily became important centers for sugar production.

In colonial times, sugar formed one side of the triangle trade of New World raw materials, along with European manufactured goods and African slaves. It was during Christopher Columbus's second voyage to the Americas that he first brought sugarcane to the Caribbean (and the New World), initially to the island of Hispaniola (modern-day Haiti and the Dominican Republic). The first sugar harvest happened in Hispaniola in 1501; many sugar mills were constructed in Cuba and Jamaica by the 1520s. The Portuguese introduced sugarcane to Brazil. By 1540, there were 800 cane sugar mills in Santa Catarina Island and another 2,000 on the north coast of Brazil, Demarara, and Suriname.

Sugar, often in the form of molasses, was shipped from the Caribbean to Europe or New England, where it was used to make rum. The profits from the sale of sugar were then used to purchase manufactured goods, which were then shipped to West Africa, where they were bartered for slaves. The slaves were then brought back to the Caribbean to be sold to sugar planters. The profits from the sale of the slaves were then used to buy more sugar, which was shipped to Europe. Toil in the sugar plantations became a main basis for the Atlantic slave trade, supplying people to work under brutal coercion.

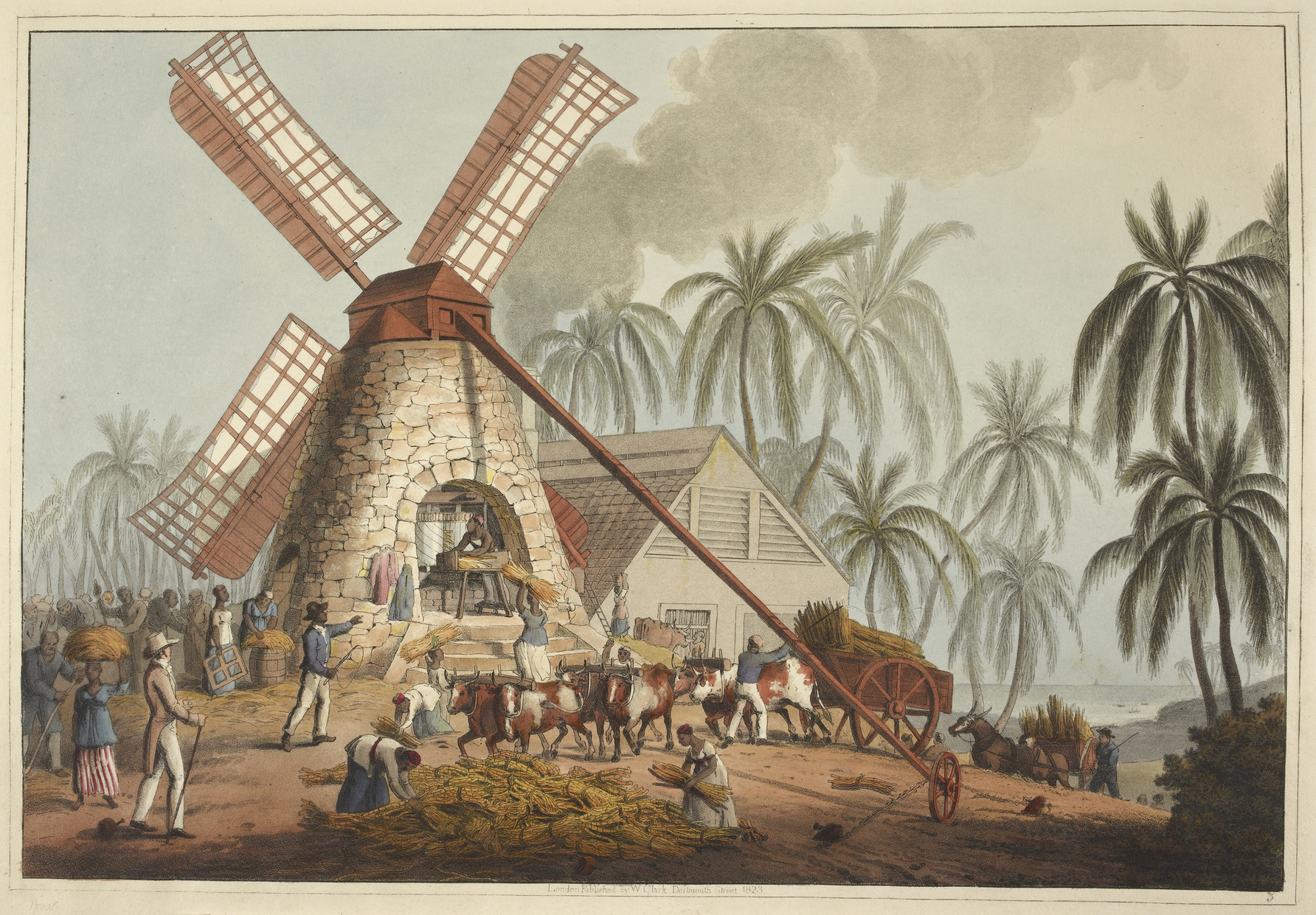
Lithograph of sugarcane being ground using a windmill on a sugar plantation in the British colony of Antigua, 1823

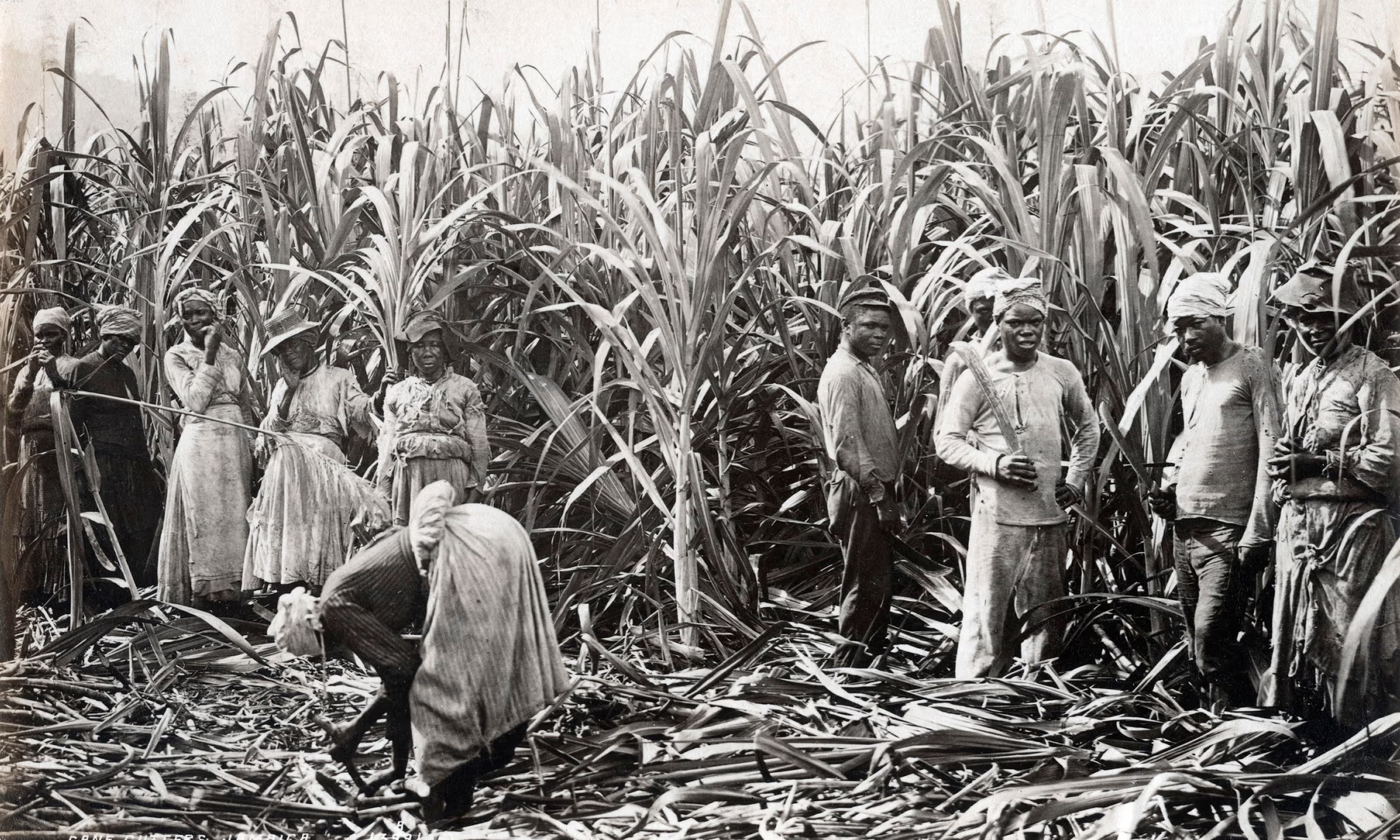
A sugar plantation on the island of Jamaica in the late 19th century

The passage of the 1833 Slavery Abolition Act led to the end of slavery through most of the British Empire, and many of the emancipated slaves no longer worked on sugarcane plantations when they had a choice. West Indian planters, therefore, needed new workers, and they found cheap labour in China and India. The workers were subject to indenture, a long-established form of contract, which bound them to unfree labour for a fixed term. The conditions where the indentured servants worked were frequently abysmal, owing to a lack of care among the planters. The first ships carrying indentured labourers from India left in 1836. The migrations to serve sugarcane plantations led to a significant number of ethnic Indians, Southeast Asians, and Chinese people settling in various parts of the world. In some islands and countries, the South Asian migrants now constitute between 10 and 50% of the population. Sugarcane plantations and Asian ethnic groups continue to thrive in countries such as Fiji, South Africa, Myanmar, Sri Lanka, Malaysia, Indonesia, the Philippines, Guyana, Jamaica, Trinidad, Martinique, French Guiana, Guadeloupe, Grenada, St. Lucia, St. Vincent, St. Kitts, St. Croix, Suriname, Nevis, and Mauritius.

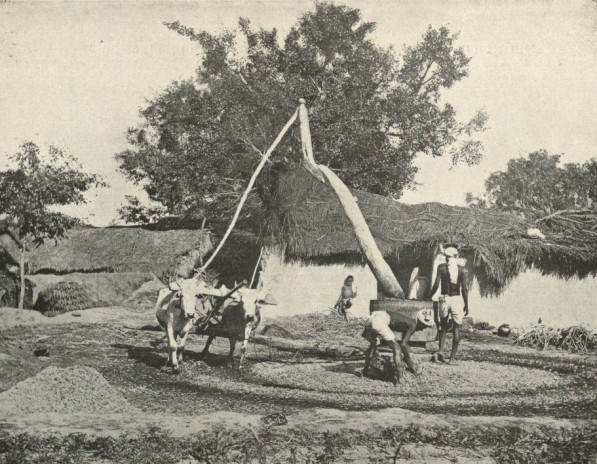
Indian sugarcane press, circa 1905

In the United States, sugarcane was grown by enslaved Black laborers and, after the Civil War, Chinese migrant workers on Louisiana's sugar plantations, which were started by plantation owners who escaped Saint-Domingue after the Haitian Revolution and the Louisiana Purchase. The first commercial sugarcane crop was produced in Louisiana in 1795 by the French Creole planter Étienne de Boré and Saint-Domingue chemist Antoine Morin. Plantation owners like the Heydels, who owned Whitney Plantation, converted their land from indigo and rice to sugar after 1795 as well. As the US's largest slave market was located in New Orleans, sugar producers used enslaved Black labor to make Louisiana the producer of almost 25% of the world's exportable sugar by 1853. Just before the Civil War, Louisiana's sugar industry was worth more than $200 million, with "more than half of that figure represent[ing] the valuation of the ownership of human beings." Enslaved laborers resisted the conditions on sugarcane plantations. During the 1811 German Coast uprising, as many as 500 enslaved workers burned sugar plantations as they marched to New Orleans. During the CivIl War, W.E.B. DuBois wrote in his Black Reconstruction, Black cane workers abandoned cane plantations and the industry essentially collapsed. Following the war, Louisiana planters engaged Chinese workers in exploitative multi-year labor contracts; these laborers lived in segregated quarters and earned 30% less than local Black laborers.

Between 1863 and 1900, merchants and plantation owners in Queensland and New South Wales (now part of the Commonwealth of Australia) brought between 55,000 and 62,500 people from the South Pacific islands to work on sugarcane plantations. An estimated one-third of these workers were coerced or kidnapped into slavery (known as blackbirding); many others were paid very low wages. Between 1904 and 1908, most of the 10,000 remaining workers were deported in an effort to keep Australia racially homogeneous and protect white workers from cheap foreign labour.

Cuban sugar derived from sugarcane was exported to the USSR, where it received price supports and was ensured a guaranteed market. The 1991 dissolution of the Soviet state forced the closure of most of Cuba's sugar industry.

Sugarcane remains an important part of the economy of Cuba, Guyana, Belize, Barbados, and Haiti, along with the Dominican Republic, Guadeloupe, Jamaica, and other islands.

About 70% of the sugar produced globally comes from S. officinarum and hybrids using this species.

Sugar occupies 26,942,686 hectares of land across the globe and is the third most valuable crop.

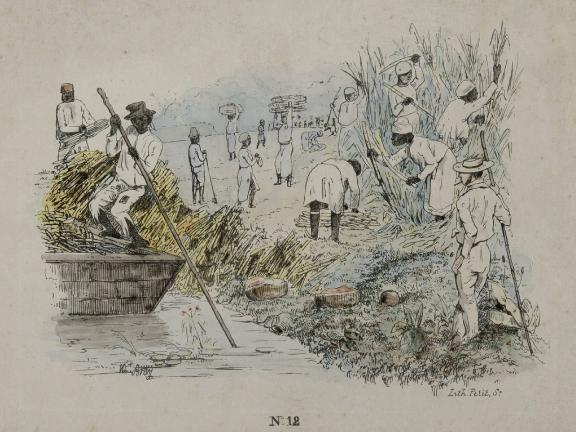
A 19th-century lithograph by Theodore Bray showing a sugarcane plantation: On the right is the "white officer", the European overseer. Slave workers toil during the harvest. To the left is a flat-bottomed vessel for cane transportation

== Cultivation ==
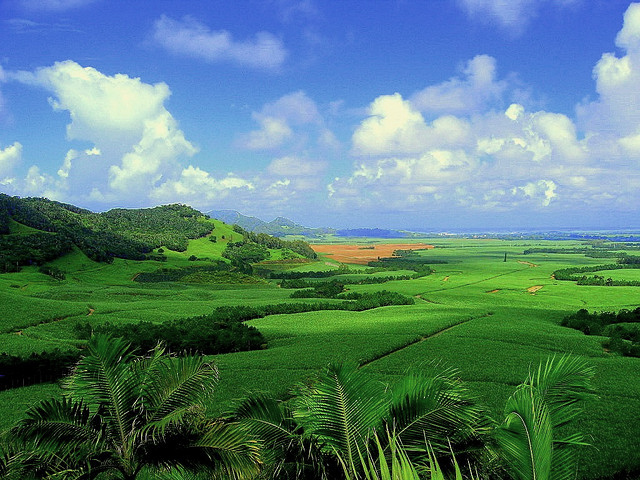
Sugarcane plantation, Mauritius

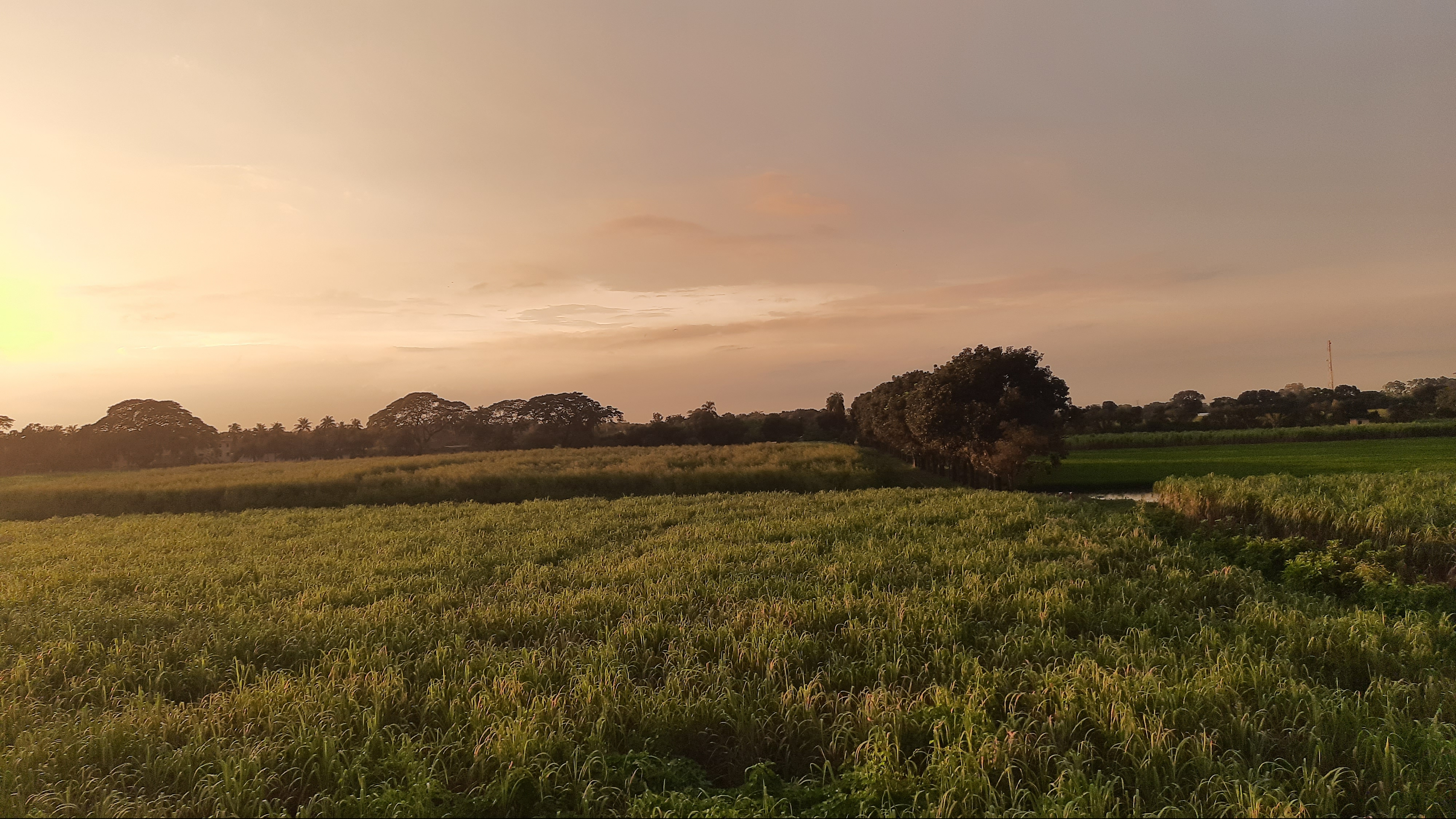
Sugarcane plantation in Bangladesh

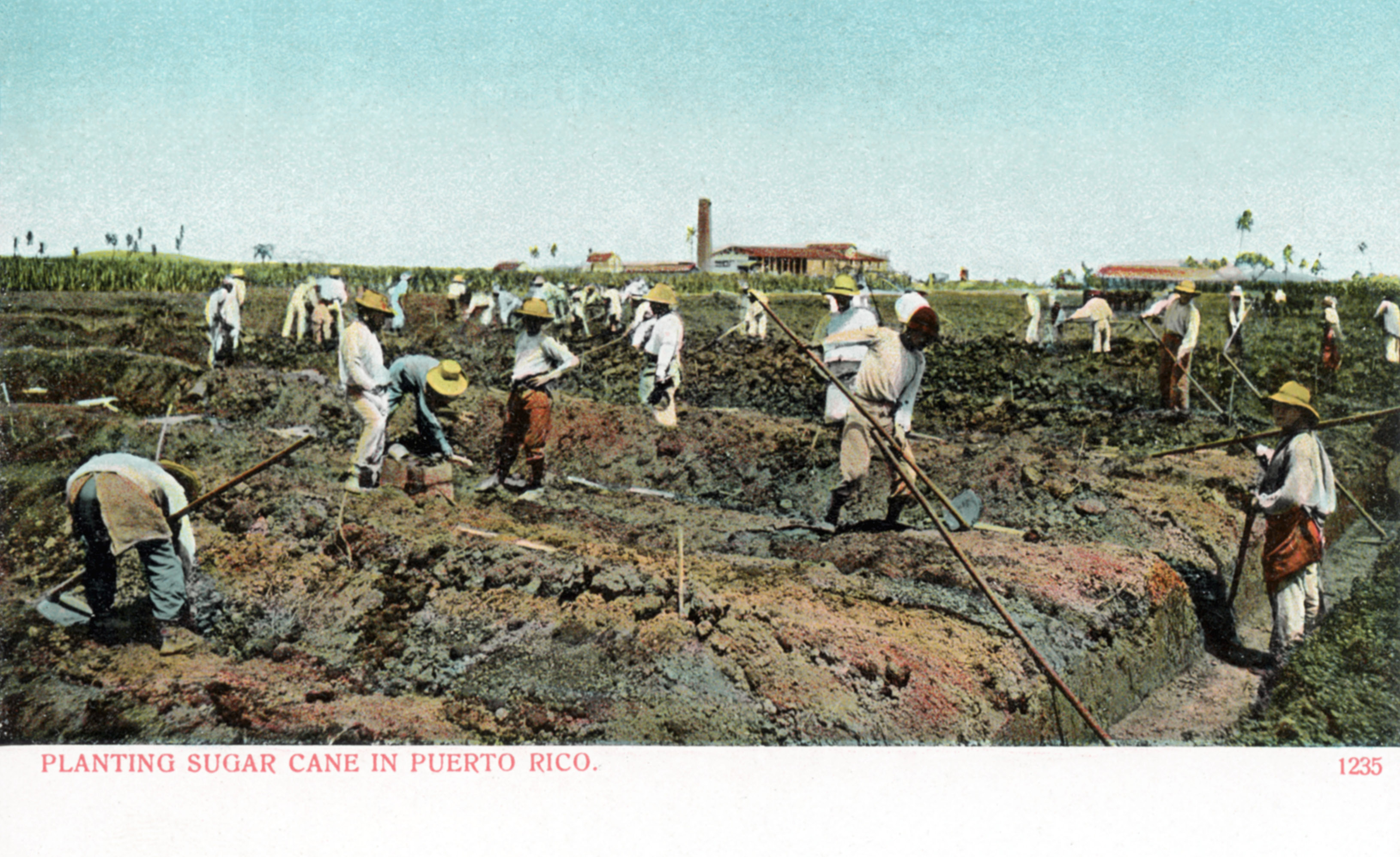
Planting sugarcane in Puerto Rico

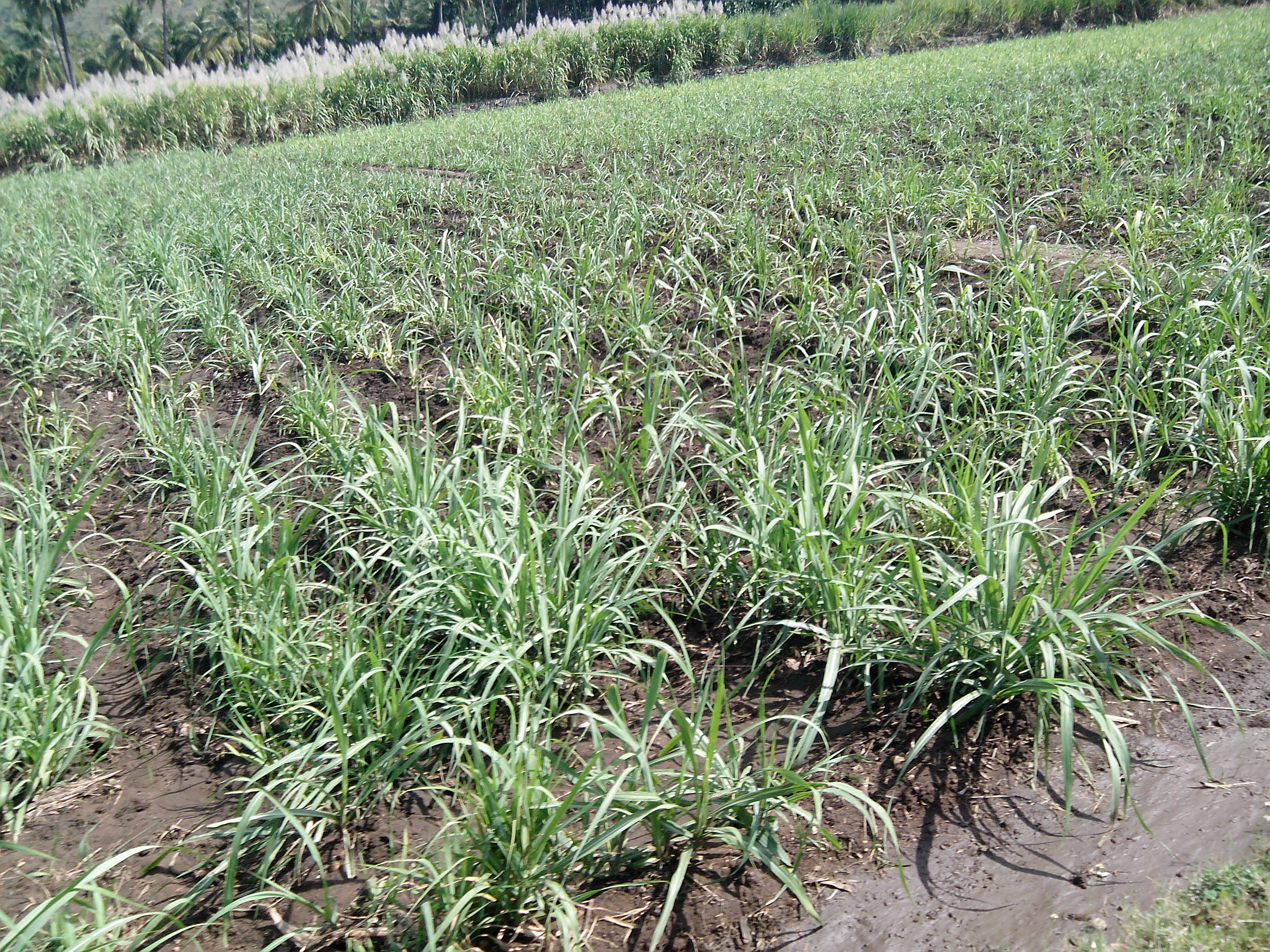
Sugarcane fields

Production of sugar cane, 2023.

Sugarcane cultivation requires a tropical or subtropical climate, with a minimum of 60 cm (24 in) of annual moisture. It is one of the most efficient photosynthesizers in the plant kingdom. It is a C_{4} plant, able to convert up to 1% of incident solar energy into biomass. In primary growing regions across the tropics and subtropics, sugarcane crops can produce over 15 kg/m^{2} of cane.

Sugarcane accounted for around 21% of global crop production over the 2000–2021 period. The Americas was the leading region in the production of sugarcane (52% of the world total).

Once a major crop of the southeastern region of the United States, sugarcane cultivation declined there during the late 20th century, and in the 21st century is primarily confined to small plantations in Florida, Louisiana, and southeast Texas. Sugarcane cultivation ceased in Hawaii when the last operating sugar plantation in the state shut down in 2016.

Sugarcane is cultivated in the tropics and subtropics in areas with a plentiful supply of water for a continuous period of more than 6–7 months each year, either from natural rainfall or through irrigation. The crop does not tolerate severe frosts. Therefore, most of the world's sugarcane is grown between 22°N and 22°S, and some up to 33°N and 33°S. When sugarcane crops are found outside this range, such as the KwaZulu-Natal region of South Africa, it is normally due to anomalous climatic conditions in the region, such as warm ocean currents that sweep down the coast. In terms of altitude, sugarcane crops are found up to 1,600 m or 5,200 ft close to the equator in countries such as Colombia, Ecuador, and Peru.

Sugarcane can be grown on many soils ranging from highly fertile, well-drained mollisols, through heavy cracking vertisols, infertile acid oxisols and ultisols, peaty histosols, to rocky andisols. Both plentiful sunshine and water supplies increase cane production. This has made desert countries with good irrigation facilities such as Egypt some of the highest-yielding sugarcane-cultivating regions. Sugarcane consumes 9% of the world's potash fertilizer production.

Although some sugarcanes produce seeds, modern stem cutting has become the most common reproduction method. Each cutting must contain at least one bud, and the cuttings are sometimes hand-planted. In more technologically advanced countries, such as the United States and Australia, billet planting is common. Billets (stalks or stalk sections) harvested by a mechanical harvester are planted by a machine that opens and recloses the ground. Once planted, a stand can be harvested several times; after each harvest, the cane sends up new stalks, called ratoons. Successive harvests give decreasing yields, eventually justifying replanting. Two to 10 harvests are usually made, depending on the type of culture. In a country with mechanical agriculture looking for high production of large fields, as in North America, sugarcanes are replanted after two or three harvests to avoid lowering yields. In countries with a more traditional type of agriculture with smaller fields and hand harvesting, as in the French island of Réunion, sugarcane is often harvested up to 10 years before replanting.

Sugarcane is harvested by hand and mechanically. Hand harvesting accounts for more than half of production, and is dominant in the developing world. In hand harvesting, the field is first set on fire. The fire burns up dry leaves, and chases away or kills venomous snakes, without harming the stalks and roots. Harvesters then cut the cane just above ground level using cane knives or machetes. A skilled harvester can cut 500 kg (1,100 lb) of sugarcane per hour.

Mechanical harvesting uses a combine, or sugarcane harvester. The Austoft 7000 series, the original modern harvester design, has now been copied by other companies, including Cameco / John Deere. The machine cuts the cane at the base of the stalk, strips the leaves, chops the cane into consistent lengths, and deposits it into a transporter following alongside. The harvester then blows the trash back onto the field. Such machines can harvest 100 long tons (100 t) each hour, but harvested cane must be rapidly processed. Once cut, sugarcane begins to lose its sugar content, and damage to the cane during mechanical harvesting accelerates this decline. This decline is offset because a modern chopper harvester can complete the harvest faster and more efficiently than hand cutting and loading. Austoft also developed a series of hydraulic high-lift infield transporters to work alongside its harvesters to allow even more rapid transfer of cane to, for example, the nearest railway siding. This mechanical harvesting does not require the field to be set on fire; the residue left in the field by the machine consists of cane tops and dead leaves, which serve as mulch for the next planting.

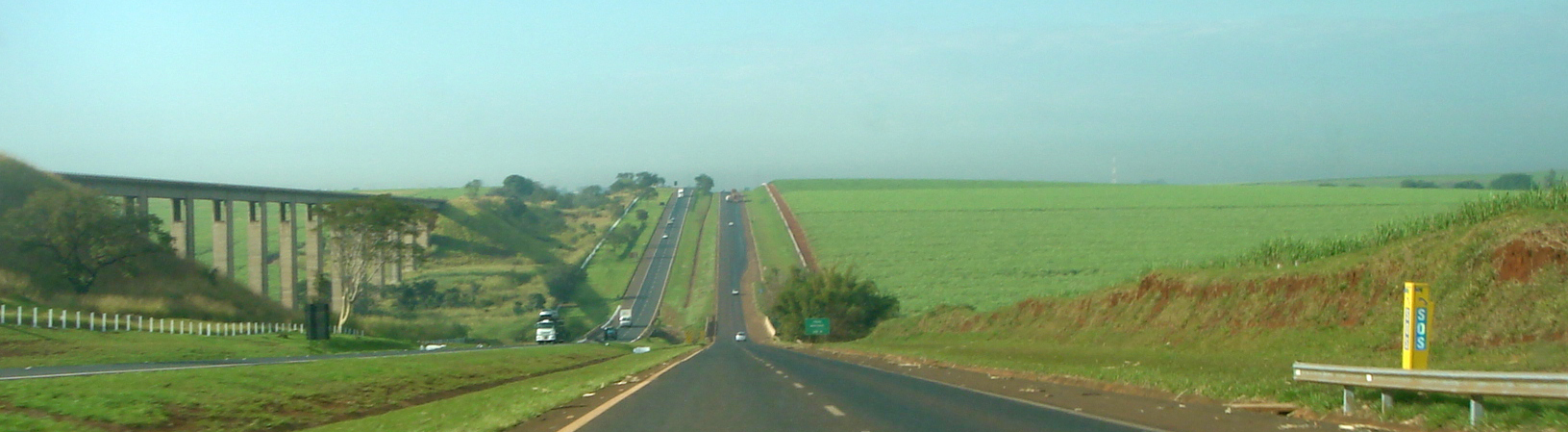
Plantations in Brazil, the largest producer in the world

=== Pests ===
The cane beetle (also known as cane grub) can substantially reduce crop yield by eating roots; it can be controlled with imidacloprid (Confidor) or chlorpyrifos (Lorsban). Other important pests are the larvae of some butterfly/moth species, including the turnip moth, the sugarcane borer (Diatraea saccharalis), the African sugarcane borer (Eldana saccharina), the Mexican rice borer (Eoreuma loftini), the African armyworm (Spodoptera exempta), leafcutter ants, termites, spittlebugs (especially Mahanarva fimbriolata and Deois flavopicta), and Migdolus fryanus (a beetle). The planthopper insect Eumetopina flavipes acts as a virus vector, which causes the sugarcane disease ramu stunt. Sesamia grisescens is a major pest in Papua New Guinea and so is a serious concern for the Australian industry were it to cross over. To head off such a problem, the Federal Government has pre-announced that they would cover 80% of response costs if it were necessary.

=== Pathogens ===
Numerous pathogens infect sugarcane, such as sugarcane grassy shoot disease caused by Candidatus Phytoplasma sacchari, whiptail disease or sugarcane smut, pokkah boeng caused by Fusarium moniliforme, Xanthomonas axonopodis bacteria causes Gumming Disease, and red rot disease caused by Colletotrichum falcatum. Viral diseases affecting sugarcane include sugarcane mosaic virus, maize streak virus, and sugarcane yellow leaf virus.

Yang et al., 2017 provides a genetic map developed for USDA ARS-run breeding programs for brown rust of sugarcane.

=== Nitrogen fixation ===
Some sugarcane varieties are capable of fixing atmospheric nitrogen in association with the bacterium Gluconacetobacter diazotrophicus. Unlike legumes and other nitrogen-fixing plants that form root nodules in the soil in association with bacteria, G. diazotrophicus lives within the intercellular spaces of the sugarcane's stem. Coating seeds with the bacteria was assayed in 2006 with the intention of enabling crop species to fix nitrogen for their own use.

=== Conditions for sugarcane workers ===
At least 20,000 people are estimated to have died of chronic kidney disease in Central America in the past two decades, most of them sugarcane workers along the Pacific coast. This condition is termed Mesoamerican nephropathy. This may be due to working long hours in the heat without adequate fluid intake. Additionally, some of the workers are being exposed to hazards such as high temperatures, harmful pesticides, and venomous animals. This occurs during the process of cutting the sugarcane manually, causing physical ailments due to constant repetitive movements for hours every work day.

In India, especially in Maharashtra, sugarcane production is linked to forced labour, as a result of an exploitative advance payment system for workers that puts them deeply in debt and requires them to return year after year, earning less than $5 a day. Working conditions are generally very poor, with workers migrating during the harvest season and living in makeshift tents in the fields they harvest, with no toilets, electricity, or running water. Child labour is common, and child marriage between sugar harvesters is frequent, despite both being illegal. Indian sugarcane production is also linked to an unusually high rate of hysterectomies (some 1 in 5 sugarcane harvesting women), which women are pressured to receive by sugarcane producers, and the lack of sanitary facilities, family planning options, or medical leave. India is the world's second-largest sugar producer, and Maharashtra produces one-third of the country's sugar, which then enters the global supply chain—making its provenance hard to track. The Coca-Cola Company and PepsiCo have bought significant amounts of sugar from Maharashtra since at least the 2010s, mostly for use in Indian soft drinks, but deny that they are complicit in labor abuses.

== Processing ==
Non-centrifugal cane sugar (jaggery) production near Inle Lake (Myanmar), crushing and boiling stage

Traditionally, sugarcane processing requires two stages. Mills extract raw sugar from freshly harvested cane and "mill-white" sugar is sometimes produced immediately after the first stage at sugar-extraction mills, intended for local consumption. Sugar crystals appear naturally white in color during the crystallization process. Sulfur dioxide is added to inhibit the formation of color-inducing molecules and to stabilize the sugar juices during evaporation. Refineries, often located nearer to consumers in North America, Europe, and Japan, then produce refined white sugar, which is 99% sucrose. These two stages are slowly merging. Increasing affluence in the sugarcane-producing tropics increases demand for refined sugar products, driving a trend toward combined milling and refining.

=== Milling ===
Sugarcane processing produces cane sugar (sucrose) from sugarcane. Other products of the processing include bagasse, molasses, and filter cake.

Bagasse, the residual dry fiber of the cane after cane juice has been extracted, is used for several purposes:

- fuel for the boilers and kilns
- production of paper, paperboard products, and reconstituted panelboard
- agricultural mulch
- as a raw material for production of chemicals

The primary use of bagasse and bagasse residue is as a fuel source for boilers in the generation of process steam in sugar plants. Dried filter cake is used as an animal feed supplement, fertilizer, and source of sugarcane wax.

Molasses is produced in two forms: blackstrap, which has a characteristic strong flavor, and a purer molasses syrup. Blackstrap molasses is sold as a food and dietary supplement. It is also a common ingredient in animal feed, and is used to produce ethanol, rum, and citric acid. Purer molasses syrups are sold as molasses, and may also be blended with maple syrup, invert sugars, or corn syrup. Both forms of molasses are used in baking.

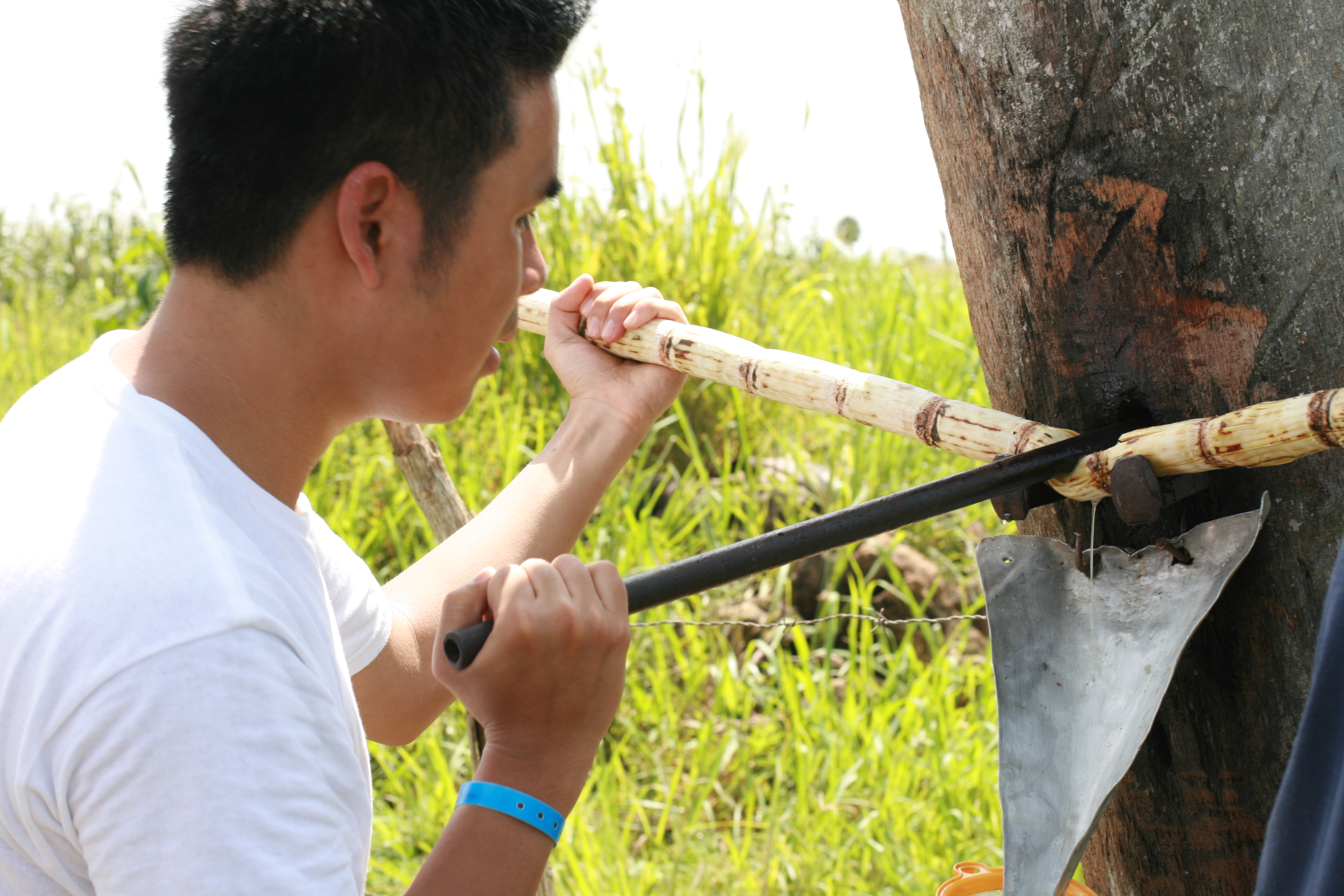
Manually extracting juice from sugarcane

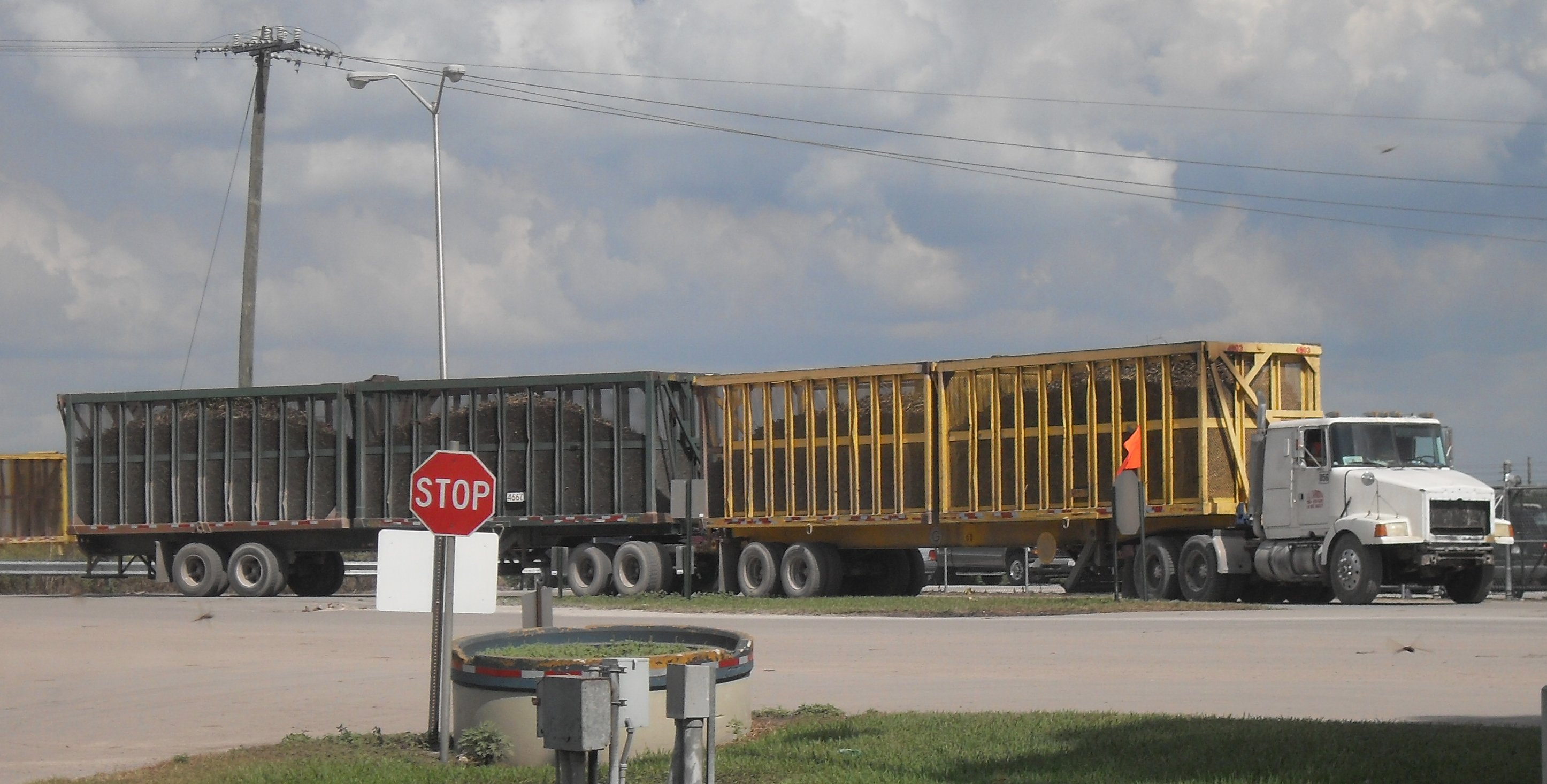
A truck hauls cane to a sugar mill in Florida.

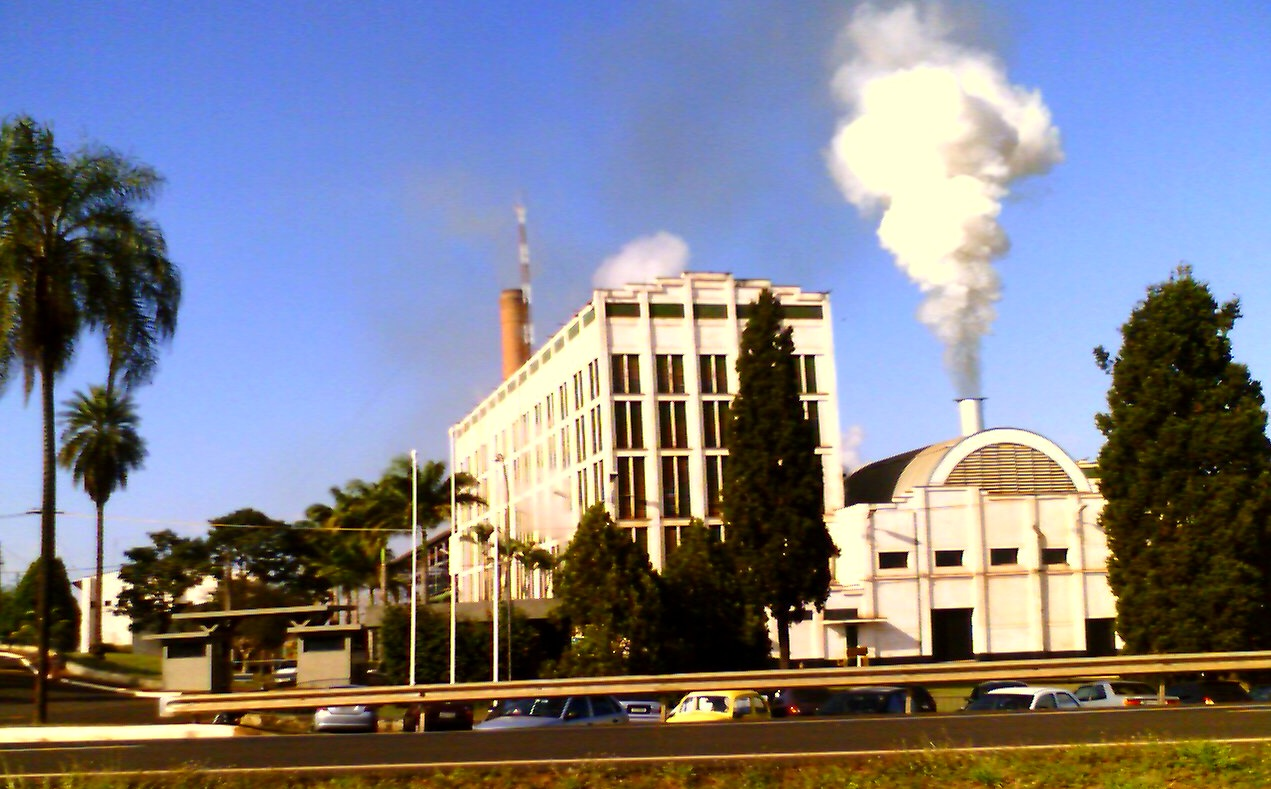
Santa Elisa sugarcane processing plant in Sertãozinho, one of the largest and oldest in Brazil

=== Refining ===
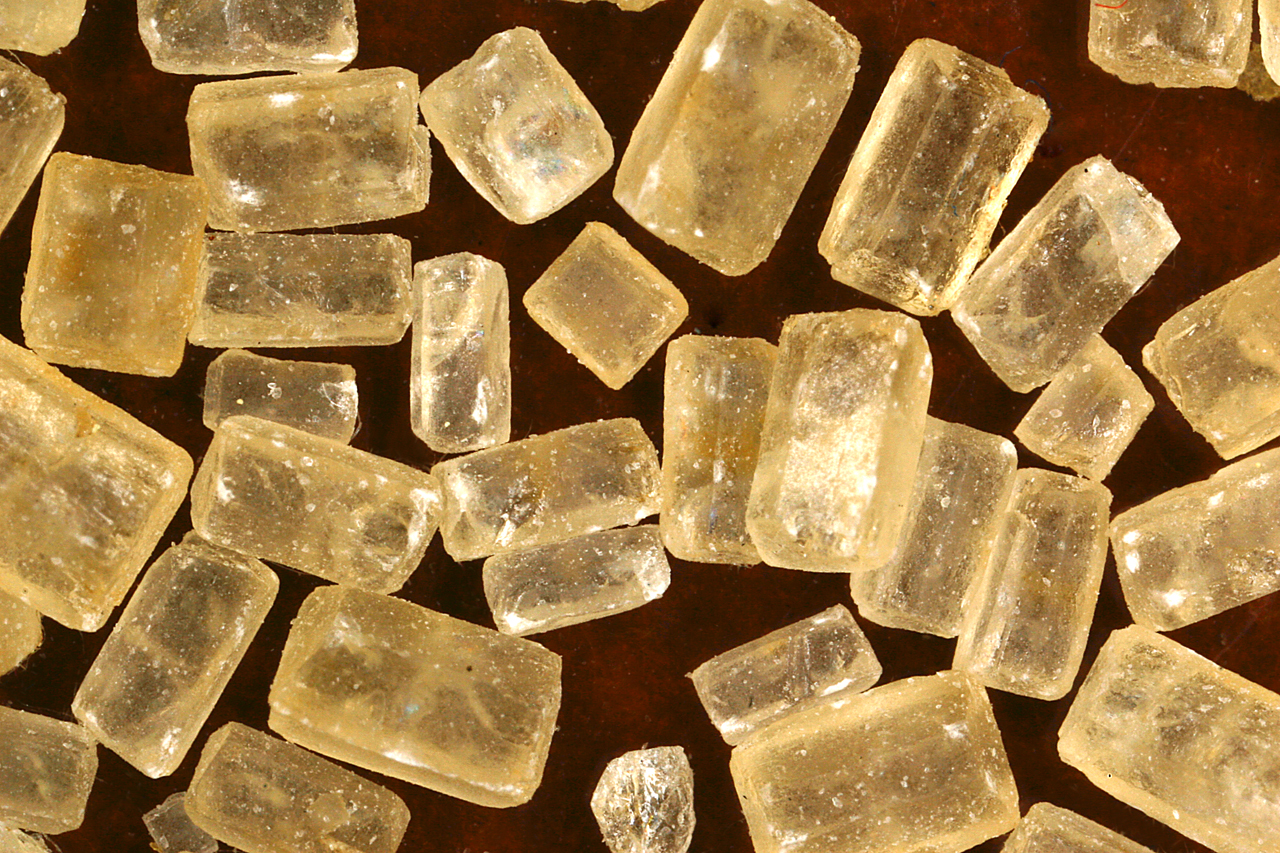
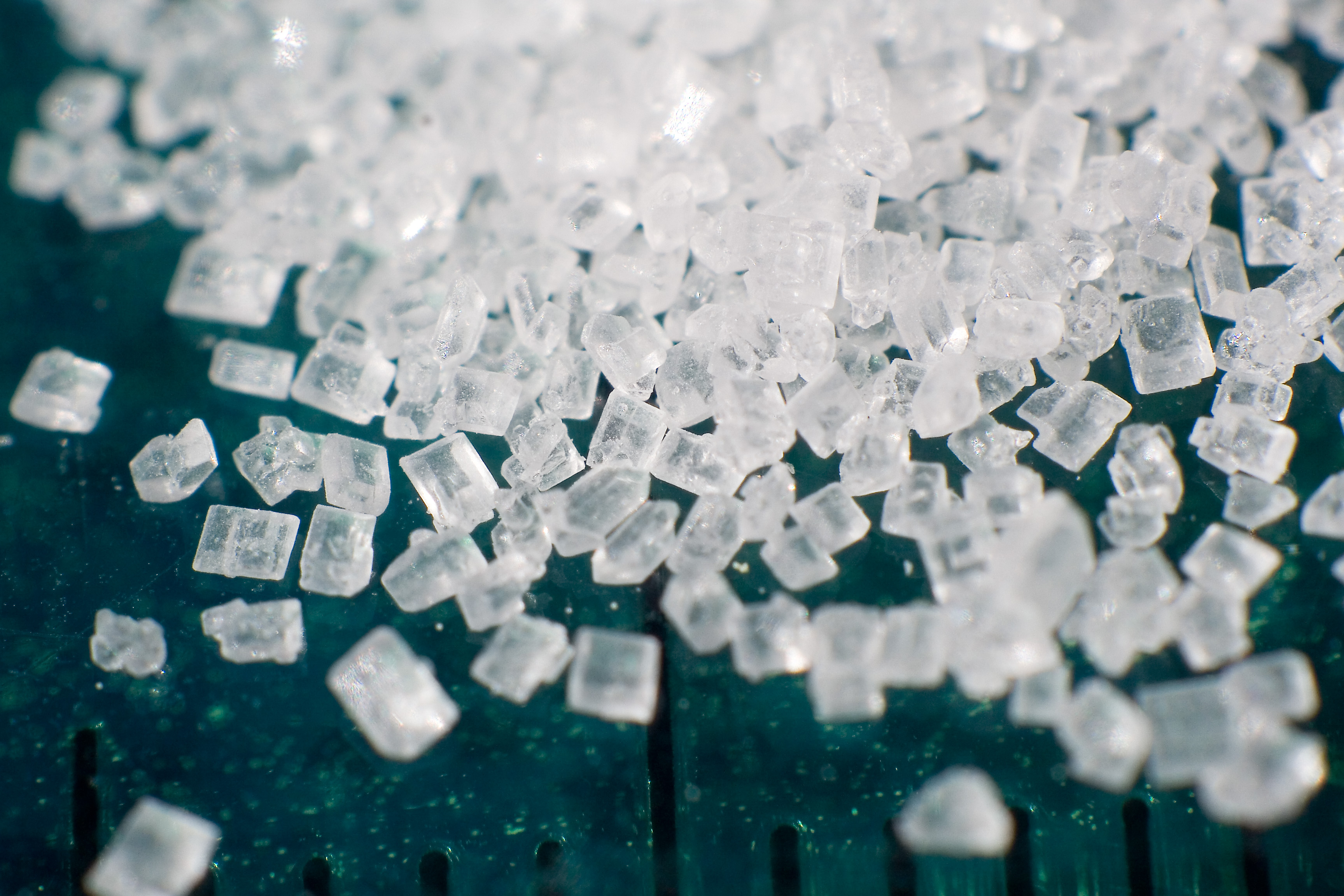
Brown and white sugar crystals

Sugar refining further purifies the raw sugar. It is first mixed with heavy syrup and then centrifuged in a process called "affination". Its purpose is to wash away the sugar crystals' outer coating, which is less pure than the crystal interior. The remaining sugar is then dissolved to make a syrup, about 60% solids by weight.

The sugar solution is clarified by the addition of phosphoric acid and calcium hydroxide, which combine to precipitate calcium phosphate. The calcium phosphate particles entrap some impurities and absorb others, then float to the top of the tank where they can be skimmed off. An alternative to this "phosphatation" technique is "carbonatation", which is similar, but uses carbon dioxide and calcium hydroxide to produce a calcium carbonate precipitate.

After filtering any remaining solids, the clarified syrup is decolorized by filtration through activated carbon. Bone char or coal-based activated carbon is traditionally used in this role. Some remaining color-forming impurities are adsorbed by the carbon. The purified syrup is then concentrated to supersaturation and repeatedly crystallized in a vacuum, to produce white refined sugar. As in a sugar mill, the sugar crystals are separated from the molasses by centrifuging. Additional sugar is recovered by blending the remaining syrup with the washings from affination and again crystallizing to produce brown sugar. When no more sugar can be economically recovered, the final molasses still contains 30–35% sucrose and 10–25% glucose and fructose.

To produce granulated sugar, in which individual grains do not clump, sugar must be dried, first by heating in a rotary dryer, and then by blowing cool air through it for several days.

=== Ribbon cane syrup ===
Ribbon cane is a subtropical type that was once widely grown in the Southern United States, as far north as coastal North Carolina. The juice was extracted with horse- or mule-powered crushers; the juice was boiled, like maple syrup, in a flat pan, and then used in the syrup form as a food sweetener. It is not currently a commercial crop, but a few growers find ready sales for their product.

== Production ==
Top sugarcane producers
- in 2022

Numbers in million tonnes
- 1. Brazil: 724.4 (37.69%)
- 2. India: 439.4 (22.86%)
- 3. China: 103.4 (5.38%)
- 4. Thailand: 92.1 (4.79%)
- 5. Pakistan: 88 (4.58%)
- 6. Mexico: 55.3 (2.88%)
- 7. Colombia: 35 (1.82%)
- 8. Indonesia: 32.4 (1.69%)
- 9. United States: 31.5 (1.64%)
- 10. Australia: 28.7 (1.49%)
- World total: 1,922.1

In 2022, global production of sugarcane was 1.92 billion tonnes, with Brazil producing 38% of the world total, India with 23%, and China producing 5% (table).

Worldwide, 26 million hectares were devoted to sugarcane cultivation in 2020. The average worldwide yield of sugarcane crops in 2022 was 74 tonnes per hectare, led by Peru with 121 tonnes per hectare. The theoretical possible yield for sugarcane is about 280 tonnes per hectare per year, and small experimental plots in Brazil have demonstrated yields of 236–280 tonnes of cane per hectare.

From 2008 to 2016, production of standards-compliant sugarcane experienced a compound annual growth rate of about 52%, while conventional sugarcane increased at less than 1%.

Sugar cane production

Sugar cane yields

== Environmental consequences ==
=== Soil degradation and erosion ===
The cultivation of sugarcane can lead to increased soil loss through the removal of soil at harvest, as well as improper irrigation practices, which can result in erosion. Erosion is especially significant when the sugarcane is grown on slopes or hillsides, which increases the rate of water runoff. Generally, it is recommended that sugarcane is not planted in areas with a slope greater than 8%. However, in certain areas, such as parts of the Caribbean and South Africa, slopes greater than 20% have been planted. Increased erosion can lead to the removal of organic and nutrient-rich material, which can decrease future crop yields. It can also result in sediments and other pollutants being washed into aquatic habitats, which can result in a wide range of environmental issues, including eutrophication and acidification.

Sugarcane cultivation can also result in soil compaction, which is caused by the use of heavy, infield machinery. Along with affecting invertebrate and fauna within the upper layers of the soil, compaction can also lead to decreased porosity. This in turn can increase surface runoff, resulting in greater leaching and erosion.

=== Habitat destruction ===
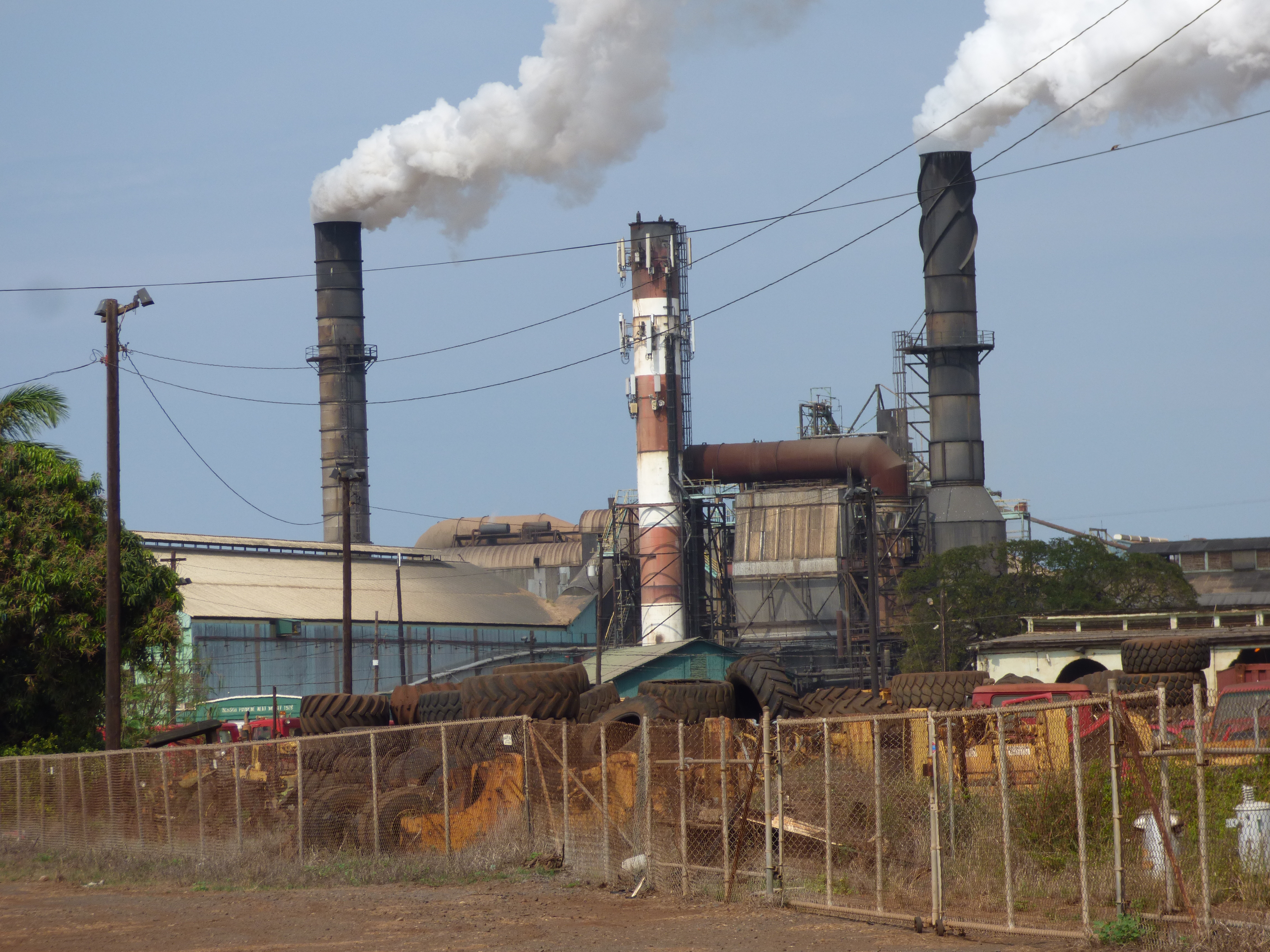
Steam produced from sugarcane processing.

Due to the large quantity of water required, sugarcane cultivation heavily relies on irrigation. Additionally, since large amounts of soil are removed with the crop during harvest, significant washing occurs during the processing phase. In many countries, such as India and Australia, this requirement has placed a strain on available resources, requiring the construction of barrages and other dams. This has altered the amount of water reaching aquatic habitats, and has contributed to the degradation of ecosystems such as the Great Barrier Reef and Indus Delta.

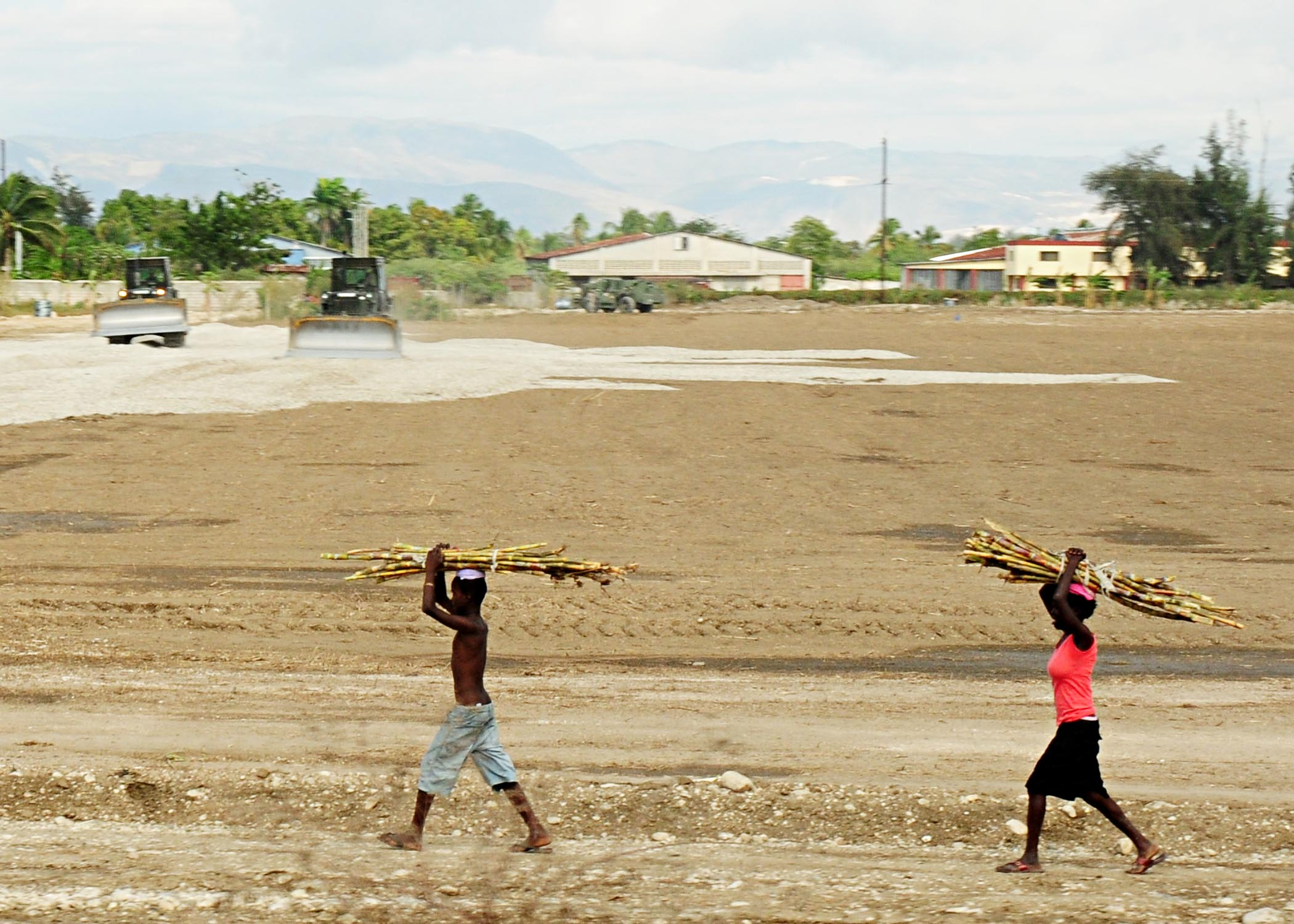
Land cleared for sugarcane production.

Sugarcane has also contributed to habitat destruction through the clearance of land. Seven countries around the world devote more than 50% of their land to the cultivation of sugarcane. Sugarcane fields have replaced tropical rain forests and wetlands. While the majority of this clearance occurred in the past, expansions have occurred within the past couple decades, further contributing to habitat destruction.

=== Mitigation efforts ===
A wide variety of mitigation efforts can be implemented to reduce the consequences of sugarcane cultivation. Among these efforts is switching to alternative irrigation techniques, such as drip irrigation, which are more water efficient. Water efficiency can also be improved by employing methods such as trash mulching, which has been shown to increase water intake and storage. Along with reducing the overall water use, this method can also decrease soil runoff, and therefore prevent pollutants from entering the environment. In areas with a slope greater than 11%, it is also recommended that zero tillage or cane strip planting are implemented to help prevent soil loss.

Sugarcane processing produces a wide variety of pollutants, including heavy metals and bagasse, which can be released into the environment through wastewater discharge. To prevent this, alternative treatment methods such as high rate anaerobic digestions can be implemented to better treat this wastewater. Stormwater drains can also be installed to prevent uncontrolled runoff from reaching aquatic ecosystems.

== Ethanol ==
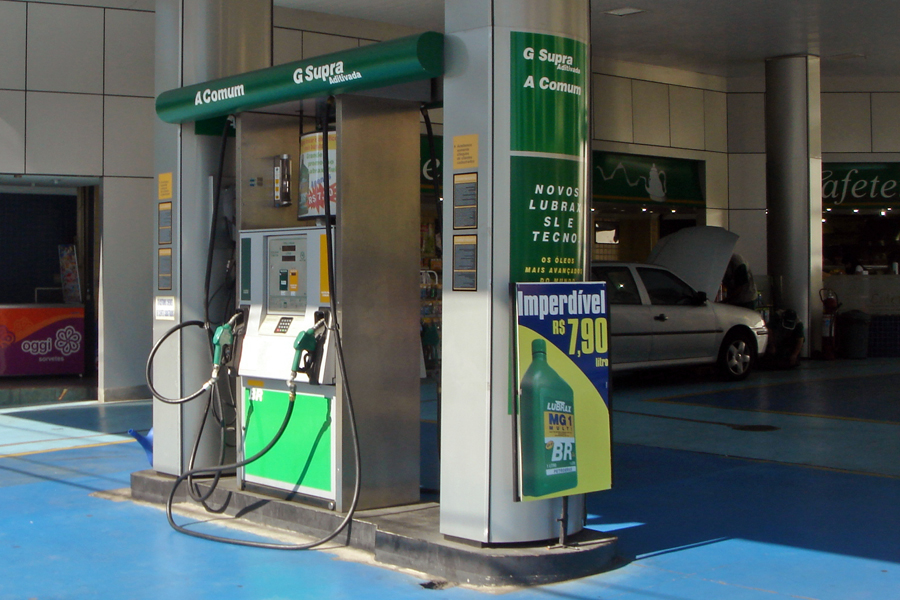
A fuel pump in Brazil, offering cane ethanol (A) and gasoline (G)

Ethanol is generally available as a byproduct of sugar production. It can be used as a biofuel alternative to gasoline, and is widely used in cars in Brazil. It is an alternative to gasoline, and may become the primary product of sugarcane processing, rather than sugar

In Brazil, gasoline is required to contain at least 22% bioethanol. This bioethanol is sourced from Brazil's large sugarcane crop.

The production of ethanol from sugarcane is more energy efficient than from corn or sugar beets or palm/vegetable oils, particularly if cane bagasse is used to produce heat and power for the process. Furthermore, if biofuels are used for crop production and transport, the fossil energy input needed for each ethanol energy unit can be very low. EIA estimates that with an integrated sugarcane to ethanol technology, the well-to-wheels CO_{2} emissions can be 90% lower than conventional gasoline. A textbook on renewable energy describes the energy transformation:

Presently, 75 tons of raw sugarcane are produced annually per hectare in Brazil. The cane delivered to the processing plant is called burned and cropped (b&c), and represents 77% of the mass of the raw cane. The reason for this reduction is that the stalks are separated from the leaves (which are burned and whose ashes are left in the field as fertilizer), and from the roots that remain in the ground to sprout for the next crop. Average cane production is, therefore, 58 tons of b&c per hectare per year. ... Each ton of b&c yields 740 kg of juice (135 kg of sucrose and 605 kg of water) and 260 kg of moist bagasse (130 kg of dry bagasse). Since the lower heating value of sucrose is 16.5 MJ/kg, and that of the bagasse is 19.2 MJ/kg, the total heating value of a ton of b&c is 4.7 GJ of which 2.2 GJ come from the sucrose and 2.5 from the bagasse. ... Per hectare per year, the biomass produced corresponds to 0.27 TJ. This is equivalent to 0.86 W per square meter. Assuming an average insolation of 225 W per square meter, the photosynthetic efficiency of sugar cane is 0.38%. ... The 135 kg of sucrose found in 1 ton of b&c are transformed into 70 litres of ethanol with a combustion energy of 1.7 GJ. The practical sucrose-ethanol conversion efficiency is, therefore, 76% (compare with the theoretical 97%). ... One hectare of sugar cane yields 4,000 litres of ethanol per year (without any additional energy input, because the bagasse produced exceeds the amount needed to distill the final product). This, however, does not include the energy used in tilling, transportation, and so on. Thus, the solar energy-to-ethanol conversion efficiency is 0.13%.

== Bagasse applications ==
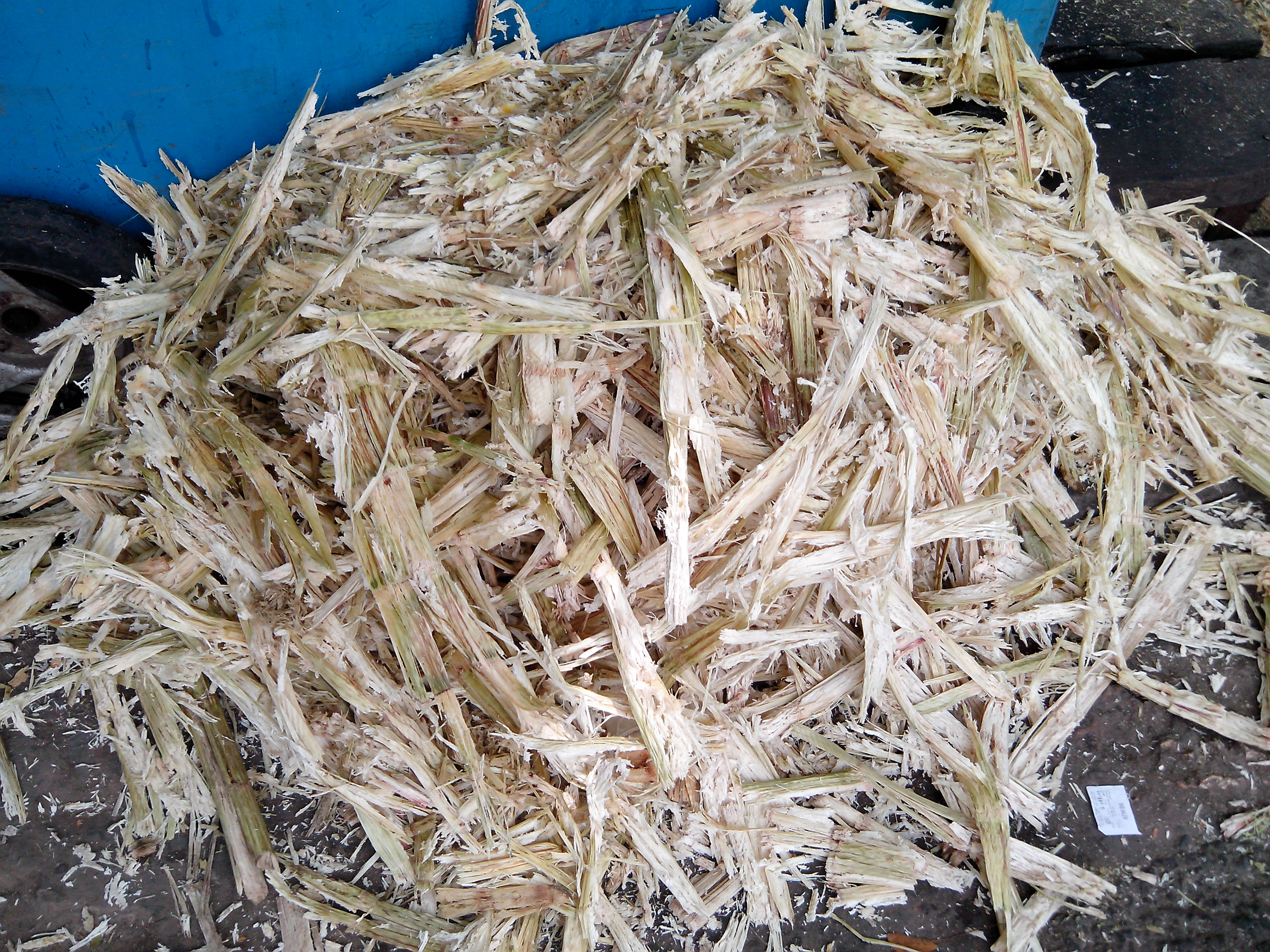
Sugarcane bagasse

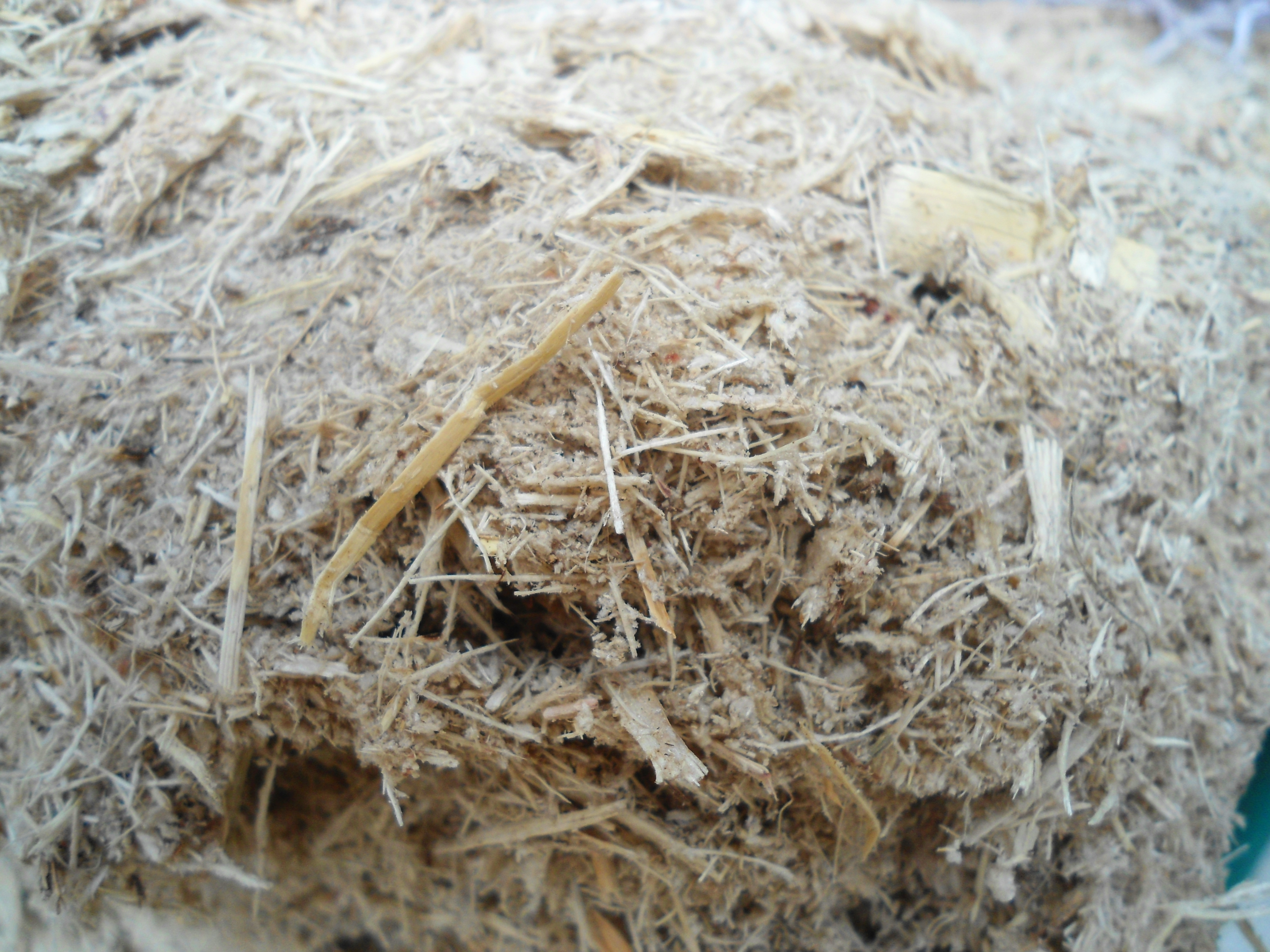
Baggasse at a sugarcane factory in Hainan, China.

Sugarcane is a major crop in many countries. It is one of the plants with the highest bioconversion efficiency. Sugarcane crop is able to efficiently fix solar energy, yielding some 55 tonnes of dry matter per hectare of land annually. After harvest, the crop produces sugar juice and bagasse, the fibrous dry matter. This dry matter is biomass with potential as fuel for energy production. Bagasse can also be used as an alternative source of pulp for paper production.

Sugarcane bagasse is a potentially abundant source of energy for large producers of sugarcane, such as Brazil, India, and China. According to one report, with use of latest technologies, bagasse produced annually in Brazil has the potential of meeting 20% of Brazil's energy consumption by 2020.

=== Electricity production ===
A number of countries, in particular those lacking fossil fuels, have implemented energy conservation and efficiency measures to minimize the energy used in cane processing, and export any excess electricity to the grid. Bagasse is usually burned to produce steam, which in turn creates electricity. Current technologies, such as those in use in Mauritius, produce over 100 kWh of electricity per tonne of bagasse. With a total world harvest of over one billion tonnes of sugarcane per year, the global energy potential from bagasse is over 100,000 GWh. Using Mauritius as a reference, an annual potential of 10,000 GWh of additional electricity could be produced throughout Africa. Electrical generation from bagasse could become quite important, particularly to the rural populations of sugarcane producing nations.

Recent cogeneration technology plants are being designed to produce from 200 to over 300 kWh of electricity per tonne of bagasse. As sugarcane is a seasonal crop, shortly after harvest the supply of bagasse would peak, requiring power generation plants to strategically manage the storage of bagasse.

=== Biogas production ===
A greener alternative to burning bagasse for the production of electricity is to convert bagasse into biogas. Technologies are being developed to use enzymes to transform bagasse into advanced biofuel and biogas.

== Sugarcane as food ==
Cane juice
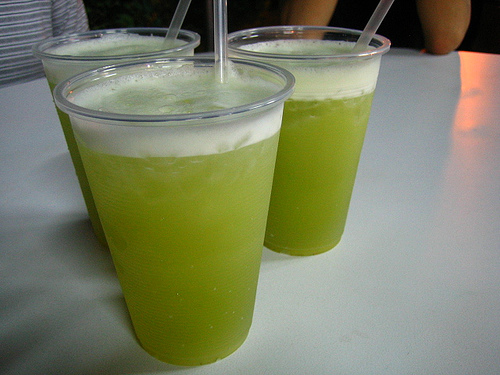
- Freshly squeezed sugarcane juice

Nutritional value per 100 grams
- Energy: 242 kJ (58 kcal)
- Carbohydrates: 13.11 g
- Sugars glucose fructose: 12.85 g 2.27 g 0.55 g
- Dietary fiber: 0.56 g
- Fat: 0.40 g
- Protein: 0.16 g
Vitamins and minerals
Vitamins	Quantity %DV^{†}
Vitamin B6	24% 0.40 mg
Folate (B9)	11% 44.53 μg
Vitamin C	7% 6.73 mg
Minerals	Quantity %DV^{†}
Calcium	1% 18 mg
Iron	6% 1.12 mg
Magnesium	3% 13.03 mg
Phosphorus	2% 22.08 mg
Potassium	5% 150 mg
Sodium	0% 1.16 mg
Zinc	1% 0.14 mg
- Nutrient information from the Indian Food Composition Database
- ^{†}Percentages estimated using US recommendations for adults, except for potassium, which is estimated based on expert recommendation from the National Academies.

In most regions where sugarcane is cultivated, a wide range of foods and beverages are produced directly from the plant.

The following foods and drinks are derived from sugarcane:

- Cane vinegar - traditional vinegar from the Philippines made from sugarcane juice fermented in clay jars. Also produced in other countries in modern times. Left to ferment further, it becomes the alcoholic drink basi.
- Gâteau de Sirop – a cake made using sugarcane syrup.
- Jaggery – a solidified molasses, known as gur, gud, or gul in modern Indo-Aryan. It is traditionally produced by evaporating sugarcane juice into a thick mass that is cooled and molded. Modern production methods may partially freeze-dry the juice to reduce caramelization and lighten the color. Jaggery is used as a sweetener in traditional dishes, sweets, and desserts.
- Molasses – a syrupy by-product used as a sweetener and as an accompaniment to foods such as cheese or cookies.
- Panela – solid blocks of sucrose and fructose produced by boiling and evaporating sugarcane juice; it is a staple food in Colombia and other parts of Central and South America.
- Rapadura – a minimally refined sugarcane product, common in Latin American countries such as Brazil, Argentina, and Venezuela (where it is known as papelón) and the Caribbean.
- Raw sugarcane – chewed directly to extract the juice.
- Rock candy – crystallized sugarcane juice.
- Sayur nganten – an Indonesian soup made from the stem of trubuk (Saccharum edule), a type of sugarcane.
- Sugarcane juice – fresh juice extracted by hand or small mills and commonly served with lemon and ice. It is known by many regional names, including air tebu, usacha rass, guarab, guarapa, guarapo, papelón, aseer asab, ganna sharbat, mosto, caldo de cana, and nước mía.
- Sugarcane liquor - various alcoholic beverages distilled from sugarcane juice or molasses.

- Aguardiente - a distilled liquor from Spain and Portugal
- Cachaça – a distilled alcoholic beverage made from sugarcane juice; it is the most popular spirit in Brazil.
- Clairin - distilled liquor made from sugarcane juice from Haiti
- Desi daru - distilled liquor made from molasses from India
- Falernum – a sweet, slightly alcoholic liqueur made from sugarcane juice from the Caribbean
- Guaro - distilled liquor from Latin America
- Rum - liquor made from fermenting and distilling sugarcane juice or molasses from Barbados
- Viche – a homebrewed alcoholic beverage from Colombia

- Sugarcane wine – various fermented alcoholic beverages made from sugarcane juice. It has numerous types from different cultures:

- Basi - traditional sugarcane wine made from sugarcane juice and flavored with samak tree (Macaranga tanarius) bark extracts from the northern Philippines
- Byais - traditional mead made from honey, lengkuas ginger, and sugarcane juice from Mindanao, Philippines.
- Intus - traditional alcoholic drink made from sugarcane juice boiled into a syrup and mixed with kabarawan (Neolitsea villosa) bark from the Visayas and Mindanao islands of the Philippines
- Palek - traditional sugarcane wine made from sugarcane juice and flavored with black ebony (Diospyros ferrea) bark from the Batanes Islands of the Philippines
- Sidhu - traditional sugarcane wine made from sugarcane juice or molasses from South Asia

- Syrup – a traditional sweetener used in soft drinks worldwide, though in the United States it has been largely replaced by high fructose corn syrup due to lower costs associated with corn subsidies and sugar tariffs.

In the 21st century, sugar is estimated to contribute approximately 20% of the total caloric intake in modern diets.

== Sugarcane as feed ==
Many parts of the sugarcane are commonly used as animal feeds where the plants are cultivated. The leaves make a good forage for ruminants.

== Gallery ==
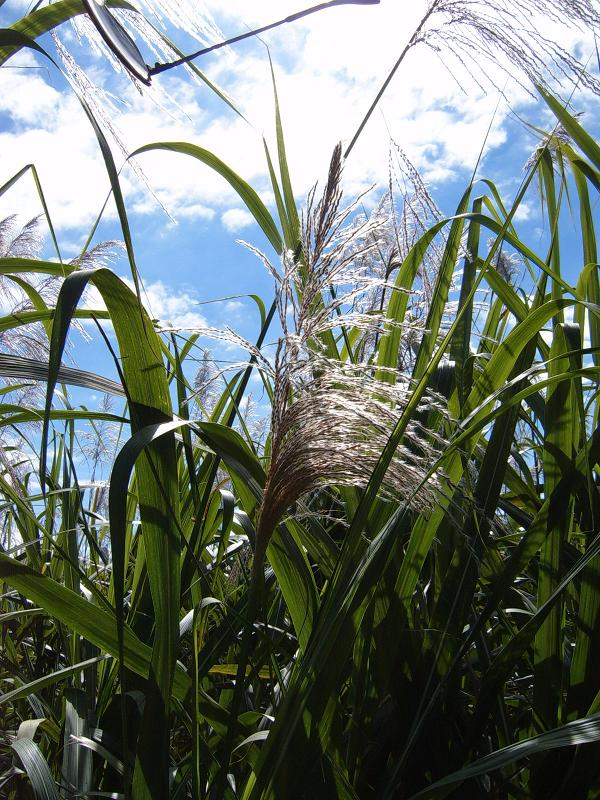
Sugarcane flowering

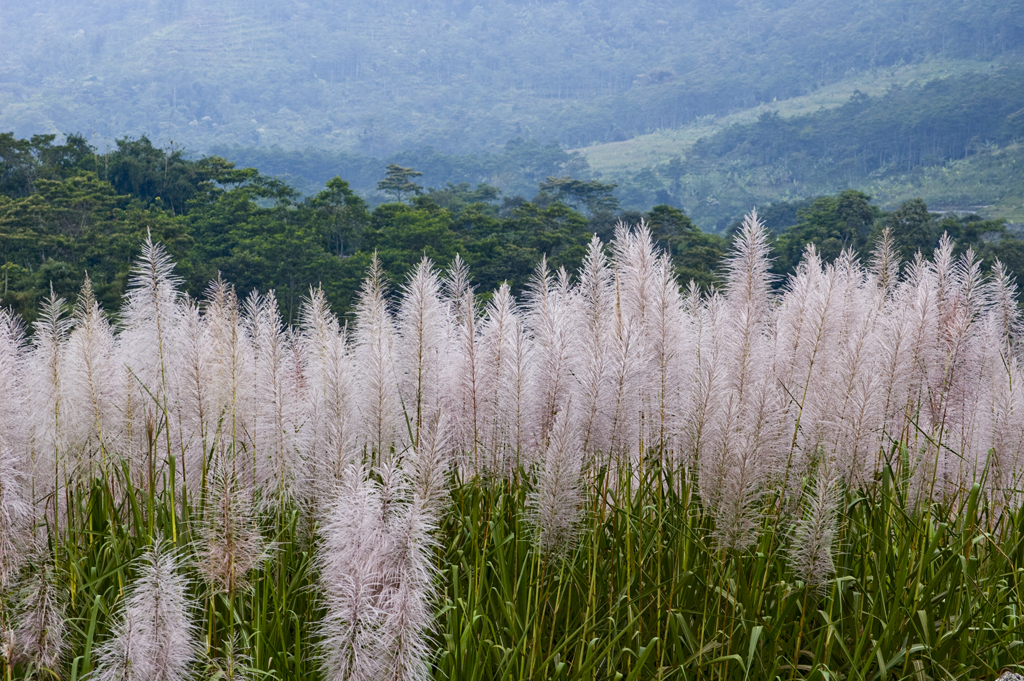
Flowers of sugarcane

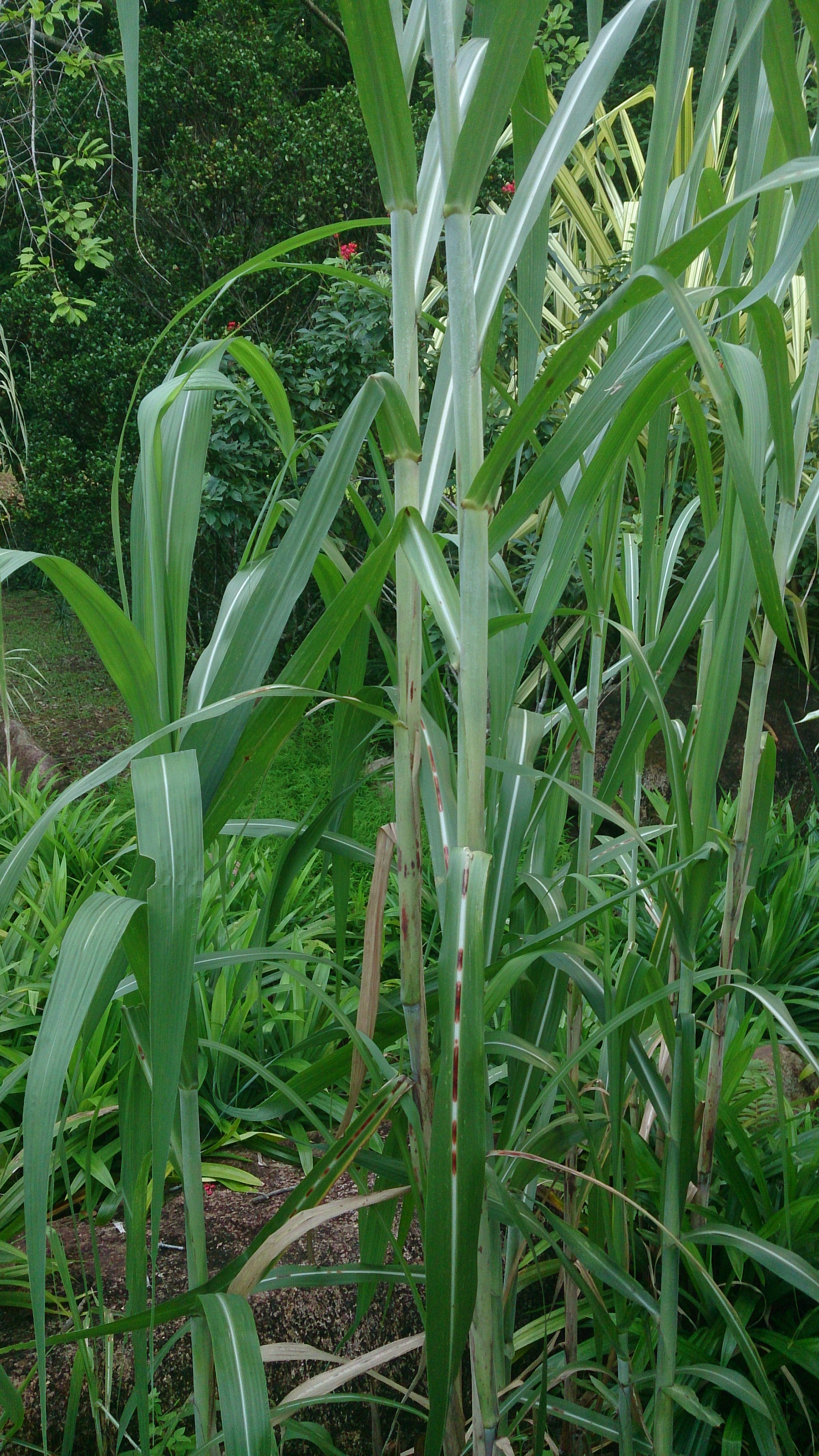
Sugarcane

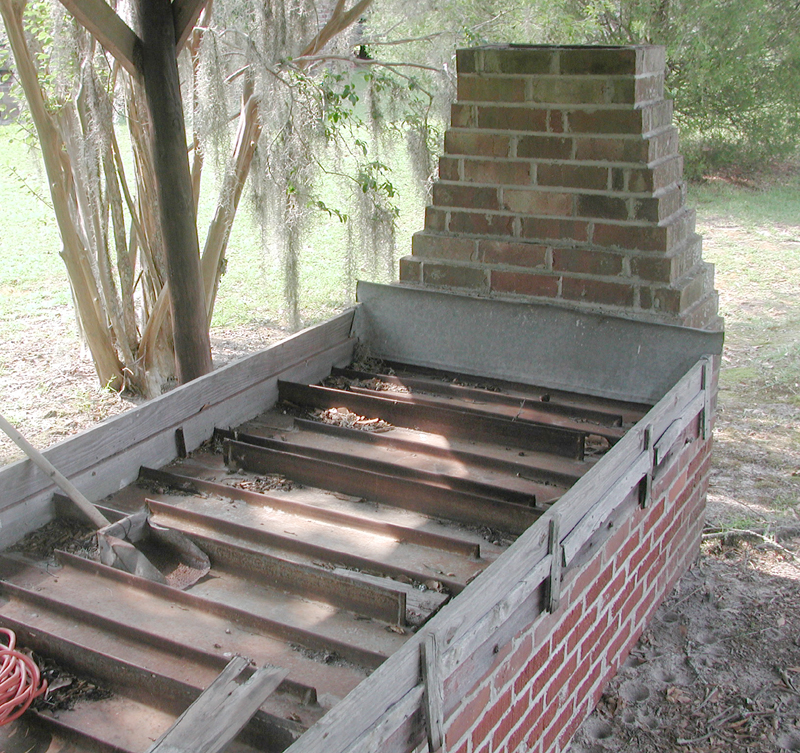
Evaporator with baffled pan and foam dipper for making ribbon cane syrup

A video of sugarcane juice extraction

== See also ==
- Sugar industry of the Philippines
- Sugar plantations in Hawaii
- Sugar plantations in the Caribbean
- Trapiche

== Sources ==
This article incorporates text from a free content work. Licensed under CC BY-SA IGO 3.0 (license statement/permission). Text taken from World Food and Agriculture – Statistical Yearbook 2023, FAO.
