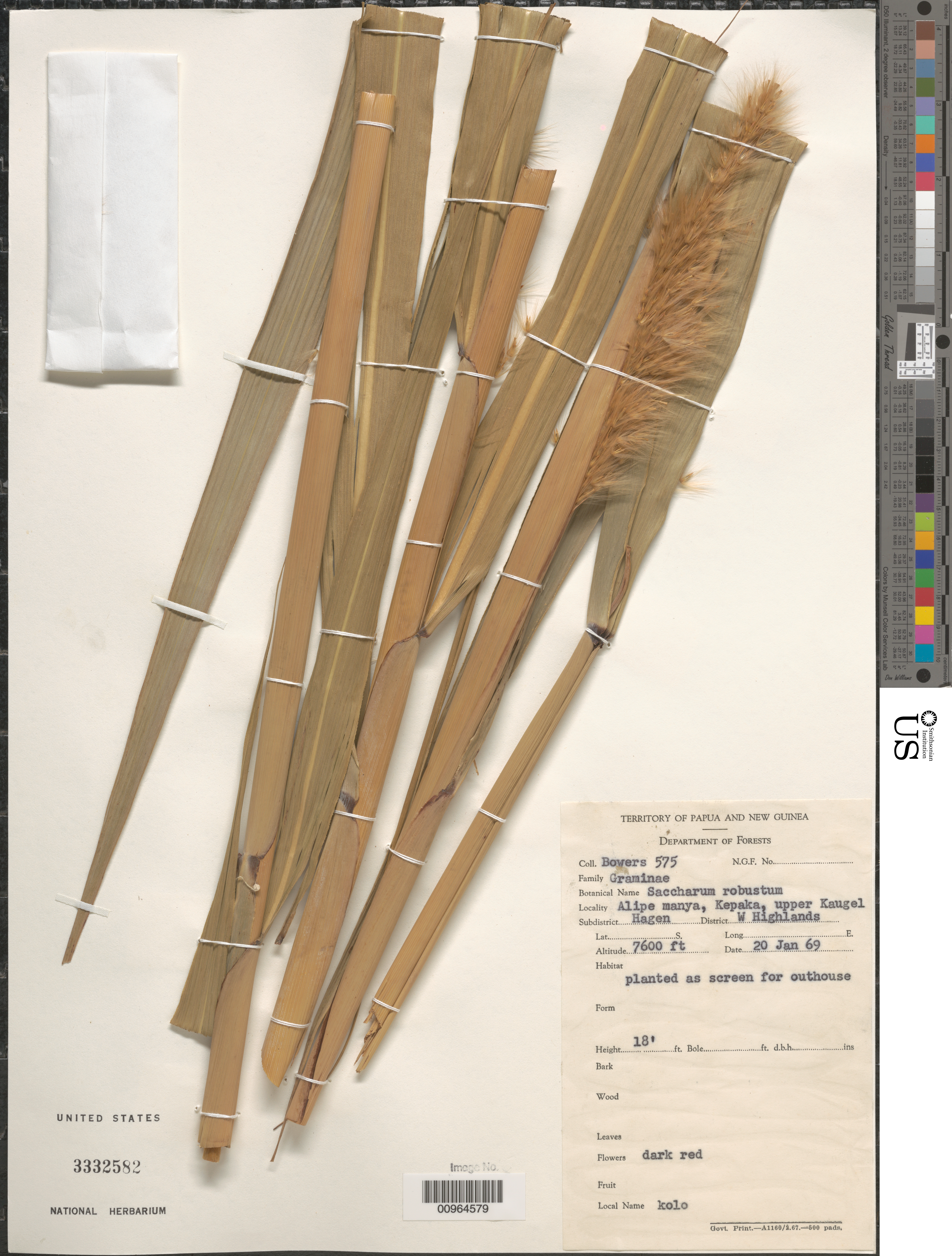

Scientific classification
- Kingdom: Plantae
- Clade: Tracheophytes
- Clade: Angiosperms
- Clade: Monocots
- Clade: Commelinids
- Order: Poales
- Family: Poaceae
- Subfamily: Panicoideae
- Genus: Saccharum
- Species: S. robustum

Binomial name
- Saccharum robustum Brandes & Jesw. ex Grassl

= Saccharum robustum =

Species of grass

Saccharum robustum, the robust cane, is a species of plant found in New Guinea.

== Ecology ==
Eumetopina flavipes, the island sugarcane planthopper, a species of planthopper present throughout South East Asia which is a vector for the sugarcane pathogen Ramu stunt disease, occurs also on S. robustum.

The pink sugarcane borer (Sesamia grisescens), a moth of the family Noctuidae found in Papua New Guinea, Seram, the Moluccas and New Britain, also feeds on S. robustum.

Scirpophaga excerptalis, the white top borer or the sugarcane top borer, a moth in the family Crambidae, also feeds on S. robustum.

== See also ==
- Domesticated plants and animals of Austronesia
