= Stunt (botany) =

Plant disease that results in dwarfing

In botany and agriculture, stunting describes a plant disease that results in dwarfing and loss of vigor. It may be caused by infectious or noninfectious means. Stunted growth can affect foliage and crop yields, as well as eating quality in edible plants. Stunted growth can be prevented through controlling quality of seeds, soil, and proper watering practices. Treatment will vary greatly depending on the root cause of the stunting.

== Infectious ==
A stunt caused by infection can either be prevented or treated. Anti-microbial peptides may offer generalized protection against plant diseases that cause stunted growth.

== Noninfectious ==
Stunted growth not caused by infection may be due to a wide variety of environmental factors. Environmental factors that affect plant growth include light, temperature, water, humidity and nutrition. There may be water imbalance, poor planting practices, poor nutrition, or physical injury to the plant. Using high quality seed and soil may mitigate stunted growth.

== See also ==
- Soil retrogression and degradation
- Soil pH
- Soil types
- Ramu stunt disease, a disease of the sugarcane widespread throughout Papua New Guinea
