= Eumetopina flavipes =

Scientific classification
- Kingdom: Animalia
- Phylum: Arthropoda
- Clade: Pancrustacea
- Class: Insecta
- Order: Hemiptera
- Suborder: Auchenorrhyncha
- Infraorder: Fulgoromorpha
- Family: Delphacidae
- Genus: Eumetopina
- Species: E. flavipes

Binomial name
- Eumetopina flavipes Muir, 1913

Species of true bug

Eumetopina flavipes, the island sugarcane planthopper, is a species of planthopper present throughout South East Asia. E. flavipes is a vector for Ramu stunt disease, a plant disease which affects sugarcane. Ramu stunt disease is widespread throughout Papua New Guinea, but has not been detected in Australia.

Eumetopina is thought to have evolved in Papua New Guinea, where up to four undescribed species have been collected, but many more may be present. In Papua New Guinea, E. flavipes occurs on Saccharum officinarum, S. robustum, S. edule and Saccharum hybrids sugarcane. Virus-free populations of E. flavipes are present on Saccharum hybrids and S. officinarum on many islands in the Torres Strait, and a number of small populations persist on the northern Cape York Peninsula - the very tip of Queensland, mainland Australia.
