= Sugarcane wax =

Identifiers
CAS Number	2496446-24-1

Properties
Appearance	Light brown solid
Density	0.90 g/cm^{3}
Solubility in water	Insoluble
Solubility in hydrocarbons	Soluble

Hazards
Flash point	> 250 °C (open cup)
- Except where otherwise noted, data are given for materials in their standard state (at 25 °C [77 °F], 100 kPa). Infobox references

Sugarcane wax is a wax extracted from sugarcane.

== Production ==
The production of sugarcane wax is difficult and economically intensive. Sugarcane is used almost exclusively to produce sugar. More importantly, there is just about 0.1% of sugarcane wax in sugarcane. Therefore, economic productions can only be found in the major cultivation countries Brazil, India, China, Thailand, Pakistan and Mexico. During the production of sugar remains a filter residue, the so-called bagasse. The sugar cane wax is obtained from this filter residue. In that process, plant residues and chlorophyll are separated from the sugarcane.

== History ==
Around 1840, for the first time the American pharmacist Avequin was able to produce sugarcane wax out of the bagasse in a relatively pure form. In his quantitative analysis he found that there is just 0.1% of the whitish to dark yellow wax in sugarcane. In 1909, more than 60 years later, the Frenchman A. Wynberg was granted a patent for the production of sugarcane wax by extracting it out of the bagasse. During World War I, one of the first companies that produced large amounts of sugarcane waxes established in the South African province Natal. Already in 1924, 6000 tons of dark sugarcane wax were produced there. This amount was mainly used for the production of candles for the Russian Orthodox Church. Because of the Russian Revolution and the associated war against the church the consumption of sugarcane wax decreased so much that the company had to be closed. In the following period, sugarcane wax was produced in the US, mainly in Louisiana where there were up to 22 sugarcane wax producers. Already in 1922, M. Rindl described applications for sugarcane wax in detail, for example as substitute for Carnauba, Bee and Montan waxes.

== Ingredients ==
Sugarcane wax consists of the following ingredients: about 70% of alcohols of long-chain hydrocarbons having chain lengths of C 18 to C 32, wax acids having chain lengths of C 18 to C 32, ω-hydroxycarboxylic acids and aromatic carboxylic acids. Also fatty alcohols (wax alcohols) and diols are alcohol components. Besides that, about 5 to 10% consist of unesterified diols, long-chain wax acids such as behenic acid, cerotic acid, lignoceric acid or melissic acid and saturated hydrocarbons. Untreated sugarcane wax contains up to 25% of resin and moreover, up to 60% polycosanol (octacosanol) which can be extracted from sugarcane wax in the pure form.

== Characteristics ==
Sugarcane wax is indigestible and harmless to health. In case of accidental consumption it is excreted. In its refined form it has a light yellowish colour. Due to the high melting point of 75 to 80 °C it remains stable even if exposed to direct sunlight. Sugarcane wax offers a good oil and solvent retention for anionic bright emulsions.

== Applications ==
=== Food ===
Until the 1960s, sugar cane wax was added to the production of chewing gum as an edible wax. In this process the sugar cane wax acted as elastomer or as plasticizer and consistency regulator. In 1943, J. W. Schlegel and L. Lang were granted a patent to flour donuts with sugar. The ground sugar was mixed with 0.4% of sugar cane wax. Thus, the donuts became fat- and water-repellent and kept their fresh appearance longer. Also chocolate was thinly coated with sugarcane wax. The gloss durability improved, the melting reduced and the packing was relieved as well. In order to keep vegetables and fruits fresh or to make it look fresh emulsions from sugarcane wax mixed with other natural waxes were prepared. The vegetables or fruits were immersed in the emulsions or sprayed with wax emulsions.

=== Medical applications ===
In the 1970s, a further field of application for polycosanols made from sugarcane wax was found in the medical industry, the lowering of the cholesterol level. This had been pursued with various investigations by the Cuban laboratory Dalmer S.A. in Havana, especially against the background of the fall of the Iron Curtain. During this time, there were many - also controversial - patent applications. The last known patent was applied in 1998 by S.A. Dalmer. Those results were analysed, summarised and developed further by I. Gouni-Berthold and H. K. Berthold. From 2004 to 2007 the cholesterol-lowering effect of polycosanols made from sugarcane wax was transferred to montan waxes because of their very similar chemical structure by E. Krendlinger and M. Neumaier. Currently, nutritional supplements containing polycosanols for lowering the cholesterol levels are offered in a wide range.

=== Currently ===
Sugarcane wax is not only suitable for technical applications but also for applications in the food industry. So, sugarcane wax can be used as care product (shoe, floor and car care), in the leather and as well as for applications in the additive and cosmetics industry. Furthermore, it is applicable in the paints and printing inks industry and for the production of candles.
