= Ramu stunt disease =

Disease of sugar cane

- Common names: Sugarcane Ramu stunt disease
- Causal agents: virus or bacterium
- Hosts: sugarcane
- Vectors: Eumetopina flavipes
- Distribution: Papua New Guinea
- Symptoms: Stunt

The Ramu stunt disease is a disease of the sugarcane widespread throughout Papua New Guinea, but not detected in Australia. Eumetopina flavipes, the island sugarcane planthopper, is a species of planthopper present throughout South East Asia which is a vector for the disease.

It was first detected in the 1980s. It is thought to be either of viral origin or associated with a Phytoplasma bacterium.

== See also ==
- Ramu, a river in northern Papua New Guinea
- Stunt (botany), a plant disease that results in dwarfing and loss of vigor
