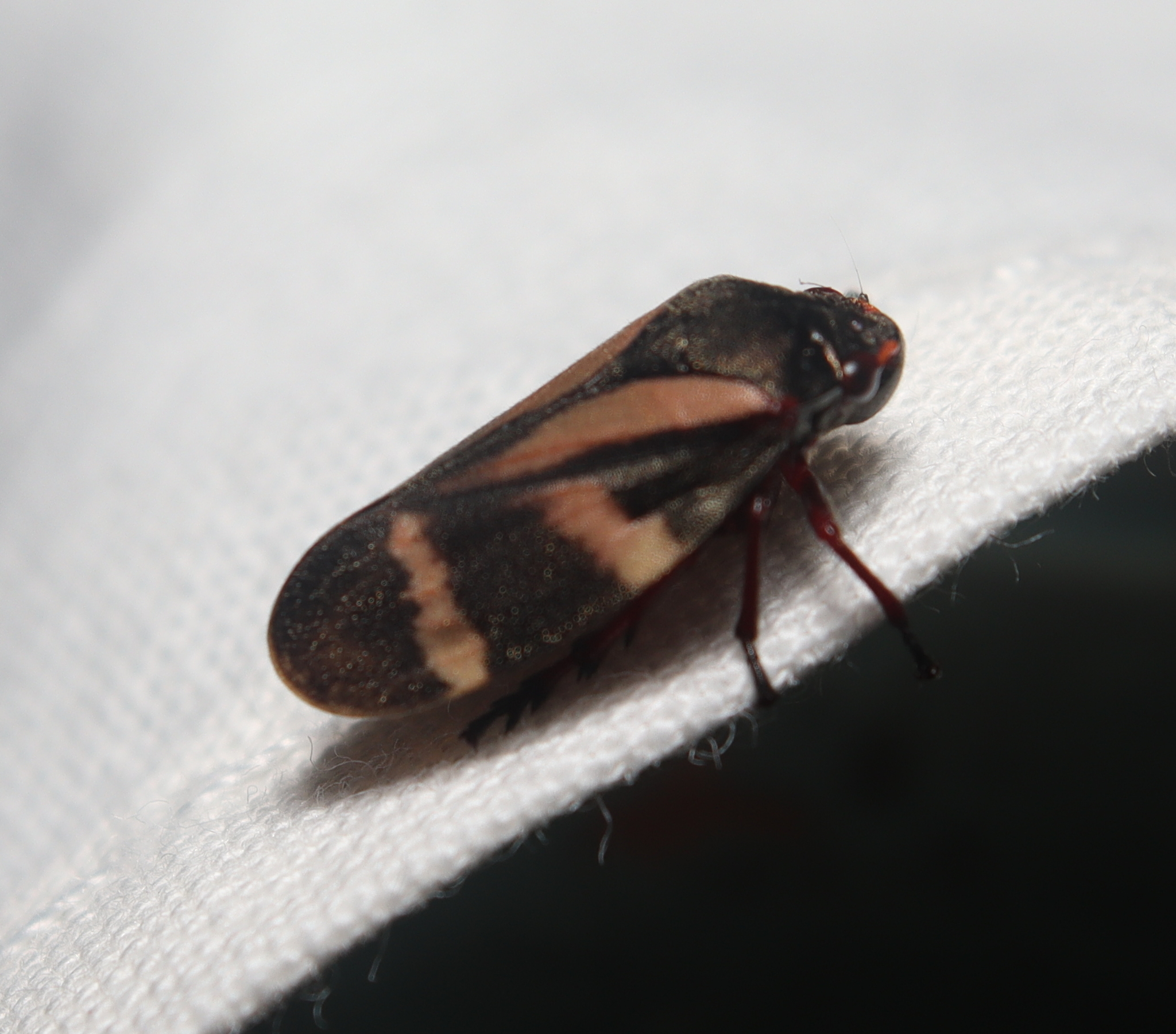

Scientific classification
- Kingdom: Animalia
- Phylum: Arthropoda
- Clade: Pancrustacea
- Class: Insecta
- Order: Hemiptera
- Suborder: Auchenorrhyncha
- Family: Ischnorhinidae
- Genus: Deois
- Species: D. flavopicta

Binomial name
- Deois flavopicta (Stål, 1854)

= Deois flavopicta =

Species of insect

Deois flavopicta is a species from the subgenus Acanthodeois.
