= Vild med dans =

- Genre: Entertainment
- Presented by: Andrea Elisabeth Rudolph (1–2, 4–6); Peter Hansen (1–2); Claus Elming (3–14); Christine Lorentzen (3); Christiane Schaumburg-Müller (7–9, 15–18); Sarah Grünewald (10–20); Martin Johannes Larsen (19–22); Cilia Trappaud (21–22)
- Judges: Jens Werner (1–19); Anne Laxholm (1–20); Britt Bendixen (1–18); Kim Dahl (1); Thomas Evers Poulsen (2); Allan Tornsberg (3–7); Nikolaj Hübbe (8–20); Marianne Eihilt (16–22); Sonny Fredie Pedersen (19–22); Guest Judges (20); Lene James Mikkelsen (21–22)
- Country of origin: Denmark
- Original language: Danish
- No. of seasons: 22

Original release
- Network: TV 2
- Release: 16 April 2005 – 28 November 2025

Vild med dans is the Danish version of the British reality TV competition Strictly Come Dancing and is part of the Dancing with the Stars franchise. It is shown on TV 2 in Denmark. Seasons 1 and 2 were co-hosted by Andrea Elisabeth Rudolph and Peter Hansen. Rudolph and Hansen were replaced in season 3 by Christine Lorentzen and Claus Elming. Rudolph returned to take Lorentzen's place as co-host from seasons 4 to 6. Season 7, 8 and 9 saw Christiane Schaumburg-Müller take Rudolph's place as Elming's co-host. Since season 10, Elming has co-hosted with Sarah Grünewald.

The original judges were Britt Bendixen, Jens Werner, Anne Laxholm and Kim Dahl . Dahl was replaced by Thomas Evers Poulsen, who is currently the only person to appear on the show as both a professional and judge. Allan Tornsberg took Poulsen's place as the fourth judge from seasons 3 through 7. Nikolaj Hübbe joined the panel as a replacement for Tornsberg in season 8 and has remained there since. The newest addition to the judges panel is Sonny Fredie Pedersen who joined the show in 2022 on season 19.

Season 22 will be the last season of the show.

== Hosts ==
Key:

Main host
Guest host

| Host | Season 1 | Season 2 | Season 3 | Season 4 | Season 5 | Season 6 | Season 7 | Season 8 | Season 9 | Season 10 | Season 11 | Season 12 | Season 13 | Season 14 | Season 15 | Season 16 | Season 17 | Season 18 | Season 19 | Season 20 | Season 21 | Season 22 |
|---|---|---|---|---|---|---|---|---|---|---|---|---|---|---|---|---|---|---|---|---|---|---|
| Peter Hansen | | | | | | | | | | | | | | | | | | | | | | |
| Andrea Elisabeth Rudolph^{1} | | | | | | | | | | | | | | | | | | | | | | |
| Claus Elming | | | | | | | | | | | | | | | | | | | | | | |
| Christine Lorentzen | | | | | | | | | | | | | | | | | | | | | | |
| Christiane Schaumburg-Müller | | | | | | | | | | | | | | | | | | | | | | |
| Sarah Grünewald | | | | | | | | | | | | | | | | | | | | | | |
| Martin Johannes Larsen | | | | | | | | | | | | | | | | | | | | | | |
| Cilia Trappaud | | | | | | | | | | | | | | | | | | | | | | |
| Sara Maria Franch-Mærkedahl^{2} | | | | | | | | | | | | | | | | | | | | | | |

Notes
^1 From season 9 to 11 and 13, Andrea Elisabeth Rudolph returned as guest host for one week.
^2 In season 12, Sara Maria Franch-Mærkedahl served as guest host for one week.

== Series overview ==
| Season | Start | Finish | Winning celebrity | Winning professional | Presenters | Judging panel |
|---|---|---|---|---|---|---|
| 1 | 16 April 2005 | 4 June 2005 | Mia Lyhne | Thomas Evers Poulsen | Peter Hansen; Andrea Elisabeth Rudolph | Britt Bendixen; Jens Werner; Anne Laxholm; Kim Dahl |
| 2 | 16 September 2005 | 25 November 2005 | David Owe | Vickie Jo Ringgaard | Peter Hansen; Andrea Elisabeth Rudolph | Jens Werner; Anne Laxholm; Britt Bendixen; Thomas Evers Poulsen |
| 3 | 15 September 2006 | 17 November 2006 | Christina Roslyng | Steen Lund | Claus Elming; Christine Lorentzen | Britt Bendixen; Jens Werner; Anne Laxholm; Allan Tornsberg |
| 4 | 14 September 2007 | 16 November 2007 | Robert Hansen | Marianne Eihit | Andrea Elisabeth Rudolph; Claus Elming | Britt Bendixen; Jens Werner; Anne Laxholm; Allan Tornsberg |
| 5 | 29 August 2008 | 31 October 2008 | Joachim Olsen | Marianne Eihit | Andrea Elisabeth Rudolph; Claus Elming | Britt Bendixen; Jens Werner; Anne Laxholm; Allan Tornsberg |
| 6 | 18 September 2009 | 20 November 2009 | Casper Elgaard | Vickie Jo Ringgaard | Andrea Elisabeth Rudolph; Claus Elming | Britt Bendixen; Jens Werner; Anne Laxholm; Allan Tornsberg |
| 7 | 17 September 2010 | 19 November 2010 | Cecilie Hother | Mads Vad | Claus Elming; Christiane Schaumberg-Müller | Britt Bendixen; Jens Werner; Anne Laxholm; Allan Tornsberg |
| 8 | 9 September 2011 | 25 November 2011 | Sophie Fjellvang-Sølling | Silas Holst | Claus Elming; Christiane Schaumberg-Müller | Britt Bendixen; Jens Werner; Anne Laxholm; Nikolaj Hübbe |
| 9 | 7 September 2012 | 9 November 2012 | Joakim Ingversen | Claudia Rex | Claus Elming; Christiane Schaumberg-Müller | Britt Bendixen; Jens Werner; Anne Laxholm; Nikolaj Hübbe |
| 10 | 13 September 2013 | 29 November 2013 | Mie Skov | Mads Vad | Claus Elming; Sarah Grünewald | Britt Bendixen; Jens Werner; Anne Laxholm; Nikolaj Hübbe |
| 11 | 12 September 2014 | 28 November 2014 | Sara Maria Franch-Mærkedahl | Silas Holst | Claus Elming; Sarah Grünewald | Britt Bendixen; Jens Werner; Anne Laxholm; Nikolaj Hübbe |
| 12 | 11 September 2015 | 27 November 2015 | Ena Spottag | Thomas Evers Poulsen | Claus Elming; Sarah Grünewald | Britt Bendixen; Jens Werner; Anne Laxholm; Nikolaj Hübbe |
| 13 | 9 September 2016 | 25 November 2016 | Sarah Mahfoud | Morten Kjeldgaard | Claus Elming; Sarah Grünewald | Britt Bendixen; Jens Werner; Anne Laxholm; Nikolaj Hübbe |
| 14 | 8 September 2017 | 24 November 2017 | Sofie Lassen-Kahlke | Michael Olesen | Claus Elming; Sarah Grünewald | Britt Bendixen; Jens Werner; Anne Laxholm; Nikolaj Hübbe |
| 15 | 7 September 2018 | 23 November 2018 | Simon Stenspil | Asta Björk Ivarsdottir | Christiane Schaumberg-Müller; Sarah Grünewald | Britt Bendixen; Jens Werner; Anne Laxholm; Nikolaj Hübbe |
| 16 | 13 September 2019 | 29 November 2019 | Jakob Fauerby | Silas Holst | Christiane Schaumberg-Müller; Sarah Grünewald | Jens Werner; Anne Laxholm; Marianne Eihilt; Nikolaj Hübbe |
| 17 | 2 October 2020 | 19 December 2020 | Merete Mærkedahl | Thomas Evers Poulsen | Christiane Schaumberg-Müller; Sarah Grünewald | Jens Werner; Anne Laxholm; Britt Bendixen; Marianne Eihilt; Nikolaj Hübbe |
| 18 | 10 September 2021 | 26 November 2021 | Jimilian | Asta Björk Ivarsdottir | Christiane Schaumberg-Müller; Sarah Grünewald | Jens Werner; Anne Laxholm; Britt Bendixen; Marianne Eihilt; Nikolaj Hübbe |
| 19 | 9 September 2022 | 11 November 2022 | Caspar Phillipson | Malene Østergaard | Martin Johannes Larsen; Sarah Grünewald | Jens Werner; Anne Laxholm; Sonnie-Freddie Pedersen; Marianne Eihilt; Nikolaj Hübbe |
| 20 | 22 September 2023 | 24 November 2023 | Kasper Fisker | Karina Frimodt | Martin Johannes Larsen; Sarah Grünewald | Anne Laxholm; Sonnie-Freddie Pedersen; Marianne Eihilt; Nikolaj Hübbe; Guest Judges |
| 21 | 20 September 2024 | 22 November 2024 | Anna Munch | Eugen Miu | Martin Johannes Larsen; Cilia Trappaud | Sonnie-Freddie Pedersen; Marianne Eihilt; Lene James Mikkelsen; Guest Judges |
| 22 | 26 September 2025 | 28 November 2025 | Jasmin Lind | Michael Olesen | Martin Johannes Larsen; Cilia Trappaud | Sonnie-Freddie Pedersen; Marianne Eihilt; Lene James Mikkelsen |

== Professional partners ==
Color key:

Winner
Runner-up
3rd place
Celebrity partner was eliminated first for the season
Celebrity partner withdrew from the competition
Proefssional Dancer withdrew from the competition
A professional couple of weeks, and then does not appear on the show
Still participating on the show

| Professional dancer | Season | | | | | | | | | | | | | | | | | | | | | |
| Professional dancer | 1 | 2 | 3 | 4 | 5 | 6 | 7 | 8 | 9 | 10 | 11 | 12 | 13 | 14 | 15 | 16 | 17 | 18 | 19 | 20 | 21 | 22 |
|---|---|---|---|---|---|---|---|---|---|---|---|---|---|---|---|---|---|---|---|---|---|---|
| Aslak Amtrup | | | | | | | | | | | | Katrine Fruelund | | | | | | | | | | |
| Jenna Bagge | | | | | | | | | | | USO | Patrick Berdino | Patrick Jørgensen | René Holten Poulsen | Emil Thorup | Umut Sakarya | Albert Rosin Barson | Micki Cheng | Joel Hyrland | Fredrik Trudslev | | Peter Løvenkrands |
| Katrine Bonde | | | | | Kenneth Carlsen | Noam Halby | Kristian Jensen | | | Claes Bang | Thomas Wivel | | | | | | | | | | | |
| Lars Christensen | Stine Stengade | Mayianne Dinesen | | | | | | | | | | | | | | | | | | | | |
| Marc Christensen | | | | | | | | | Jeanette Ottesen Gray | Charlotte Fich | | | Julie Bertelsen | | | Anne Dorte Michelsen | | | | | | |
| René Christensen | Marianne Florman | Bettina Aller | Anna David | Paula Larrain | | | | | | | | | | | | | | | | | | |
| Luise Crone Dons | | | | | | René Dif | | | | | | Chris Christoffersen | Nicholas Nybro | | | | | | | | | |
| Tine Dahl | | | | | | | | Al Agami | | | | | | | | | | | | | | |
| Soffie Dalsgaard | Klaus Bondam | Allan Olsen | Nikolaj Christensen | Nicolai Moltke-Leth | | | | | | | | | | | | | | | | | | |
| Marianne Eihilt | Erik Peitersen | Eskild Ebbesen | Ole Olsen | Robert Hansen | Joachim B. Olsen | | | Tommy Kenter | | | | | | | | | | | | | | |
| Thomas Evers Poulsen | Mia Lyhne | | Annette Heick | Lisbeth Østergaard | Anne-Mette Rasmussen | Pernille Højmark | Christina Hembo | | Monica Christiansen | Mathilde Norholt | Astrid Krag | Ena Spottag | Kirsten Siggaard | Dak Wichangoen | Signe Lindkvist | Chirstel Pixi | Merete Mærkedahl | Mascha Vang | Natasha Brock | Özlem Cekic | Rachel Ellebye | Camilla Ottesen |
| Viktoria Franova | | | Simon Mathew | | Oliver Bjerrehuus | | | Nicolaj Kopernikus | | | | | | | | | | | | | | |
| Karina Frimodt | | | | | | | Kurt Thyboe | Ole Kibsgaard | Rasmus Nøhr | Uffe Holm | | John "Faxe" Jensen | Søren Fauli | Daniel Svensson | Rolf Sørensen | Christopher Læssø | Janus Nabil Bakrawi | Michael Katz Krefeld | Nicholas Kawamura | Kasper Fisker | | Gustav Salinas |
| Mille Funk | | | | | | | | | | | | Rasmus Jarlov | Mathias Käki Jørgensen | Christian Bækgaard | Esben Dalgaard Andersen | Mikkel Kesler | Kristian Bech | Lakserytteren (Rasmus Kolbe) | | | Victor Gairy Aasmul | Skinz |
| Mette Georgio | | | | Said Chayesteh | | | | | | | | | | | | | | | | | | |
| Ronnie Handskemager | | | | | | | | | | Saseline Sørensen | | | | | | | | | | | | |
| Silas Holst | | | | | Szhirley | Malena Belafonte | Laura Drasbæk | Sophie Fjellvang-Sølling | Louise Mieritz | | Sara Maria Franch-Mærkedahl | | | | | Jakob Fauerby | Nukâka Coster-Waldau | Lise Rønne | | | | |
| Anders Jacobson | | | | | | | | Eva Nabe Poulsen | | | | | | | | | | | | | | |
| Bo Loft Jensen | | Birthe Kjær | | Benedikte Hansen | | | | | | | | | | | | | | | | | | |
| Tobias Karlsson | Sofie Stougaard | Zindy Laursen | | | Tina Lund | | | Hella Joof | | | | | | | | | | | | | | |
| Morten Kjeldgaard | | | | | | Line Baun Danielsen | | | | Maria Lucia Rosenberg | Ditte Ylva Olsen | Stephania Potalivo | Sarah Mahfoud | Iben Hjejle | Laila Friis-Salling | Coco O. | Sara Bro | Pernille Blume | Katerina Pitzner | Mette Sommer | | Julie Rudbæk |
| Klaus Kongsdal | | | Lærke Winther Andersen | | | | | | | | | | | | | | | | | | | |
| Sofie Kruuse | | | | | | | | | | Allan Simonsen | Helge Vammen | | Gorm Wisweh | Lucas Hansen | Lars Christiansen | | | | | | | |
| Steen Lund | | Sisse Fisker | Christina Roslyng | Vicki Berlin | | | | Kaya Brüel | | | | | | | | | | | | | | |
| Mie Moltke | | Peter Mygind | Master Fatman | Lai Yde | Hans Pilgaard | Sven-Ole Thorsen | Michael Rasmussen | | Anders Krogh Jørgensen | Mattias Hundebøll | Besir Zeciri | James Sampson | Thomas Buttenschøn | Jokeren | Adam Duvå Hall | Michael Maze | Wafande | | | Soeren Le Schmidt | Kamal Hassan | |
| Frederik Nonnemann | | | | | | | | | | Le Gammeltoft | Tine Baun | Sharin Foo | Lene Beier | Julia Sofia Aastrup | Emmelie de Forest | Birgit Aaby | | | | | | |
| Michael Olesen | | | | Anne Louise Hassing | Anne-Grethe Bjarup Riis | Lisa Lents | Dicte | Pia Allerslev | Camilla Bendix | Mette Blomsterberg | Line Kruse | Karen Mukupa | Laura Bach | Sofie Lassen-Kahlke | Lucy Love | Neel Rønholt | Hilda Heick | | Heidi Frederikke Sigdal | | | Jasmin Lind |
| Malene Østergaard | | | | | | | | | Lars Rasmussen | Thomas Ernst | | | | | | | Lars Krogh Jeppesen | Abdi Ulad | Caspar Phillipson | Dulfi Al-Jabouri | Morten Hemmingsen | |
| Julia Petrovic | Jesper Skibby | | | | | | | | | | | | | | | | | | | | | |
| Claudia Rex | | | | | | Basim | Patrik Wozniacki | Patrick Nielsen | Joakim Ingversen | Mads Laudrup | Johannes Nymark | | | Simon Jul | | | | Freja Kirk | | | | |
| Vickie Jo Ringgaard | | David Owe | Gert Bo Jacobsen | Joachim Boldsen | | Casper Elgaard | Allan Nielsen | | | | | | | | | | | | | | | |
| Vivi Siggaard | | | | | | | | | | | | Erik Brandt | | | | | | | | | | |
| Patricia Tjørnelund | | | | | | | | | | | | | Sami Darr | | | | | | | | | |
| Mads Vad | | | Liv Corfixen | Rikke Hørlykke | Jette Torp | Lotte Friis | Cecilie Hother | Anne Sofie Espersen | Louise Spellerberg | Mie Skov | Paprika Steen | Søs Egelind | Mille Dinesen | Mie Ø. Nielsen | Molly Egelind | | Emili Sindlev | Michelle Kristensen | | Katinka Lærke Petersen | May Lifschitz | |
| Martin Wardinghus Glerup | | | | | | | Anne Kejser | | | | | | | | | | | | | | | |
| Julie Westergaard | | | | | | | | Thomas Voss | | | | | | | | | | | | | | |
| Ashli Williamson | | | | | Søren Bregendal | | | | | | | | | | | | | | | | | |
| Ann Wilson | | Kim Milton | | | | | | | | | | | | | | | | | | | | |
| Esbern Syhler-Hansen | | | | | | | | | | | | | | | Ane Høgsberg | Rosa Kildahl | | | | | | |
| Asta Bjórk Ivarsdottir | | | | | | | | | | | | | | | Simon Stenspil | Oscar Bjerrehus | Faustix | Jimilian | Daniel Wagner | Sebastian Bull Sarning | Rasmus Staghøj | Jesper Asholt |
| Martin Parnov Reichardt | | | | | | | | | | | | | | | | Marie Bach Hansen | Vicky Knudsen | Jannie Faurschou | | | | |
| Camilla Sofie Dalsgaard | | | | | | | | | | | | | | | | | | Jacob Haugaard | Jakob Åkerlind | Andreas Bo | Phillip May | Alfred Midé Erichsen |
| Damian Czarnecki | | | | | | | | | | | | | | | | | | | Cecilie Schmeichel | Barbara Moleko | Sara Lygum | Pusle Helmuth |
| Eugen Miu | | | | | | | | | | | | | | | | | | | Andrea Lykke Oehlenschlæger | | Anna Munch | Sissal/Julie Rudbæk |
| Nikolaj Lund | | | | | | | | | | | | | | | | | | | | | Dot Wessman | |

== Season 1 (Spring 2005) ==
The first season of Vild med dans ("Mad about Dancing") was aired on the Danish TV-channel TV 2 in 2005 and the contestants were:

| Celebrity | Notability | Professional partner | Status |
|---|---|---|---|
| Sofie Stougaard | Actress | Tobias Karlsson | Eliminated 1st |
| Marianne Florman | Handball player | René Christensen | Eliminated 2nd |
| Stine Stengade | Actress | Lars Christensen | Eliminated 3rd |
| Jesper Skibby | Cyclist | Julia Petrovic | Eliminated 4th |
| Klaus Bondam | Politician and actor | Soffie Dalsgaard | Eliminated 5th |
| Erik Peitersen | TV workman | Marianne Eihilt | Runner-up |
| Mia Lyhne | Actress | Thomas Evers Poulsen | Winners |

== Season 2 (Autumn 2005) ==
| Celebrity | Notability | Professional partner | Status |
|---|---|---|---|
| Mayianne Dinesen | TV Personality | Lars Christensen | Eliminated 1st |
| Allan Olsen | Actor | Sofie Dalsgaard | Eliminated 2nd |
| Kim Milton Nielsen | Football Referee | Ann Wilson | Eliminated 3rd |
| Bettina Aller | Magazine Editor | René Christensen | Eliminated 4th |
| Zindy Laursen | Singer | Tobias Karlsson | Eliminated 5th |
| Peter Mygind | Actor | Mie Moltke | Eliminated 6th |
| Sisse Fisker | TV-Hostess | Steen Lund | Eliminated 7th |
| Eskild Ebbesen | Olympic-Winning Oarsman | Marianne Eihilt | Runner-up |
| David Owe | Actor | Vickie Jo Ringgaard | Winners |

== Season 3 (2006) ==
| Celebrity | Notability | Professional partner | Status |
|---|---|---|---|
| Lærke Winther Andersen | Actress | Klaus Kongsdal | Eliminated 1st |
| Gert Bo Jacobsen | Boxer | Vickie Jo Ringgaard | Eliminated 2nd |
| Liv Corfixen | Actress | Mads Vad | Eliminated 3rd |
| Annette Heick | Singer and TV hostess | Thomas Evers Poulsen | Eliminated 4th |
| Master Fatman | Entertainer | Mie Moltke | Eliminated 5th |
| Ole Olsen | Speedway Racer | Marianne Eihilt | Eliminated 6th |
| Anna David | Singer | René Christensen | Eliminated 7th |
| Nikolaj Christensen | Singer | Soffie Dalsgaard | 3rd place |
| Simon Mathew | Singer | Viktoria Franova | Runner-up |
| Christina Roslyng | Olympic-Winning Handballplayer | Steen Lund | Winners |

== Season 4 (2007) ==
The fourth season ended 16 November 2007.

| Celebrity | Notability | Professional partner | Status |
|---|---|---|---|
| Benedikte Hansen | Actress | Bo Loft Jensen | Eliminated 1st |
| Nicolai Moltke-Leth | Military man | Soffie Dalsgaard | Eliminated 2nd |
| Paula Larrain | TV-hostess | René Christensen | Eliminated 3rd |
| Joachim Boldsen | Handball Player | Vickie Jo Ringgaard | Withdrew |
| Anne Louise Hassing | Actress | Michael Olesen | Eliminated 4th |
| Said Chayesteh | Actor | Mette Georgio | Eliminated 5th |
| Lisbeth Østergård | TV-hostess | Thomas Evers Poulsen | Eliminated 6th |
| Lai Yde | Actor | Mie Moltke | Eliminated 7th |
| Rikke Hørlykke | Olympic-Winning Handballplayer | Mads Vad | Eliminated 8th |
| Vicki Berlin | Comedian & Actress | Steen Lund/Jesper Dalsgaard | Runner-up |
| Robert Hansen | Actor | Marianne Eihilt | Winners |

=== Scoring chart ===
| Couple | Place | 1/2 | 3 | 4 | 5 | 6 | 5+6 | 7 | 8 | 9 | 10 | 11 |
|---|---|---|---|---|---|---|---|---|---|---|---|---|
| Robert & Marianne | 1 | 24 | 23 | 26 | 35 | 33 | 68 | 33 | 34+33=67 | 38+39=77 | 40+40=80 | 40+39+40=119 |
| Vicki & Steen | 2 | 28 | 23 | 32 | 29 | 32 | 61 | 36 | 40+36=76 | 37+38=75 | 40+39=79 | 40+39+40=119 |
| Rikke & Mads | 3 | 23 | 23 | 24 | 32 | 29 | 61 | 35 | 38+36=74 | 31+33=64 | 36+40=76 | |
| Lai & Mie | 4 | 27 | 27 | 31 | 29 | 29 | 58 | 32 | 36+35=71 | 37+37=74 | | |
| Lisbeth & Thomas | 5 | 24 | 26 | 30 | 25 | 28 | 53 | 34 | 32+34=66 | | | |
| Said & Mette | 6 | 22 | 16 | 24 | 28 | 28 | 56 | 28 | | | | |
| Anne Louise & Michael | 7 | 24 | 18 | 26 | 25 | 28 | 53 | | | | | |
| Joachim & Vickie Jo | 8 | 23 | 24 | 23 | — | | | | | | | |
| Paula & René | 9 | 24 | 18 | 27 | | | | | | | | |
| Nicolai & Soffie | 10 | 25 | 18 | | | | | | | | | |
| Benedikte & Bo | 11 | 21 | | | | | | | | | | |

Red numbers indicate the lowest score for each week
Green numbers indicate the highest score for each week
indicates the couple eliminated that week
indicates the returning couple that finished in the bottom two
indicates the winning couple
indicates the runner-up couple
indicates the third-place couple

== Christmas Gala 2007 ==
| Celebrity | Professional partner | Status |
|---|---|---|
| Master Fatman | Mie Moltke | Eliminated |
| Robert Hansen | Marianne Eihilt | Eliminated |
| Christina Roslyng | Steen Lund | Eliminated |
| Mia Lyhne | Thomas Evers Poulsen | Eliminated |
| David Owe | Vickie Jo Ringgaard | Eliminated |
| Simon Mathew | Viktoria Franova | Winners |

== Season 5 (2008) ==
| Celebrity | Profession | Professional partner | Status |
|---|---|---|---|
| Oliver Bjerrehuus | Model | Viktoria Franova | Eliminated 1st |
| Jette Torp | Singer | Mads Vad | Eliminated 2nd |
| Søren Bregendal | Singer & Actor | Ashli Williamson | Eliminated 3rd |
| Kenneth Carlsen | Tennis Player | Katrine Bonde | Eliminated 4th |
| Szhirley | Singer | Silas Holst | Eliminated 5th |
| Hans Pilgaard | TV Host | Mie Moltke | Eliminated 6th |
| Anne-Mette Rasmussen | Prime Minister's Wife | Thomas Evers Poulsen | Eliminated 7th |
| Anne-Grethe Bjarup Riis | Actress | Michael Olesen | Eliminated 8th |
| Tina Lund | Rider | Tobias Karlsson | Runner-up |
| Joachim B. Olsen | Shot Putter | Marianne Eihilt | Winners |

=== Scoring chart ===
| Couple | Place | 1/2 | 3 | 4 | 5 | 6 | 7 | 8 | 9 | 10 |
|---|---|---|---|---|---|---|---|---|---|---|
| Joachim & Marianne | 1 | 24 | 27 | 22 | 33 | 33 | 29+32=61 | 34+36=70 | 40+39=79 | 40+40+40=120 |
| Tina & Tobias | 2 | 17 | 17 | 21 | 23 | 31 | 28+28=56 | 38+33=71 | 37+36=73 | 38+40+40=118 |
| Anne-Grethe & Michael | 3 | 20 | 20 | 26 | 25 | 34 | 30+29=59 | 35+37=72 | 38+38=76 | |
| Anne-Mette & Thomas | 4 | 15 | 19 | 24 | 23 | 28 | 25+27=52 | 32+33=65 | | |
| Hans & Mie | 5 | 15 | 16 | 18 | 22 | 24 | 26+24=50 | | | |
| Szhirley & Silas | 6 | 16 | 21 | 24 | 32 | 30 | | | | |
| Kenneth & Katrine | 7 | 15 | 17 | 16 | 24 | | | | | |
| Søren & Ashli | 8 | 18 | 22 | 21 | | | | | | |
| Jette & Mads | 9 | 17 | 17 | | | | | | | |
| Oliver & Viktoria | 10 | 14 | | | | | | | | |

Red numbers indicate the lowest score for each week
Green numbers indicate the highest score for each week
indicates the couple eliminated that week
indicates the returning couple that finished in the bottom two
indicates the winning couple
indicates the runner-up couple
indicates the third-place couple

== Season 6 (2009) ==
| Celebrity | Profession | Professional partner | Status |
|---|---|---|---|
| Sven-Ole Thorsen | Karate Master | Mie Moltke | Eliminated 1st |
| Basim | Singer | Claudia Rex | Eliminated 2nd |
| Line Baun Danielsen | TV Hostess | Morten Kjeldgaard | Eliminated 3rd |
| Noam Halby | Singer | Katrine Bonde | Eliminated 4th |
| René Dif | Singer | Luise Crone Dons | Eliminated 5th |
| Lotte Friis | Swimmer | Mads Vad | Eliminated 6th |
| Lisa Lents | Miss Denmark 2008 | Michael Olesen | Eliminated 7th |
| Pernille Højmark | Actress & Singer | Thomas Evers Poulsen | Eliminated 8th |
| Malena Belafonte | Model | Silas Holst | Runner-up |
| Casper Elgaard | Rally Driver | Vickie Jo Ringgaard | Winners |

=== Scoring chart ===
| Couple | Place | 1 | 2 | 1+2 | 3 | 4 | 5 | 6 | 7 | 8 | 9 | 10 |
|---|---|---|---|---|---|---|---|---|---|---|---|---|
| Casper & Vickie Jo | 1 | 17 | 23 | 40 | 30 | 24 | 27+27=54 | 34 | 36+35=71 | 32+32=64 | 37+35=72 | 40+40+40=120 |
| Malena & Silas | 2 | 17 | 23 | 40 | 21 | 30 | 32+31=63 | 32 | 36+35=71 | 35+32=67 | 36+40=76 | 40+40+40=120 |
| Pernille & Thomas | 3 | 17 | 17 | 34 | 21 | 32 | 26+27=53 | 33 | 32+35=67 | 35+32=67 | 37+35=72 | |
| Lisa & Michael | 4 | 22 | 31 | 53 | 31 | 27 | 33+32=65 | 32 | 36+35=71 | 35+32=67 | | |
| Lotte & Mads | 5 | 17 | 16 | 33 | 16 | 21 | 27+25=52 | 29 | 33+35=68 | | | |
| René & Luise | 6 | 18 | 21 | 39 | 23 | 28 | 28+24=52 | 25 | | | | |
| Noam & Katrine | 7 | 15 | 27 | 42 | 23 | 30 | 24+22=46 | | | | | |
| Line & Morten | 8 | 15 | 24 | 39 | 23 | 25 | | | | | | |
| Basim & Claudia | 9 | 9 | 22 | 31 | 17 | | | | | | | |
| Sven-Ole & Mie | 10 | 16 | 15 | 31 | | | | | | | | |

Red numbers indicate the lowest score for each week
Green numbers indicate the highest score for each week
indicates the couple eliminated that week
indicates the returning couple that finished in the bottom two
indicates the winning couple
indicates the runner-up couple
indicates the third-place couple

== Season 7 (2010) ==
| Celebrity | Profession | Professional partner | Status |
|---|---|---|---|
| Kurt Thyboe | Sport Commentator | Karina Frimodt | Eliminated 1st |
| Anne Kejser | TV Hostess | Martin Wardinghus Glerup | Eliminated 2nd |
| Kristian Jensen | Politician | Katrine Bonde | Eliminated 3rd |
| Allan Nielsen | Football Player | Vickie Jo Ringgaard | Eliminated 4th |
| Dicte | Singer | Michael Olesen | Eliminated 5th |
| Michael Rasmussen | Cyclist | Mie Moltke | Eliminated 6th |
| Patrik Wozniacki | Football Player | Claudia Rex | Eliminated 7th |
| Christina Hembo | Jewelry Designer | Thomas Evers Poulsen | Eliminated 8th |
| Laura Drasbæk | Actress | Silas Holst | Runner-up |
| Cecilie Hother | TV Hostess | Mads Vad | Winners |

== Season 8 (2011) ==
| Celebrity | Profession | Professional partner | Status |
|---|---|---|---|
| Eva Nabe Poulsen | TV Hostess | Anders Jacobson | Eliminated 1st |
| Thomas Voss | Actor | Julie Westergaard | Eliminated 2nd |
| Al Agami | Rapper | Tine Dahl | Eliminated 3rd |
| Hella Joof | Actress | Tobias Karlsson | Eliminated 4th |
| Pia Allerslev | Politician | Michael Olesen | Eliminated 5th |
| Ole Kibsgaard | Musician | Karina Frimodt | Eliminated 6th |
| Kaya Brüel | Singer | Steen Lund | Eliminated 7th |
| Anne Sofie Espersen | Actress | Mads Vad | Eliminated 8th |
| Nicolaj Kopernikus | Actor | Viktoria Franova | Eliminated 9th |
| Tommy Kenter | Actor | Marianne Eihilt | Eliminated 10th |
| Patrick Nielsen | Boxer | Claudia Rex | Runner-up |
| Sophie Fjellvang-Sølling | Skier | Silas Holst | Winners |

=== Scoring chart ===
| Couple | Place | 1/2 | 3 | 4 | 5 | 6 | 7 | 8 | 9 | 10 | 11 | 12 |
|---|---|---|---|---|---|---|---|---|---|---|---|---|
| Sophie & Silas | 1 | 23 | 26 | 32 | 31 | 37 | 31 | 30+4=34 | 33+4=37 | 32+35=67 | 33+40=73 | 39+38+40=117 |
| Patrick & Claudia | 2 | 9 | 23 | 21 | 28 | 27 | 34 | 32+5=37 | 29+3=32 | 38+32=70 | 37+40=77 | 37+37+39=113 |
| Tommy & Marianne | 3 | 18 | 29 | 26 | 28 | 30 | 31 | 23+2=25 | 33+2=35 | 30+35=65 | 37+36=73 | |
| Nicolaj & Viktoria | 4 | 16 | 25 | 25 | 33 | 35 | 33 | 25+3=28 | 28+1=29 | 28+32=60 | | |
| Anne Sofie & Mads | 5 | 25 | 20 | 28 | 26 | 18 | 39 | 28+6=34 | 33+5=38 | | | |
| Kaya & Steen | 6 | 21 | 15 | 28 | 24 | 28 | 31 | 24+1=25 | | | | |
| Ole & Karina | 7 | 13 | 19 | 24 | 26 | 22 | 21 | | | | | |
| Pia & Michael | 8 | 12 | 15 | 13 | 19 | 16 | | | | | | |
| Hella & Tobias | 9 | 18 | 16 | 15 | 22 | | | | | | | |
| Al & Tine | 10 | 10 | 17 | 12 | | | | | | | | |
| Thomas & Julie | 11 | 23 | 13 | | | | | | | | | |
| Eva & Anders | 12 | 10 | | | | | | | | | | |

Red numbers indicate the lowest score for each week
Green numbers indicate the highest score for each week
indicates the couple eliminated that week
indicates the returning couple that finished in the bottom two
indicates the winning couple
indicates the runner-up couple
indicates the third-place couple

== Season 9 (2012) ==
| Participants | Occupation | Professional partner | Status |
|---|---|---|---|
| Lars Rasmussen | Handballer | Malene Østergaard | Eliminated 1st |
| Monica Christiansen | Golfer | Thomas Evers Poulsen | Eliminated 2nd |
| Anders Krogh Jørgensen | Boxer | Mie Moltke | Eliminated 3rd |
| Saseline Sørensen | Singer | Ronnie Handskemager | Eliminated 4th |
| Rasmus Nøhr | Singer | Karina Frimodt | Eliminated 5th |
| Jeanette Ottesen Gray | Swimmer | Marc Christensen | Eliminated 6th |
| Camilla Bendix | actress | Michael Olesen | Eliminated 7th |
| Louise Spellerberg | Handballer | Mads Vad | Eliminated 8th |
| Louise Mieritz | actress | Silas Holst | Runner-up |
| Joakim Ingversen | TV-presenter | Claudia Rex | Winners |

=== Scoring chart ===
| Couple | Place | 1/2 | 3 | 4 | 5 | 6 | 7 | 8 | 9 | 10 |
|---|---|---|---|---|---|---|---|---|---|---|
| Joakim & Claudia | 1 | 14 | 23 | 26 | 19 | 26+28=54 | 28+1=29 | 37+38=75 | 38+40=78 | 36+40+40=116 |
| Louise M. & Silas | 2 | 19 | 26 | 28 | 28 | 32+32=64 | 30+5=35 | 25+38=63 | 40+38=78 | 38+38+40=116 |
| Louise S. & Mads | 3 | 15 | 23 | 25 | 22 | 24+28=52 | 20+3=23 | 33+32=65 | 34+33=67 | |
| Camilla & Michael | 4 | 15 | 27 | 20 | 25 | 24+32=56 | 28+2=30 | 26+32=58 | | |
| Jeanette & Marc | 5 | 11 | 24 | 21 | 21 | 22+28=50 | 26+4=30 | | | |
| Rasmus & Karina | 6 | 8 | 16 | 16 | 16 | 16+32=48 | | | | |
| Saseline & Ronnie | 7 | 10 | 18 | 22 | 14 | | | | | |
| Anders & Mie | 8 | 7 | 12 | 17 | | | | | | |
| Monica & Thomas | 9 | 13 | 14 | | | | | | | |
| Lars & Malene | 10 | 9 | | | | | | | | |

Red numbers indicate the lowest score for each week
Green numbers indicate the highest score for each week
indicates the couple eliminated that week
indicates the returning couple that finished in the bottom two
indicates the winning couple
indicates the runner-up couple
indicates the third-place couple

== Season 10 (2013) ==
| Participants | Occupation | Professional partner | Status |
|---|---|---|---|
| Le Gammeltoft | DJ | Frederik Nonnemann | Eliminated 1st |
| Claes Bang | actor | Katrine Bonde | Withdrew |
| Maria Lucia Rosenberg | Singer | Morten Kjeldgaard | Eliminated 2nd |
| Mattias Hundebøll | Musician | Mie Moltke | Eliminated 3rd |
| Charlotte Fich | actress | Marc Christensen | Eliminated 4th |
| Thomas Ernst | actor | Malene Østergaard | Eliminated 5th |
| Mette Blomsterberg | Confectioner | Michael Olesen | Eliminated 6th |
| Mathilde Norholt | actress | Thomas Evers Poulsen | Eliminated 7th |
| Mads Laudrup | Footballer | Claudia Rex | Eliminated 8th |
| Allan Simonsen | Footballer | Sofie Kruuse | Eliminated 9th |
| Uffe Holm | comedian | Karina Frimodt | Runner-up |
| Mie Skov | Table tennis player | Mads Vad | Winners |

=== Scoring chart ===
| Couple | Place | 1/2 | 3 | 4 | 5 | 6 | 7 | 8 | 7+8 | 9 | 10 | 11 | 12 |
|---|---|---|---|---|---|---|---|---|---|---|---|---|---|
| Mie & Mads | 1 | 16 | 12 | 17 | 30 | 37 | 33 | 29+36=65 | 98 | 32+4=36 | 36+35=71 | 37+40=77 | 36+40+40=116 |
| Uffe & Karina | 2 | 15 | 14 | 20 | 26 | 28 | 26 | 32+33=65 | 91 | 28+5=33 | 37+38=75 | 36+38=74 | 36+40+40=116 |
| Allan & Sofie | 3 | 5 | 4 | 7 | 8 | 12 | 11 | 11+33=44 | 55 | 12+1=13 | 13+21=34 | 18+21=39 | |
| Mads & Claudia | 4 | 13 | 20 | 21 | 26 | 26 | 33 | 31+36=67 | 100 | 30+2=32 | 33+33=66 | | |
| Mathilde & Thomas | 5 | 15 | 11 | 27 | 26 | 25 | 28 | 26+36=62 | 90 | 31+3=34 | | | |
| Mette & Michael | 6 | 11 | 19 | 19 | 28 | 30 | 32 | 24+33=57 | 89 | | | | |
| Thomas & Malene | 7 | 18 | 10 | 16 | 16 | 22 | | | | | | | |
| Charlotte & Marc | 8 | 14 | 24 | 22 | 20 | | | | | | | | |
| Mattias & Mie | 9 | 12 | 20 | 17 | | | | | | | | | |
| Maria Lucia & Morten | 10 | 23 | 13 | | | | | | | | | | |
| Claes & Katrine | 11 | 6 | — | | | | | | | | | | |
| Le & Frederik | 12 | 7 | | | | | | | | | | | |

Red numbers indicate the lowest score for each week
Green numbers indicate the highest score for each week
indicates the couple eliminated that week
indicates the returning couple that finished in the bottom two
indicates the winning couple
indicates the runner-up couple
indicates the third-place couple

== Season 11 (2014) ==
| Participants | Occupation | Professional partner | Status |
|---|---|---|---|
| Thomas Wivel | Comedian | Katrine Bonde | Eliminated 1st |
| Erik Brandt | Fashion designer | Vivi Siggard | Eliminated 2nd |
| Uso | Rapper | Jenna Bagge | Eliminated 3rd |
| Tine Baun | Badminton player | Frederik Nonnemann | Eliminated 4th |
| Besir Zechiri | actor | Mie Moltke | Withdrew |
| Line Kruse | actress | Michael Olesen | Eliminated 5th |
| Helge Vammen | Olympic gymnast | Sofie Kruuse | Eliminated 6th |
| Paprika Steen | actress | Mads Vad | Eliminated 7th |
| Ditte Ylva Olsen | actress | Morten Kjeldgaard | Eliminated 8th |
| Astrid Krag | Politician | Thomas Evers Poulsen | Eliminated 9th |
| Johannes Nymark | actor & singer | Claudia Rex | Runner-up |
| Sara Maria Franch-Mærkedahl | TV Hostess & Model | Silas Holst | Winners |

=== Scoring chart ===
| Couple | Place | 1/2 | 3 | 4 | 5 | 6 | 7 | 8 | 7+8 | 9 | 10 | 11 | 12 |
|---|---|---|---|---|---|---|---|---|---|---|---|---|---|
| Sara Maria & Silas | 1 | 18 | 23 | 18 | 33 | 25 | 28 | 36+33=69 | 97 | 35+4=39 | 37+38=75 | 38+40=78 | 40+36+40=116 |
| Johannes & Claudia | 2 | 15 | 21 | 24 | 28 | 19 | 33 | 32+33=65 | 98 | 37+5=42 | 32+37=69 | 40+40=80 | 36+40+38=114 |
| Astrid & Thomas | 3 | 10 | 12 | 16 | 21 | 14 | 18 | 19+33=52 | 70 | 28+2=30 | 30+32=62 | 32+36=68 | |
| Ditte & Morten | 4 | 12 | 19 | 17 | 26 | 18 | 23 | 19+33=52 | 75 | 31+3=34 | 29+33=62 | | |
| Paprika & Mads | 5 | 17 | 14 | 18 | 21 | 20 | 24 | 21+33=54 | 78 | 26+1=27 | | | |
| Helge & Sofie | 6 | 8 | 10 | 11 | 14 | 8 | 12 | 12+33=45 | 57 | | | | |
| Line & Michael | 7 | 11 | 18 | 18 | 27 | 19 | | | | | | | |
| Besir & Mie | 8 | 15 | 18 | 15 | 24 | — | | | | | | | |
| Tine & Frederik | 9 | 8 | 14 | 14 | 14 | | | | | | | | |
| USO & Jenna | 10 | 13 | 13 | 13 | | | | | | | | | |
| Erik & Vivi | 11 | 6 | 9 | | | | | | | | | | |
| Thomas & Katrine | 12 | 9 | | | | | | | | | | | |

Red numbers indicate the lowest score for each week
Green numbers indicate the highest score for each week
indicates the couple eliminated that week
indicates the returning couple that finished in the bottom two
indicates the winning couple
indicates the runner-up couple
indicates the third-place couple

== Season 12 (2015) ==
| Celebrity | Profession | Professional partner | Status |
|---|---|---|---|
| Sami Darr | Actor | Patricia Tjørnelund | Eliminated 1st |
| Rasmus Jarlov | Politician | Mille Funk | Eliminated 2nd |
| Katrine Fruelund | Handballer | Aslak Amtrup | Eliminated 3rd |
| Chris Christoffersen | Basketballer | Luise Crone Dons | Eliminated 4th |
| Sharin Foo | Singer | Frederik Nonnemann | Eliminated 5th |
| Karen Mukupa | Singer | Michael Olesen | Eliminated 6th |
| Patrick Berdino | Circus artist | Jenna Bagge | Eliminated 7th |
| James Sampson | Singer | Mie Moltke | Eliminated 8th |
| Søs Egelind | Actress | Mads Vad | Eliminated 9th |
| John Faxe Jensen | Footballer | Karina Frimodt | Eliminated 10th |
| Stephania Potalivo | Actress & former child star | Morten Kjeldgaard | Runner-up |
| Ena Spottag | Actress | Thomas Evers Poulsen | Winners |

== Season 13 (2016) ==
| Celebrity | Profession | Professional partner | Status |
|---|---|---|---|
| Nicholas Nybro | Fashion Designer | Luise Crone Dons | Eliminated 1st |
| Patrick Jørgensen | Fencer | Jenna Bagge | Eliminated 2nd |
| Søren Fauli | Actor | Karina Frimodt | Eliminated 3rd |
| Gorm Wisweh | Chef | Sofie Kruuse | Eliminated 4th |
| Kirsten Siggaard | Singer | Thomas Evers Poulsen | Eliminated 5th |
| Julie Berthelsen | Singer | Marc Mariboe Christensen | Eliminated 6th |
| Lene Beier | TV Hostess | Frederik Nonnemann | Eliminated 7th |
| Mathias Käki Jørgensen | Actor | Mille Funk | Eliminated 8th |
| Thomas Buttenschøn | Singer | Mie Martha Moltke | Eliminated 9th |
| Laura Bach | Actress | Michael Olesen | Eliminated 10th |
| Mille Dinesen | Actress | Mads Vad | Runner-up |
| Sarah Mahfoud | Boxer | Morten Kjeldgaard | Winners |

=== Scoring chart ===
| Couple | Place | 1/2 | 3 | 4 | 5 | 6 | 7 | 8 | 9 | 10 | 11 | 12 |
|---|---|---|---|---|---|---|---|---|---|---|---|---|
| Sarah & Morten | 1 | 20 | 18 | 26 | 25 | 28 | 33 | 36 | 36+4=40 | 37+32=69 | 39+40+39=118 | 40+40+40=120 |
| Mille & Mads | 2 | 19 | 16 | 21 | 26 | 24 | 33 | 33 | 33+5=38 | 37+36=73 | 34+37+37=108 | 36+40+40=116 |
| Laura & Michael | 3 | 19 | 17 | 23 | 22 | 23 | 29 | 34 | 34+2=36 | 36+32=68 | 35+37+38=110 | |
| Thomas & Mie | 4 | 16 | 9 | 19 | 21 | 21 | 23 | 29 | 31+1=32 | 33+36=69 | | |
| Mathias & Mille | 5 | 16 | 12 | 17 | 17 | 21 | 24 | 30 | 29+3=32 | | | |
| Lene & Frederik | 6 | 9 | 11 | 11 | 14 | 15 | 19 | 21 | | | | |
| Julie & Marc | 7 | 12 | 18 | 17 | 20 | 24 | 20 | | | | | |
| Kirsten & Thomas | 8 | 12 | 12 | 12 | 18 | 17 | | | | | | |
| Gorm & Sofie | 9 | 14 | 8 | 16 | 16 | | | | | | | |
| Søren & Karina | 10 | 13 | 12 | 13 | | | | | | | | |
| Patrick & Jenna | 11 | 13 | 9 | | | | | | | | | |
| Nicholas & Luise | 12 | 13 | | | | | | | | | | |

Red numbers indicate the lowest score for each week
Green numbers indicate the highest score for each week
indicates the couple eliminated that week
indicates the returning couple that finished in the bottom two
indicates the winning couple
indicates the runner-up couple
indicates the third-place couple

== Season 14 (2017) ==
| Celebrity | Profession | Professional partner | Status |
|---|---|---|---|
| Christian Bækgaard | TV host | Mille Funk | Eliminated 1st |
| Ane Høgsberg | Comedienne | Esbern Syhler Hansen | Eliminated 2nd |
| Lucas Hansen | Actor | Sofie Kruuse | Eliminated 3rd |
| Jokeren | Rapper | Mie Martha Moltke | Eliminated 4th |
| Simon Jul | Comedian | Claudia Rex | Eliminated 5th |
| René Holten Poulsen | Canoeist | Jenna Bagge | Eliminated 6th |
| Mie Ø. Nielsen | Swimmer | Mads Vad | Eliminated 7th |
| Julia Sofia Aastrup | Influencer | Frederik Nonnemann | Eliminated 8th |
| Dak Wichangoen | Chef | Thomas Evers Poulsen | Eliminated 9th |
| Daniel Svensson | Handballer | Karina Frimodt | Eliminated 10th |
| Iben Hjejle | Actress | Morten Kjeldgaard | Runner-up |
| Sofie Lassen-Kahlke | Actress | Michael Olesen | Winners |

== Season 15 (2018) ==
| Celebrity | Profession | Professional partner | Status |
|---|---|---|---|
| Emil Thorup | TV Host | Jenna Bagge | Eliminated 1st |
| Adam Duvå Hall | TV Host | Mie Martha Moltke | Eliminated 2nd |
| Rosa Kildahl Christensen | TV Personality | Esbern Syhler Hansen | Eliminated 3rd |
| Lars Christiansen | Handballer | Sofie Kruuse | Eliminated 4th |
| Emmelie de Forest | Singer | Frederik Nonnemann | Eliminated 5th |
| Laila Friis-Salling | Skier | Morten Kjeldgaard | Eliminated 6th |
| Rolf Sørensen | Biker | Karina Frimodt | Withdrew |
| Signe Lindkvist | TV Hostess | Thomas Evers Poulsen | Eliminated 7th |
| Lucy Love | Rapper | Michael Olesen | Eliminated 8th |
| Esben Dalgaard Andersen | Actor | Mille Funk | Eliminated 9th |
| Molly Egelind | Actress | Mads Vad | Runner-up |
| Simon Stenspil | Actor | Asta Björk Ivarsdottir | Winners |

=== Scoring chart ===
| Couple | Place | 1 | 2 | 1+2 | 3 | 4 | 5 | 6 | 7 | 8 | 9 | 8+9 | 10 | 11 | 12 |
|---|---|---|---|---|---|---|---|---|---|---|---|---|---|---|---|
| Simon & Asta | 1 | 17 | 10 | 27 | 25 | 22 | 26 | 20 | 20 | 25+34=61 | 30 | 91 | 36+4=40 | 35+40+2=77 | 36+38+40=114 |
| Molly & Mads | 2 | 20 | 17 | 37 | 22 | 21 | 25 | 31 | 32 | 33+35=68 | 37 | 105 | 40+3=43 | 39+40+3=82 | 36+40+40=116 |
| Esben & Mille | 3 | 16 | 19 | 35 | 18 | 18 | 19 | 20 | 24 | 29+35=64 | 31 | 95 | 37+2=39 | 34+36+1=71 | |
| Lucy & Michael | 4 | 13 | 8 | 21 | 16 | 19 | 19 | 19 | 23 | 18+35=53 | 28 | 81 | 35+1=36 | | |
| Signe & Thomas | 5 | 13 | 15 | 28 | 20 | 21 | 21 | 30 | 19 | 22+34=56 | 26 | 82 | | | |
| Rolf & Karina | 6 | 8 | 5 | 13 | 9 | 10 | 13 | 10 | 5 | 13+34=47 | — | | | | |
| Laila & Morten | 7 | 10 | 12 | 22 | 18 | 21 | 14 | 26 | 18 | | | | | | |
| Emmelie & Frederik | 8 | 11 | 12 | 23 | 17 | 16 | 12 | 17 | | | | | | | |
| Lars & Sofie | 9 | 6 | 9 | 15 | 8 | 10 | 8 | | | | | | | | |
| Rosa & Esbern | 10 | 8 | 9 | 17 | 12 | 16 | | | | | | | | | |
| Adam & Mie | 11 | 17 | 11 | 28 | 16 | | | | | | | | | | |
| Emil & Jenna | 12 | 10 | 10 | 20 | | | | | | | | | | | |

Red numbers indicate the lowest score for each week
Green numbers indicate the highest score for each week
indicates the couple eliminated that week
indicates the returning couple that finished in the bottom two
indicates the winning couple
indicates the runner-up couple
indicates the third-place couple

== Season 16 (2019) ==
| Celebrity | Profession | Professional partner | Status |
|---|---|---|---|
| Anne Dorte Michelsen | Singer | Marc Mariboe Christensen | Eliminated 1st |
| Marie Bach Hansen | Actress | Martin Parnov Reichardt | Eliminated 2nd |
| Christel Pixi | Confectioner | Thomas Evers Poulsen | Eliminated 3rd |
| Birgit Aaby | Businesswoman | Frederik Nonnemann | Eliminated 4th |
| Michael Maze | Tabletennis Player | Mie Martha Moltke | Eliminated 5th |
| Umut Sakarya | Chef | Jenna Bagge | Withdrew |
| Mikkel Kessler | Boxer | Mille Funk | Eliminated 6th |
| Neel Rønholt | Actress | Michael Olesen | Eliminated 7th |
| Oscar Bjerrehuus | Model | Asta Björk Ivarsdottir | Eliminated 8th |
| Christopher Læssø | Actor & TV Host | Karina Frimodt | 3rd place |
| Coco O. | Singer | Morten Kjeldgaard | Runner-up |
| Jakob Fauerby | Actor | Silas Holst | Winners |

== Season 17 (2020) ==
| Celebrity | Profession | Professional partner | Status |
|---|---|---|---|
| Lars Krogh Jeppesen | Handballer | Malene Østergaard | Eliminated 1st |
| Kristian Bech | TV-Host | Mille Funk | Eliminated 2nd |
| Vicky Knudsen | Biologist | Martin Parnov Reichardt | Eliminated 3rd |
| Faustix | DJ | Asta Björk Ivarsdottir | Eliminated 4th |
| Janus Nabil Bakrawi | Actor | Karina Frimodt | Withdrew |
| Wafande | Singer | Mie Martha Moltke | Eliminated 5th |
| Hilda Heick | Singer | Michael Olesen | Eliminated 6th |
| Sara Bro | TV-Hostess | Morten Kjeldgaard | Eliminated 7th |
| Emili Sindlev | Stylist & Model | Mads Vad | Eliminated 8th |
| Nukâka Coster-Waldau | Actress & Former Model | Silas Holst | 3rd place |
| Albert Rosin Harson | Actor | Jenna Bagge | Runner-up |
| Merete Mærkedahl | Actress | Thomas Evers Poulsen | Winners |

=== Scoring chart ===
| Couple | Place | 1 | 2 | 1+2 | 3 | 4 | 5 | 4+5 | 6 | 7 | 8 | 9 | 10 | 11 | 12 |
|---|---|---|---|---|---|---|---|---|---|---|---|---|---|---|---|
| Merete & Thomas | 1 | 19 | 25 | 44 | 26 | 31 | 37 | 68 | 35 | 45 | 47 | 47+41=88 | 45+4=49 | 50+49=99 | 50+50+49=149 |
| Albert & Jenna | 2 | 12 | 19 | 31 | 21 | 29 | 17 | 46 | 34 | 28 | 36 | 34+43=77 | 42+2=44 | 45+41=86 | 43+46+50=139 |
| Nukâka & Silas | 3 | 17 | 20 | 37 | 33 | 33 | 26 | 59 | — | 35 | 46 | 38+43=81 | 47+1=48 | 41+47=88 | 46+44+48=138 |
| Emili & Mads | 4 | 15 | 26 | 41 | 29 | 32 | 38 | 70 | 43 | 43 | 48 | 43+43=86 | 50+5=55 | 49+48=97 | |
| Sara & Morten | 5 | 17 | 20 | 37 | 20 | 32 | 28 | 60 | 33 | 35 | 39 | 39+41=80 | 44+3=47 | | |
| Hilda & Michael | 6 | 14 | 17 | 31 | 17 | 23 | 26 | 49 | 29 | 26 | 38 | 29+41=70 | | | |
| Wafande & Mie | 7 | 14 | 17 | 31 | 23 | 22 | 31 | 53 | 26 | 30 | 34 | | | | |
| Janus & Karina | 8 | 11 | 20 | 31 | 25 | 35 | 34 | 69 | — | 35 | — | | | | |
| Faustix & Asta | 9 | 10 | 11 | 21 | 22 | 18 | 18 | 36 | 31 | 27 | | | | | |
| Vicky & Martin | 10 | 5 | 11 | 16 | 10 | 16 | 16 | 32 | | | | | | | |
| Kristian & Mille | 11 | 15 | 19 | 34 | 18 | | | | | | | | | | |
| Lars & Malene | 12 | 13 | 12 | 25 | | | | | | | | | | | |

Red numbers indicate the lowest score for each week
Green numbers indicate the highest score for each week
indicates the couple eliminated that week
indicates the returning couple that finished in the bottom two
indicates the winning couple
indicates the runner-up couple
indicates the third-place couple

== Season 18 (2021) ==
| Celebrity | Profession | Professional partner | Status |
|---|---|---|---|
| Jannie Faurschou | Actress | Martin Parnov Reichardt | Eliminated 1st |
| Rasmus Kolbe | Influencer and Author | Mille Funk | Eliminated 2nd |
| Abdi Hakin Ulad | Olympic Athlete | Malene Østergaard | Eliminated 3rd |
| Jacob Haugaard | Actor | Camilla Dalsgaard | Eliminated 4th |
| Freja Kirk | Singer | Claudia Rex | Eliminated 5th |
| Michael Katz Krefeld | Author | Karina Frimodt | Eliminated 6th |
| Michelle Kristensen | Cooking Book Author | Mads Vad | Eliminated 7th |
| Mascha Vang | TV-Personality and Model | Thomas Evers Poulsen | Eliminated 8th |
| Micki Cheng | Baking-TV Star | Jenna Bagge | Eliminated 9th |
| Pernille Blume | Olympic Swimmer | Morten Kjeldgaard | 3rd place |
| Lise Rønne | TV-Hostess | Silas Holst | Runner-up |
| Jimilian | Singer | Asta Björk Ivarsdottir | Winners |

== Season 19 (2022) ==
| Celebrity | Profession | Professional partner | Status |
|---|---|---|---|
| Nicholas Kawamura | Radio Host | Karina Frimodt | Eliminated 1st |
| Andrea Lykke | Singer & Actress | Eugen Miu | Eliminated 2nd |
| Jakob Åkerlind | Actor | Camilla Dalsgaard | Eliminated 3rd |
| Heidi Frederikke Sigdal Rasmussen | TV Hostess | Michael Olesen | Eliminated 4th |
| Katerina Pitzner | Jewelry Designer | Morten Kjeldgaard | Eliminated 5th |
| Joel Hyrland | Actor & Comedian | Jenna Bagge | Eliminated 6th |
| Cecilie Schmeichel | TV-Personality & Daughter of Peter Schmeichel | Damian Czarnecki | Eliminated 7th |
| Natasha Brock | Comedienne | Thomas Evers Poulsen | 3rd place |
| Daniel Wagner Jørgensen | Paralympic Athlete | Asta Björk Ivarsdottir | Runner-up |
| Caspar Phillipson | Actor | Malene Østergaard | Winners |

== Season 20 (2023) ==
| Celebrity | Profession | Professional partner | Status |
|---|---|---|---|
| Dulfi Al-Jabouri | Actor | Malene Østergaard | Eliminated 1st |
| Barbara Moleko | Singer | Damian Czarnecki | Eliminated 2nd |
| Andreas Bo | Actor and Comedian | Camilla Dalsgaard | Eliminated 3rd |
| Katinka Lærke Petersen | Actress | Mads Vad | Eliminated 4th |
| Soeren Le Schmidt | Fashion Designer | Mie Moltke | Eliminated 5th |
| Sebastian Bull Sarning | Actor | Asta Björk Ivarsdottir | Eliminated 6th |
| Özlem Cekic | Debater and former politician | Thomas Evers Poulsen | Eliminated 7th |
| Mette Sommer | Bachelorette Contestant | Morten Kjeldgaard | 3rd place |
| Fredrik Trudslev | Actor and Influencer | Jenna Bagge | Runner-up |
| Kasper Fisker | Former Football player | Karina Frimodt | Winners |

== Season 21 (2024) ==
| Celebrity | Profession | Professional partner | Status |
|---|---|---|---|
| Dot Wessman | Singer | Nikolaj Lund | Eliminated 1st |
| Victor Gairy Aasmul | Olympic Kayaker | Mille Funk | Eliminated 2nd |
| Sara Lygum | TV-Hostess | Damian Czarnecki | Eliminated 3rd |
| Kamal Hassan | Radio Host | Mie Moltke | Eliminated 4th |
| May Lifschitz | Actress & Model | Mads Vad | Withdrew |
| Philip May | TV-Personality | Camilla Dalsgaard | Eliminated 5th |
| Rachel Ellebye | TV-Personality | Thomas Evers Poulsen | Eliminated 6th |
| Rasmus Staghøj | TV-Presenter & Journalist | Asta Björk Ivarsdottir | 3rd place |
| Morten Hemmingsen | Actor | Malene Østergaard | Runner-up |
| Anna Munch | Actress & Influencer | Eugen Miu | Winners |

== Season 22 (2025) ==
| Celebrity | Profession | Professional partner | Status |
|---|---|---|---|
| Peter Løvenkrands | Former Footballer | Jenna Harson | Eliminated 1st |
| Skinz | Singer | Mille Funk | Eliminated 2nd |
| Pusle Helmuth | Actress | Damian Czarnecki | Eliminated 3rd |
| Sissal | Singer | Eugen Miu | Eliminated 4th |
| Gustav Salinas | TV-Personality | Karina Frimodt | Eliminated 5th |
| Jesper Asholt | Actor | Asta Björk Ivarsdottir | Eliminated 6th |
| Julie Rudbæk | Actress | Morten Kjeldgaard/Eugen Miu | Eliminated 7th |
| Alfred Mide Erichsen | TV-Personality | Camilla Dalsgaard | 3rd place |
| Camilla Ottesen | TV-Hostess | Thomas Evers Poulsen | Runner-up |
| Jasmin Lind | Influencer | Michael Olesen | Winners |
