= Bellefonte =

Bellefonte may refer to:

== U.S. places ==
- Bellefonte, Alabama
- Bellefonte, Arkansas
- Bellefonte, Delaware
- Bellefonte, Kentucky
- Bellefonte, Pennsylvania

== Other uses ==
- The Bellefonte Nuclear Generating Station in Hollywood, Alabama, United States
- USCGC Bellefonte (WYP-373), a United States Coast Guard patrol vessel in commission from April to August 1944 which also was in commission in the United States Fish and Wildlife Service as the fisheries research ship US FWS Albatross III from 1948 to 1959

== See also ==
- Belafonte (disambiguation)
- Bellafonte, surname, including Belafonte
- Bellefont, Kansas
