= Lertchai Treetawatchaiwong =

Thai-Danish restaurateur (born 1978)

Lertchai Treetawatchaiwong (Thai: เลิศชัย ตรีธวัชชัยวงศ์; born 28 April 1978) is a Thai-Danish software engineer, restaurateur and entrepreneur. With his business and life partner, the Danish sommelier and chef Henrik Yde-Andersen, he has founded and operates a host of restaurants, mainly in Copenhagen, ranging from the Michelin-starred restaurant Kiin Kiin to gourmet take-aways.

== Biography ==
Treetawatchaiwong was born in Bangkok's Chinatown, an area centred on Yaowarat Road, into a family of Chinese origins. He studied to become an engineer and first arrived in Denmark as a trainee in 2000, originally with no intentions to stay. Shortly prior to his return to Thailand he applied for some jobs and when he was offered a job at Ericsson. In 2002, he moved on to work for Microsoft as a software engineer.

Treetawatchaiwong first met Yde-Andersen, who had just returned from a stay in Bangkok, through mutual friends in 2005. They developed plans to introduce Thai Haute cuisine to Copenhagen's gourmet restaurant scene, otherwise dominated by the New Nordic Cuisine movement spearheaded by Noma which opened in 2004. As part of their preparations, they visited all Michelin restaurants in Copenhagen as well as Asian top places in London. They first opened the take-away Aroii in Nørrebro but shortly after followed their main project, Kiin Kiin, which opened to excellent reviews in 2006 and received a rising star in the 2007 Michelin Guide. The following year Kiin Kiin was awarded a Michelin Star which it has kept since then. In 2008, the duo opened The Ricemarket, an Asian bistro, on Kultorvet in the city centre. 2009 saw them open a restaurant dedicated to the Cantonese Dim sum tradition which also lend it its name. It was originally planned to open in the Meatpacking District but after problems with approvals, it was instead located on Sankt Annæ Plads. In April 2010 Aroiidee was opened with a selection of Thai, Chinese, Vietnamese and Japanese dishes.
