= Belafonte (disambiguation) =

Harry Belafonte (1927–2023) was a Jamaican-American singer, actor and activist.

Belafonte may also refer to:

- Belafonte (album), second studio album by Harry Belafonte
- Bellafonte, surname, including Belafonte

== See also ==
- Bellefonte (disambiguation)
