= Sarah Grünewald =

Danish model, presenter, and actress born in Germany

- Born: Sarah Backhaus Grünewald; 5 February 1984 (age 42); Germany
- Occupations: Model; television presenter; actress
- Spouse: Rasmus Backhaus (m. 2014)
- Children: Luis (son)

Sarah Backhaus Grünewald (born 5 February 1984) is a Danish model, television presenter and actress.

== Biography ==
She was born in Germany, but was raised in Marielyst on Falster.

In 2013 Sarah Grünewald was chosen as Claus Elming's new member and replacement for Christiane Schaumburg-Müller in Season 10 of Vild med dans. She returned in Season 11.

She has participated in the television series Tomgang and in the films A Funny Man (2010) and Det andet liv (2014).

In 2014 she married boyfriend Rasmus Backhaus. Their son, Luis, was born in March 2016.
