= Maddysten =

Maddysten is a Danish TV show broadcast by DR.

First season premiered on DR1 13 March 2019. The second season premiered on DR1 4 March 2020

In first season the hosts/judges were Dak Wichangoen, Timm Vladimir, and Louisa Lorang. In second season Timm was replaced by Gorm Wisweh.
