= Wozniacki =

Wozniacki or Woźniacki (Polish pronunciation: [vɔʑˈɲatski]; feminine: Woźniacka, plural: Woźniaccy) is a Polish-language surname related to Woźniak. Notable people with the surname include:

- Caroline Wozniacki (born 1990), Danish tennis player
- Patrik Wozniacki (born 1986), Danish footballer, brother of Caroline
