= Tobias Karlsson (dancer) =

Swedish dancer and choreographer

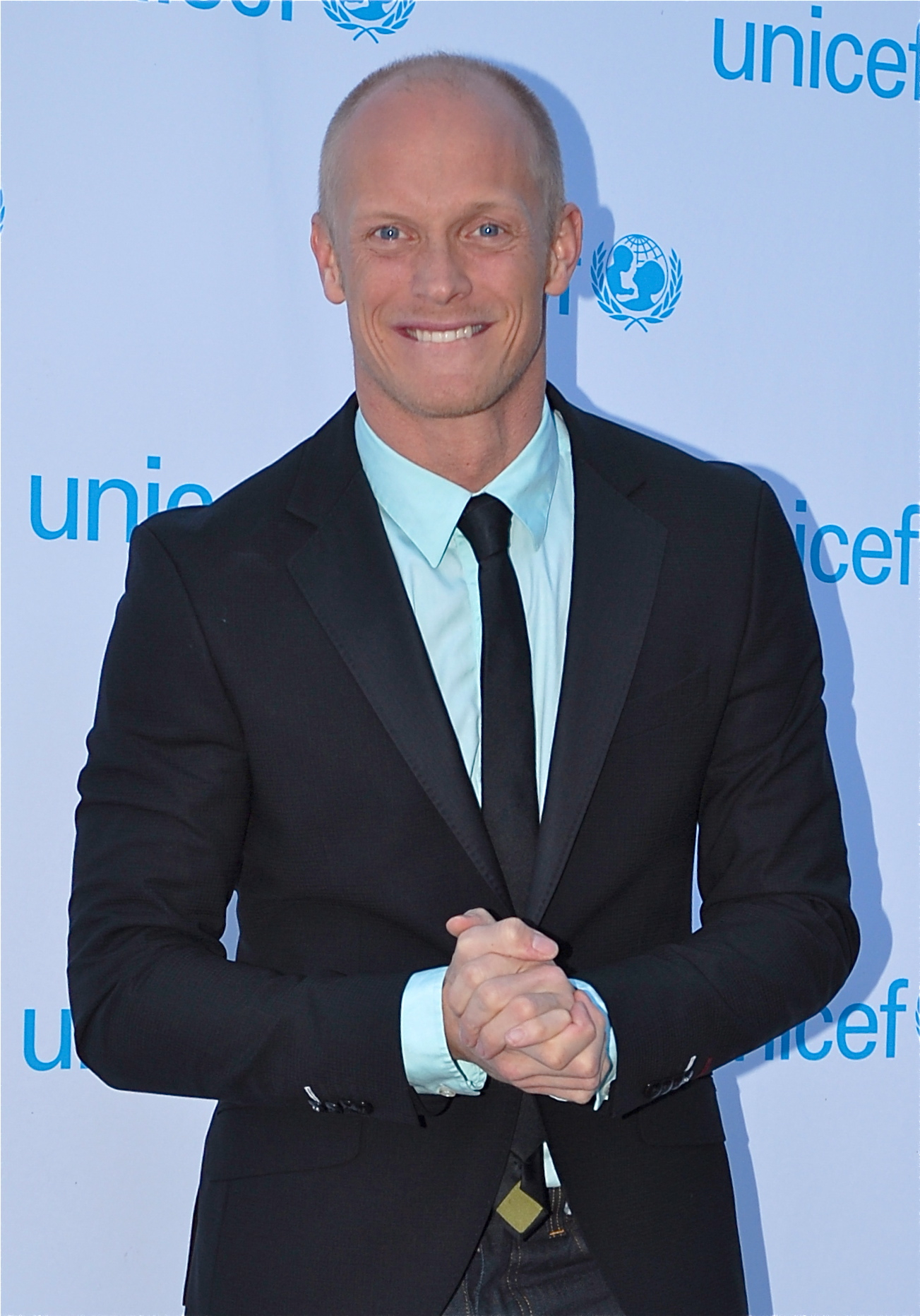
- Tobias Karlsson (2012)
- Born: 15 May 1977 (age 48); Östansjö, Sweden
- Occupation: Dancer
- Known for: Let's Dance

Erik Tobias Karlsson, (born 15 May 1977) is a Swedish competitive dancer and choreographer. Karlsson has been dancing since the age of eight, and has been a professional dancer and choreographer, mainly in ballroom dancing, since 1999. He has participated in several seasons of the TV4 celebrity dance show Let's Dance, where he won the third season dancing with Tina Nordström. He has also danced with Arja Saijonmaa, Anna Sahlin, Elisabet Höglund, Agneta Sjödin Tina Thörner, Camilla Henemark, and Anette Norberg. He has participated in fourteen seasons overall of the celebrity dance show both in Sweden and the Danish version Vild med dans, where he has danced with Sofie Stougaard, Zindy Laursen, Tina Lund and Hella Joof. He has also danced in the Norwegian version Skal vi danse with celebrities Triana Iglesias and Cecilie Skog.

In 2008, Karlsson participated in the dance show So You Think You Can Dance Scandinavia which was broadcast on Kanal5, he has also participated in Fort Boyard both in the Swedish and Danish version in 2010 and 2013. He also worked as a judge on the show Talang Sverige 2014 which was broadcast on TV3.
