= Lykkehjulet =

- Created by: Merv Griffin
- Presented by: Michael Meyerheim; Bengt Burg; Keld Heick; Lars Herlow
- Starring: Pia Dresner; Carina Jensen; Maria Hirse
- Country of origin: Denmark
- No. of episodes: 3,559

Production
- Production company: Nordisk Film

Original release
- Network: TV 2
- Release: 1 October 1988 – 31 December 2001

Lykkehjulet is the Danish version of the Wheel of Fortune television game show. Airing in 1988, the show was the first big American game show to be imported to Denmark and it was one of the first successes for Danish broadcaster TV2 when it became Denmark's second TV channel in 1988. The show ran for 3,599 episodes until it was cancelled in 2001 due to declining viewership and a failed attempt at modernizing the format in the final year.

== Format ==
The show originally used the "shopping" format of the American program in which winnings were used to buy studios prizes, such as furniture, appliances, and trips. In later years the format was changed to reflect the American version of all-cash winnings.

== Hosts ==
The host during the first season was Michael Meyerheim with Pia Dresner as the letter-turning co-host. Thereafter, the show was hosted by Bengt Burg from 1989 to 2000, with a short stint by Keld Heick during the 1996-1997 season. The final season in 2001 season was hosted by Lars Herlow. The letter-turning co-hosts were Carina Jensen (1989–1994) and Maria Hirse (1995–2001). The show's announcers during the run of the program were Ole Jacobsen, then Henrik Hannibal and later, Dennis Johannesson.

== Unique to the Danish version ==
There were several details which were unique to the Danish version of Wheel of Fortune.

- Theme song

The opening theme to the program was an original composition composed by Jesper Ranum.

- The wheel and podiums

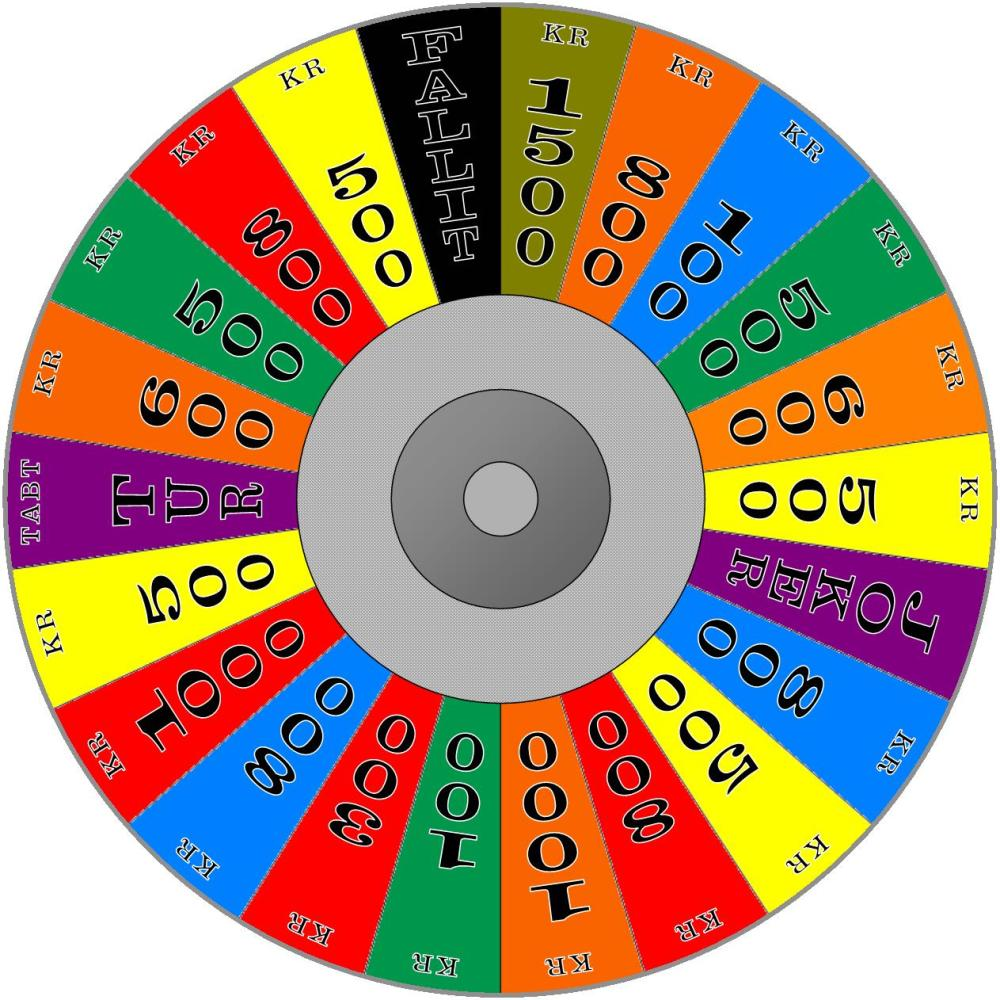
A recreation of the round one wheel from when Lykkehjulet premiered in 1988. Note: Instead of 24 wedges like many other versions of Wheel of Fortune, Lykkehjulet used only 22.

The multi-colored wheel had 22 wedges (each with 4 pegs) instead of the 24 wedges of the American show, and value amounts originally ranged from 100 to 1,500 kroner (2,500 starting in round 2 in 1989) to be used for shopping purposes. The podiums followed a blue-red-yellow pattern, as it did for several other foreign adaptions.

Beginning in 1990, the top value was 3,000 kr. in Round 1, then 5,000 kr. from Round 2 onwards. By 1999, the top value was 5,000 kr. in every round. In 1999, the Fallit/10,000/Fallit wedge would be placed on the wheel in the third round with the 10,000 section being treated as a regular space. In 2001, the top values were 2,500 points in round one, 7,500 in rounds two and three and 10,000 between two "garbage cans" in round four. The winner of each round kept their points and chose one of two prizes.

- Vowels

Vowels cost 500 kr. and were to be purchased prior to spinning the wheel.

- The Free Spin

Known as an "Ekstra Tur," ("Joker" in 1988) it was originally conceived like the US Free Spin, where it was an entire wedge on the wheel, and multiple Free Spins could be won. It eventually became a single token placed on the wheel. After landing on the space with the token, the player automatically picked it up and called for a letter to win the hidden amount beneath the token (usually 600 kroner).

- Bonus round

In the bonus round, the player must choose five consonants and a vowel and solve the puzzle within 15 seconds. At first, the player chose which prize to play for. By 1996, the player chose one of three round envelopes, each concealing one of three bonus prizes.

- Puzzleboard and sound effects

The letters on the puzzleboard were the traditional trilon shape for the first twelve years of the program. The bell indicating a correct letter had a high D-note pitch to it (similar to the sound effect used on the American version when a bonus envelope is taken), while the horn for a wrong guess or a Tabt Tur (Lose a Turn) was borrowed from the American version of The Price Is Right, and a downward whistle for "Fallit" (bankrupt) making a player lose all of their money and losing their turn.

2001 was also the first and only year the show introduced a video wall behind the contestants, but at that point, the puzzleboard still used trilons.

== 2018 revival ==
In October 2018, the series returned on TV2. The set, though modernized and simplified, has a look that is somewhat reminiscent of the original 1988 set. The original theme and several of the original sound effects are also used, some of them with a few touch-ups. Interestingly, the puzzle board uses the same dimensions as the original puzzle board rather than the current American dimension, although it is now electronic. It was hosted by Mikkel Kryger and co-hosted by Stephania Potalivo.

The format is also similar to the original version. Vowels still cost KR500 and the shopping format has also returned. KR1,500 is the top value in Round 1, KR2,500 in Round 2, and Kr5,000 in Round 3. Another KR5,000 space is added in Round 4. A Gevinst token (represented by a picture of a star) is added in Round 2. The biggest difference from the original version, however, is that every round starts with the winner of the previous round, exactly like on all three of the American pilots.
