= Oehlenschläger (disambiguation) =

Adam Oehlenschläger (1779–1850) was a Danish poet and playwright.

Oehlenschläger or Oehlenschlæger may also refer to:

== People ==
- Andrea Lykke Oehlenschlæger (born 1997), Danish singer and actress, sister of Saba
- Anna Saba Lykke Oehlenschlæger (born 1997), known simply as Saba, Danish singer, actress and model, sister of Andrea
- Sophie Ørsted (née Oehlenschläger; 1782–1818), Danish socialite and muse, sister of Adam Oehlenschläger

== Places ==
- Oehlenschlager Bluff, a bluff rock in the McDonald Heights, Antarctica

== See also ==
- Ollenschläger
