= Lucy Love =

- Born: Lucy Wilangi Siame; 1985 (age 40–41); Zambia
- Origin: Copenhagen, Denmark
- Genres: Grime; hip hop; electronic
- Occupations: Singer; rapper; artist

Lucy Wilangi Siame (born 1985), known professionally as Lucy Love, is a Danish rapper, singer, and artist.

== Early life ==
Lucy Siame was born in 1985 in Zambia to a white British mother and Zambian father. They moved to Copenhagen when Lucy was two years old.

== Career ==
Lucy Love has made two albums with her producer and band member Yo Akim (Joakim Hjejle), Superbillion and Kilo. Notable singles are "No V.I.P.", "Daddy Was A DJ", "Poison", "Who You Are" & "Thunder". She is also known for her visual liveshows.

In 2018, she participated in season 15 of Vild med dans, finishing in fourth place alongside professional dancer Michael Olesen.

== Discography ==
- 2009: Superbillion
- 2010: Kilo
- 2013: Desperate Days of Dynamite
- 2020: Hammerhead
