= International Dance Academy =

International Dance Academy (I.D.A)
- Copenhagen, Denmark and Los Angeles, California, U.S.

Information
- Type: Dance Academy
- Motto: An Education Of A Lifetime
- Opened: 2008
- Founders: Sonny Fredie Pedersen
- Website: internationaldanceacademy.org

The International Dance Academy is an educational institution in Copenhagen, Denmark and Los Angeles, California, U.S. It was founded in 2008 by Sonny Fredie Pedersen.

The academy is located in Copenhagen, Denmark and Los Angeles, California, with its headquarters in Copenhagen, and accepts students from around the world.
