= Blak (rapper) =

Danish rapper

Henrik Blak, better known by his stage name Blak, is a Danish rapper and songwriter.

== Career ==
Blak started writing and rapping in 2002. In 2007, along with Jimilian and Mido, he helped launch Flex Music, working as a main songwriter for the label.

In 2011, he released "Ta' dine stiletter af" using the name Enrico Blak.

In 2015 he released his single "Slem igen" using the mononym Blak and featuring Jimilian and Ceci Luca, which reached number 8 on Tracklisten, the official Danish singles chart. Hedegaard also released a remix of the song. Blak's biggest success has become "Nede mette", topping the Danish singles chart.

== Discography ==
=== Album ===
Title	Details	Peak positions
Title	Details	DEN
Sene nætter sydpå	Released: 27 December 2017; Label: Sony; Format: Digital download	10

=== Singles ===
Year	Album	Peak positions	Certification
Year	Album	DEN	Certification
2011	"Ta' dine stiletter af" (as Enrico Blak)	—	
2015	"Slem igen" (with Jimilian featuring Ceci Luca)	8	
2016	"Nede mette"	1	
2016	"Klip" (with Jimilian)	4	
2016	"Ik' min skyld"	7	
2017	"Banken"	17	
2017	"Skyldig"	23	

Featured in

- 2010: "Få dig et liv" (Jimilian feat. Enrico Blak)
- 2011: "Ghetto pt. II" (Mido feat. Jimilian & Enrico Blak)
