= Britt Bendixen =

Danish choreographer TV dancing judge and dance instructor (1942–2023)

Britt Bendixen (14 January 1942 — 18 February 2023) was a Danish choreographer and dance instructor who is remembered in Denmark for her many appearances as a judge in the television series Vild med dans. As a choreographer, she contributed to many revues, including Copenhagen's popular Cirkusrevyen year after year. Bendixen taught until 2015 at the Pejsegaarden dance school in Husum which she inherited from her mother. In 2017, she published her autobiography Et lyst sind.

== Early life ==
Born on 14 January 1942 in Copenhagen, Britt Bendixen was the daughter of the dance instructor Frode Godtfred Hekkel Bendixen (1907–1996) and his wife Mitzi Naemi née Podsedek, a dance instructor and restaurateur. She was brought up by her mother and her Swedish grandmother Edla Ekstrand (1881–1965) in the Pejsegården dance school which was run by her mother, first in Brønshøj then in Husum. Her parents separated when she was six. When she was 12 she was sent to a boarding school as her mother needed time to run the school. Bendixen was particularly competent in foreign languages and thought for a time she might work as a translator. She then spent a year in Switzerland as an au pair. By the time she was 19, she had been trained as a dance instructor.

== Career ==
From the age of 19, Bendixen worked as a dance instructor, training many famous and not so famous people. One of her most successful pupils was Mads Blangstrup of the Royal Danish Ballet. She increasingly devoted herself to choreography, contributing to many revues including Circusrevyen on numerous occasions. In 2015, she sold the Pejsegaarden dance school.

She is remembered above all for the many years she served as a judge in the television series Vild med dans, from its beginning in 2005 until she retired in 2021. In 2017, she published her biography Et lyst sind - er ofte en viljessag (A bright mind - is often a matter of will).

From 1965, Bendixen lived with the American choreographer Gene Nettles (1928–1994). Together they had a son Niclas Bendixen (born 1972) who also became a dance instructor. The couple separated in 1981. From 1997, Bendixen's partner was the IT expert Marianne Nybo (born 1960). The two married shortly before Bendixen's death.

Britt Bendixen died on 18 February 2023.
