= Margit Brandt =

Danish fashion designer (1945–2011)

Margit Bjørløw Brandt (27 January 1945 – 24 October 2011) was a Danish fashion designer.

== Biography ==
Brandt graduated from Margretheskolen (1961–1964), Københavns Tilskærerakademi (1964), and completed an apprenticeship in tailoring. She started her international career in 1965 as an apprentice in Paris with the grand master of the time French fashion designer Pierre Balmain. Her inventiveness and confident style won her recognition and in 1966 she continued her career in the couture house of Louis Feraud on Rue du Fauborg Saint Honore. In 1966 she married Erik Brandt, who was working with the French company Mendes (owned by the nephew of the former French President of the Council Pierre Mendes France), which produced prêt-a-porter for Lanvin, Guy La Roche, Yves Saint Laurent and many others.

The marriage would be the catalyst for one of the most successful Scandinavian designer couples. The Brandts returned to Denmark shortly after they got married and in 1966 Margit introduced her own collection at the Copenhagen Fashion Fair under the B-age label. In the eyes of her contemporaries this was a line of unprecedentedly short and close-fitting designs, but the collection immediately grabbed the interest of an otherwise neglected age group between teenagers and "genteel" ladies. B-age became the essence of fashion for the first generation of young women in Scandinavia.

Soon Margit and Erik were producing everything from ladies fashion to lingerie, furs, sportswear, watches, personal care products, household articles and accessories. The trendsetting designs found their way to the showrooms of Harrods, Bendels, Takashimaya, Saks and Bloomingdales, a wide network of own label stores sprung up across the world from London, Paris and Barcelona to Tokyo, San Francisco and New York City. Erik had a nose for branding and self-promotion, one year the staff at the fashion fair were replaced by a red telephone with a direct line to head office. Buyers could simply call in their orders if they wanted to buy anything.

As jetsetters the couple developed an eccentric group of friends based in and around the New York club Studio 54 where they developed close friendships with the likes of Andy Warhol, Mick Jagger, David Bowie, Diana Vreeland and Truman Capote.

In the 1970s, she designed for Butterick patterns.

In the early 1980s Margit and Erik Brandt announced they moved to New York permanently.

In 2005 again based in Denmark they have commenced designing and producing fashion clothes again.

In the book Fashion Genius of the World (1979) written by Serena Sinclair, Brandt comes second after the British designer Mary Quant.

Brandt died at home with her family due to chronic obstructive lung disease.

== Special mention and awards ==
- 1988: Margit designs the entry uniform of the Danish Olympic team.
- 1994: Margit Brandt's 60's designs are exhibited at Aarhus Women's Museum in Denmark.
- 1997: Margit designs gala uniforms for the Royal Danish Airforce.
- 2006: The Danish fashion award “Guldknappen” (the golden button) is given to Margit
- 2007: The Danish Queen Margrete II awards Margit with the Cross of Dannebrog
