= Christina Hembo =

Danish designer (born 1978)

- Born: 1978 (age 47–48); Denmark
- Education: Master Of Arts, Design, University of the Arts London
- Occupations: Jewelry and Watch designer, entrepreneur
- Title: Chief Designer, CHRISTINA Design London / CHRISTINA Jewelry and Watches
- Spouse: Claus Skødt Hembo
- Children: 2

Christina Hembo (born 9 January 1978) is a Danish Jewelry and watch designer and entrepreneur, who owns the company CHRISTINA Design London and formerly owned the Danish cycling team Christina Watches–Dana. She designs high quality Jewelry and Watches at affordable prices.

Christina Hembo has a master's degree from the University of the Arts London.

She participated in Vild med Dans 2010, the Danish version of Dancing with the Stars.
