= The Collector (2004 film) =

- Directed by: Lasse Spang Olsen
- Starring: Iben Hjejle; Kim Bodnia
- Release date: 22 October 2004
- Running time: 86 min
- Country: Denmark
- Language: Danish

The Collector (Danish: Inkasso) is a 2004 Danish action film directed by Lasse Spang Olsen.

== Cast ==
- Iben Hjejle - Laura
- Kim Bodnia - Claus
- Ole Ernst - Holger
- René Dif - Omar
- Allan Olsen - Kaje
- Erik Clausen - Harry
- Klaus Bondam - Sune
