= Peter Mygind =

Danish actor and television personality (born 1963)

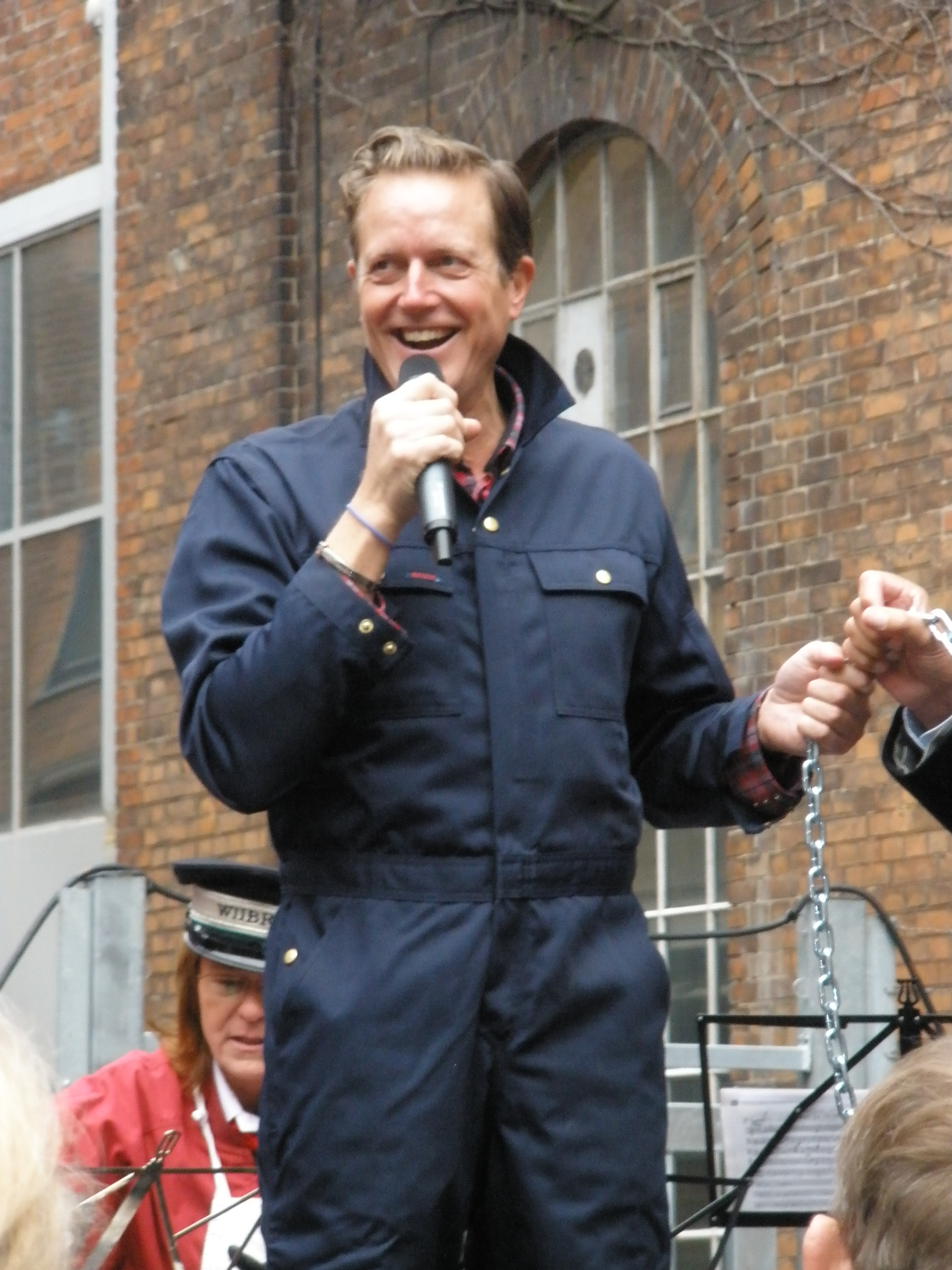
- Mygind in 2010
- Born: 28 August 1963; Frederiksberg, Denmark
- Occupation: Actor

Peter Mygind (born 28 August 1963) is a Danish actor and television personality. He has had roles in films including the World War II drama Flame & Citron as well as several TV series such as Borgen, Unit One, Lars Von Trier's The Kingdom, Sommerdahl (aka: The Sommerdahl Murders) and the police drama series Anna Pihl, as the roommate of the title character. Mygind hosted the Dansk Melodi Grand Prix (2011) and the quiz show Boom Boom. In 2005, he participated in Vild Med Dans, the Danish production of Dancing with the Stars.

== Filmography ==
Year	Title	Role	Notes
1991	Høfeber	Hubert	
1994	The Kingdom	Morten 'Mogge' Moesgaard	8 episodes
1996	Krystalbarnet	Myrdal	
1997	Hannibal and Jerry	Glarmesteren	
1998	Baby Doom	Max Ram	
1998	Afmagt	Den Fremmede	
2001	Flyvende farmor	Vagtmand ved færgeleje	
2001	Truly Human	Walther	
2005	De tre musketerer	Buckingham	Voice
2006	Sprængfarlig bombe	Tom Frej	
2008	Flame and Citron	Aksel Winther	
2010	Min søsters børn vælter Nordjylland	Onkel	
2012	Min søsters børn alene hjemme	Erik Lund	
2012	Kufferten	Officeren	
2013	Min søsters børn i Afrika	Erik Lund	
2018	Så længe jeg lever	Meisner	
2019	Last Christmas	The Dane aka 'Boy'	
2022	The Kingdom	Morten 'Mogge' Moesgaard	5 episodes

== Personal life ==
Mygind was born in Frederiksberg, the son of actress and theater director Jytte Abildstrøm and her husband, Søren Mygind. His brother is Lars Mygind. On 10 August 1996 he married television journalist Lise Mühlhausen.

== Public Speaking ==
- "Du kan, hvad du vil" [Achieve what you want] (in Danish).
- "Mobning" [Bullying] (in Danish).
- "Arbejdsglæde" [job satisfaction] (in Danish).
- "Sygehusvæsnet" [The hospital system] (in Danish).
- "Forældre og unge" [Parents and young people] (in Danish).
