= Mads Blangstrup =

Danish ballet dancer

Mads Blangstrup (born 26 February 1974) is a Danish ballet dancer. He became an apprentice with the Royal Danish Ballet in 1990 rising to the rank of principal dancer in 1998. In early 2014, he retired as an active member of the Royal Danish Ballet after performing in Kenneth MacMillan's Manon.

== Biography ==
Born in Copenhagen, Blangstrup showed an early interest in dance, becoming a Danish champion in Latin dance when he was only nine. Thanks to the encouragement of his dance teacher, Britt Bendixen, he entered the Royal Danish Ballet School in 1983. In 1990, he joined the company as an apprentice becoming a member of the corps de ballet in 1992, a soloist in 1997 and a principal dancer in 1998. As a principal, his roles included The Ballet Master in Flemming Flindt's The Lesson, the title role in Romeo and Juliet, the Prince in The Sleeping Beauty, various roles in Manon and Count Vronsky in Alexei Ratmansky's Anna Karenina.

Throughout his career, Blangstrup has demonstrated his abilities as a Bournonville dancer, as can be seen in his empathetic interpretation of James in Ulrik Wivel's film I You Love (2005) where he dances with Gudrun Bojesen in La Sylphide. With his commanding presence, he has danced the role of prince in Swan Lake and The Sleeping Beauty and has also demonstrated his talents in more modern works by George Balanchine, Peter Martins and Tim Rushton.

Blangstrup continues to work with the Royal Danish Ballet as a character dancer and teacher.
