= Truly Human =

2001 film

- Theatrical poster
- Et rigtigt menneske
- Directed by: Åke Sandgren
- Screenplay by: Åke Sandgren
- Produced by: Ib Tardini
- Starring: Nikolaj Lie Kaas; Peter Mygind; Susan Olsen
- Cinematography: Dirk Brüel
- Edited by: Kasper Leick
- Production company: Zentropa
- Distributed by: Nordisk Film (Denmark); Trust Film Sales (Foreign)
- Release date: 27 April 2001 (Denmark)
- Running time: 94 min.
- Country: Denmark
- Language: Danish

Truly Human (Danish: Et rigtigt menneske), certified as Dogme #18, is a 2001 Danish drama film written and directed by Åke Sandgren, and starring Nikolaj Lie Kaas, Peter Mygind, and Susan Olsen. Produced by Lars von Trier's and Peter Aalbæk Jensen's company Zentropa, the film was created following the Dogme 95 rules, and is experimental in style and narrative.

== Plot ==
A contemporary fable about an invisible man who is given the chance to become a real human being. "P" is an imaginary character in the mind of seven-year-old Lisa. He lives behind the wallpaper in her bedroom. One day the house is demolished and he emerges from the rubble. With no language or identity he sets out into the human world, ending up at a refugee centre. This is the start of the account of "P's" dramatic progress through decline on his way to become truly human.

== Cast ==
- Nikolaj Lie Kaas as P
- Peter Mygind as Walther
- Susan Olsen as Charlotte (as Susan A. Olsen)
- Troels II Munk as Stromboli
- Line Kruse as Tanja
- Søren Hauch-Fausbøll as Kjeldsen
- Clara Nepper Winther as Lisa
- Oliver Zahle as Benny
- Charlotte Munksgaard as Molly (as Chalotte Munksgaard)
- Klaus Bondam as Ulrik
- Peter Belli as Sedergren
- Hans Henrik Voetmann as customer in shoe shop
- Josephine Cadan as Zelma
- Jesper Asholt as Tern
- Henning Palner as Forsberg
- Anne Oppenhagen Pagh as Anna, secretary

== Themes ==
The film uses a Kaspar Hauser-like fantasy premise to tell a modern-day story that deal with sensitive issues like racism and immigration with a sharp edge to it.

== Accolades ==
Nikolaj Lie Kaas won the 2002 Robert Award for Best Actor in a Leading Role for his role as P.
