= A Funny Man =

2011 film directed by Martin Zandvliet

- Film poster
- Directed by: Martin Zandvliet
- Written by: Martin Zandvliet; Anders Frithiof August
- Produced by: Michael Ricks
- Starring: Nikolaj Lie Kaas
- Cinematography: Jesper Tøffner
- Distributed by: Nordisk Film
- Release date: 25 August 2011
- Running time: 90 minutes
- Country: Denmark
- Language: Danish

A Funny Man (Danish: Dirch) is a 2011 Danish semi-biographical drama film directed by Martin Zandvliet, and starring Nikolaj Lie Kaas, about the Danish actor and comedian Dirch Passer.

== Cast ==
- Nikolaj Lie Kaas as Dirch Passer
- Lars Ranthe as Kjeld Petersen
- Lars Brygmann as Stig Lommer
- Malou Reymann as Bente Askjær (as Malou Leth Reymann)
- Morten Kirkskov as Ove Sprogøe
- Frederikke Cecilie Berthelsen as Inge (as Frederikke Cecilie Bertelsen)
- Silja Eriksen Jensen as Judy Gringer
- Laura Christensen as Hanne Passer
- Sarah Grünewald as Vicky
- Martin Buch as Preben Kaas
- Laura Bro as Sigrid "Sitter" Horne-Rasmussen
- Martin P. Zandvliet as Mus & Mænd instruktør
- Klaus Bondam as Hjertelæge
- Julie Zangenberg as Lone Hertz
