= Laila Friis-Salling =

Freestyle-skier from Greenland

Personal information
- Born: 11 April 1985 (age 41) Qeqertarsuaq, Greenland
- Height: 171 cm (5 ft 7 in)

Sport
- Sport: Freestyle Skiing
- Partner: Mads Madsen

Laila Friis-Salling (born 11 April 1985) is a Greenlandic and Danish freestyle skier. Born to a politician and a businessman, she started snowboarding and later switched to skiing, taking up freestyle skiing due to a bet. Friis-Salling made her international debut in 2014 and competed in the World Cup series the following year.

She competed at the 2018 Winter Olympics with the support of the Danish Ski Federation and Greenland Ski Federation. She competed in the women's halfpipe but did not advance to the finals of her event. After her retirement from competitive skiing, she competed in the dancing competition Vild med dans and was the sixth contestant to be eliminated. There, she met her eventual husband, actor Mads Madsen. Together, they have two children.

== Early life and education ==
Laila Friis-Salling was born on 11 April 1985 in Qeqertarsuaq, Greenland. Her mother Augusta Salling is a politician while her father Jens Kristian Friis-Salling is a business owner in Greenland and was ranked Denmark's 80th richest man according to Berlingske. She has a brother named Bent who also serves as her coach. Friis-Salling started sport at the age of twelve when she started snowboarding and later switched to skiing. Her introduction to skiing occurred as the result of a bet – a friend wagered with Friis-Salling that she would not be capable of excelling in the sport, prompting her to immediately purchase skis. Within two months she was competing on skis in the Danish halfpipe championships. For her education, Friis-Salling studied psychology and later lived in Aalborg.

== Career ==
Friis-Salling made her international debut for Denmark in December 2014 in a competition in Copper Mountain, United States, and placed 17th in the competition. A few weeks after the competition, she earned enough qualifying points to qualify for the Nor-Am Cup held in Mammoth Mountain; there, she placed 15th. She then made her World Cup debut during the 2014–15 FIS Freestyle Skiing World Cup, placing as high as tenth during the racing circuit.

Friis-Salling's first World Championships appearance was at the FIS Freestyle Ski and Snowboarding World Championships 2017 held in Sierra Nevada, Spain, though she did not medal and placed 20th. A year later, she competed at the 2018 Winter Olympics in Pyeongchang, South Korea, representing Denmark. In the lead-up to the Winter Games, she suffered multiple injuries, including broken ribs, a concussion, and a dislocated elbow. She was supported by both the Danish Ski Federation and Greenland Ski Federation. She trained in Mammoth Lakes for her preparations for the Winter Games. At the Winter Games, she competed in the women's halfpipe and placed 23rd in the qualifying stage, not advancing to the finals.

== Post-retirement ==
After her retirement, she competed in the fifteenth season of Vild med dans, the Danish version of the Dancing with the Stars franchise. There, she was the sixth person eliminated from the competition. While at the competition, she met actor Mads Madsen and began dating in December 2018. They later had two children and were married in 2022.
