= Jimilian =

Danish-Albanian singer (born 1994)

- Born: Xhemilian Ismaili; 22 August 1994 (age 31); Laç, Albania
- Occupation: Singer
- Years active: 2006–present
- Label: Flexmusic

Jimilian Ismaili (born 22 August 1994) is a Danish-Albanian singer.

== Life and career ==
Ismaili's father was a well-known folk musician in Albania. The family left the country and lived temporarily in Belgium, until they applied for political asylum in Denmark. They lived in Center Sandholm, a receiving center for asylum seekers for a while before legally settling in Denmark in 2000. In 2006, Jimilian Ismaili competed in the Børne MGP (Danish Children's Melodi Grand Prix) under the name "Lil 'G" with "Penge". After the MGP, Jimilian continued to release music online, becoming popular through postings including "Elsker", "Virus", "Vibration", "Finde dit smil igen" and "Tættere på". Jimilian gained attention by featuring on "Ghetto" by Mido (real name Mohammed Zaghmout) and the follow-up "Ghetto Pt. 2" featuring Jimilian and Enrico Blak. He was eventually signed to Flexmusic, as was Mido. Jimilian's first charting single was "Hjerteslag" featuring Poeten entered Tracklisten, which peaked at number 20 on the official Danish Singles Chart in July 2012.

== Discography ==
=== Albums ===
Title	Details	Peak chart positions
Title	Details	DEN
Vejen mod toppen	Released: 2 December 2009; Label: Flexmusic; Format: CD, digital download	—
Ved du har mig	Released: 13 May 2013; Label: Disco:Wax, Flexmusic; Format: CD, digital download	21
Mig og mig selv	Released: 15 January 2016; Label: Sony Music, Flexmusic; Format: CD, digital download	9
Giomilian (with Gio)	Released: 7 August 2020; Label: Flexmusic; Format: CD, digital download	27
Xhemilian	Released: 3 May 2023; Label: Flexmusic; Format: Digital download	4
"—" denotes a recording that did not chart or was not released in that territory.

=== Singles ===
==== As lead artist ====
Title	Year	Peak chart positions	Album
Title	Year	DEN	Album
"Toget er kørt"	2011	—	Ved du har mig
"Hjerteslag" (featuring Poeten)	2012	20	Ved du har mig
"Hvem gi'r dig lov?"	2013	28	Ved du har mig
"Ved du har mig"	2013	—	Ved du har mig
"Ild i min flamme"	2013	—	Ved du har mig
"Jeg har glædet mig"	2014	26	Non-album single
"Damer på lager"	2015	—	Mig og mig selv
"Slem igen" (with Blak featuring Ceci Luca)	2015	8	Mig og mig selv
"Helt væk"	2016	—	Mig og mig selv
"Sommer sindssyg" / "Tid til mig"	2016	10	Non-album singles
"Klip" (with Blak)	2016	4	Non-album singles
"Farvel"	2016	18	Non-album singles
"Giv mig noget"	2016	11	Non-album singles
"Cockblock"	2017	15	Non-album singles
"Det der"	2017	22	Non-album singles
"Vai"	2018	38	Non-album singles
"Kick" (featuring 6ix9ine)	2018	2	Non-album singles
"Efter mig" (with Skinz)	2019	26	Non-album singles
"Monte Carlo" (with Fouli)	2019	16	Non-album singles
"Smid tøjet"	2020	36	Non-album singles
"Frisk på det hele"	2020	33	Non-album singles
"Dejlig" (featuring Fouli)	2020	1	Non-album singles
"Vågen"	2021	40	Non-album singles
"Kærlighedssangen"	2021	12	Non-album singles
"Lo Lo" (with Fouli)	2021	12	Non-album singles
"Du & jeg" (with Gobs)	2021	12	Non-album singles
"Too Late"	2021	35	Non-album singles
"Har det fucking godt"	2022	5	Non-album singles
"Kærlighed i luften"	2022	38	Non-album singles
"Fuego" (featuring Branco)	2022	39	Non-album singles
"Wow Wow" (featuring Branco)	2023	16	Xhemilian
"Fræk"	2023	12	Xhemilian
"—" denotes a recording that did not chart or was not released in that territory.

==== As featured artist ====
Title	Year	Peak chart positions	Album
Title	Year	DEN	Album
"Ghetto" (Mido featuring Jimilian)	2010	—	Non-album singles
"Mr. Casanova" (Dardan Jashari featuring Endrit Kol and Jimilian)	2012	—	Non-album singles
"Syndflod" (Sleiman featuring DB King and Jimilian)	2015	—	Non-album singles
"Jeg kan lide din vibe" (Skinz featuring Jimilian)	2021	34	Non-album singles
"From Paris to Berlin" (Infernal featuring Branco and Jimilian)	2022	6	Non-album singles
"Sort AMG" (RH featuring Jimilian)	2022	26	Non-album singles
"For mig selv" (Skinz featuring Jimilian)	2025	39	Non-album singles
"—" denotes a recording that did not chart or was not released in that territory.

=== Promotional singles ===
Title	Year	Album
"Penge" (as Lil G)	2006	MGP Junior 2006
"Elsker"	2010	Non-album singles
"Finde dit smil igen"	2010	Non-album singles
"Virus"	2010	Non-album singles
"Få dig et liv" (featuring Blak)	2010	Non-album singles
"Jeopardy"	2014	Non-album singles
"25 timer"	2014	Non-album singles
"Andre drenges piger"	2014	Non-album singles
"Standse en storm" (featuring Livid)	2014	Non-album singles
"—" denotes a recording that did not chart or was not released in that territory.
