= Sonny Fredie-Pedersen =

Danish entertainer

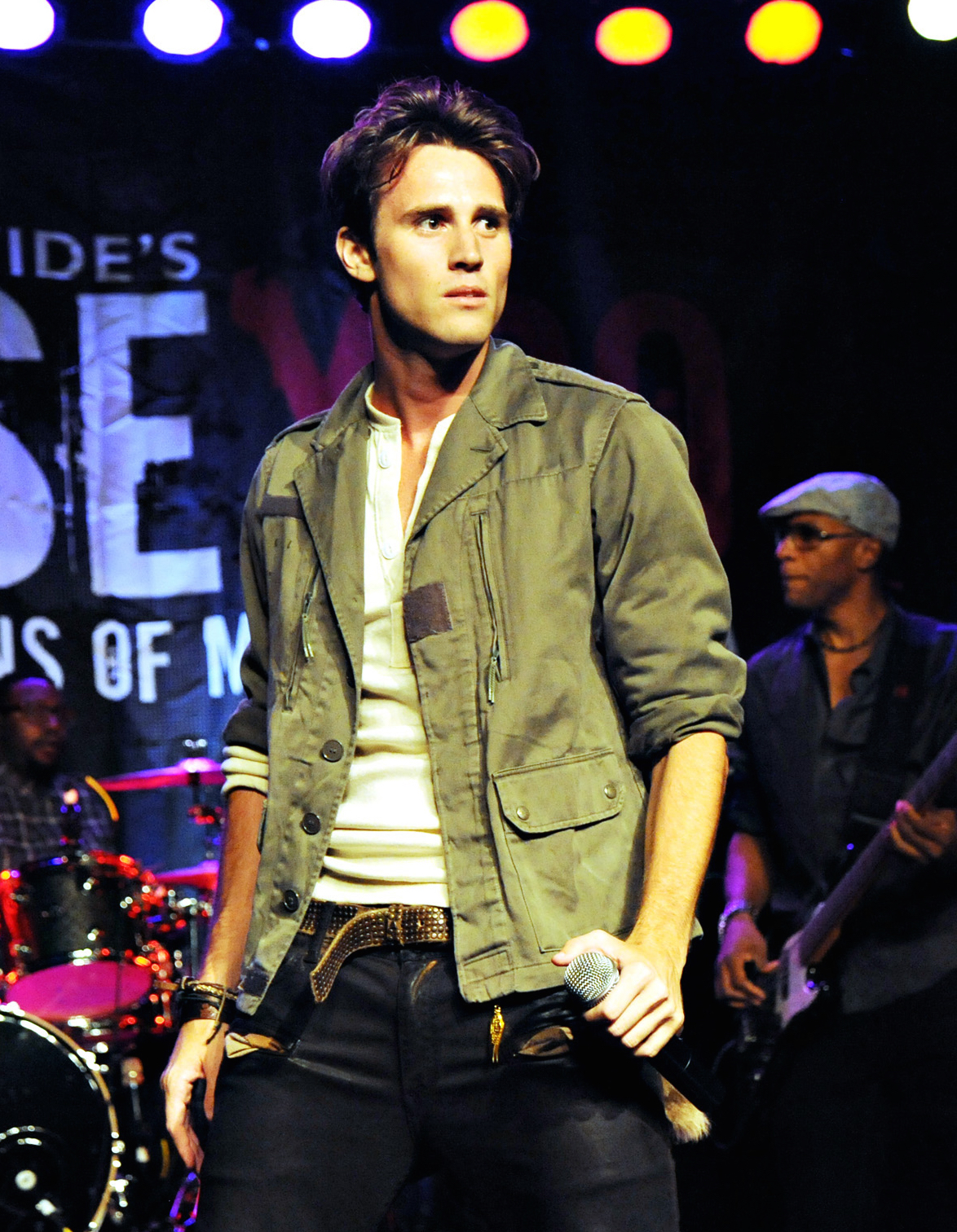
- Sonny Fredie-Pedersen performing in Hollywood, California

Background information
- Birth name: Sonny Fredie-Pedersen
- Also known as: SONNY
- Born: 6 October 1986 (age 38) Copenhagen, Denmark
- Genres: R&B; pop; dance
- Occupations: Entertainer; Singer; Songwriter; Dancer; Actor; Choreographer
- Years active: 1998–present
- Labels: Warner Music Group; Sony Music Denmark; Copenhagen Records
- Website: sonny-music.com

Sonny Fredie-Pedersen is a Danish artist. He was born and raised in Copenhagen, Denmark.

Fredie-Pedersen has been featured in several of his own national TV shows revolving around his life as an entertainer, such as Ingen Slinger I Valsen, Familien Pedersen, and Sonny, Dans og Stjernedrømme. In 2020, Pedersen served as a judge and captain on the Danish version of the BBC TV show The Greatest Dancer. In 2022, it was announced that he would join the Danish production of Dancing With the Stars, Vild Med Dans, as a new judge.

In 1998, Pedersen was the main subject of the documentary Ingen Slinger I Valsen. The documentary was awarded the Danish TV Oscar in 1999 and nominated for the International television award "Prix Italia". In 2024 it was announced by the Danish Broadcasting Corporation that a sequel to the award-winning documentary would be returning to the network in May of 2024 as a two-part telecast

In theater, Pedersen has played characters such as 'Danny Zuko' in Grease - The Musical, 'Baby John' in West Side Story, 'Troy Bolton' in High School Musical - On Stage, 'Pilot Gregersen in Simon and 'Bjørn' in Gummi Tarzan - The Musical.

As a choreographer and dancer, Sonny Fredie-Pedersen is credited with having worked with Christina Aguilera, Nicki Minaj, Taylor Swift, Paula Abdul, Kylie Minogue, Will Smith, J Balvin, Nicky Jam, Kenny Ortega, Pamela Anderson and Nicole Scherzinger amongst others. Pedersen is a former competitive dancer and has sixteen Danish National Championship titles in Latin and Ballroom on his record. He has worked and performed on International TV productions, such as Dancing With The Stars, America's Got Talent, The Oscars, Eurovision and The FIFA World Cup 2018

As a recording artist Sonny Fredie-Pedersen has released 5 albums since the year 2001. He has ranked in the Top 10 on the Danish Billboard multiple times and has released with labels Warner Music Group, Sony Music and Copenhagen Records. Since 2012 Pedersen has released music under his recording artist name SONNY.

Fredie-Pedersen is a recipient of the Danish award "Vibeke Rørvig Legatet", which is presented to notable dancers, singers, stage designers and theater figures with ties to The Royal Danish Ballet. He was a recipient at the 25th anniversary award ceremony in 2011.

Pedersen is the founder and owner of International Dance Academy with headquarters in Denmark. The Performing Arts Academy opened in 2008 and is based in Copenhagen, Denmark and Los Angeles, California.
