= Karina Frimodt =

Danish dancer (born 1978)

- Born: September 12, 1978 (age 47); Frederiksberg, Denmark
- Occupation: Dancer
- Website: www.karinafrimodt.dk

Karina Frimodt (born September 12, 1978) is a Danish dancer. She has competed in 8 seasons of Vild med dans, the Danish version of Dancing with the Stars, finishing 2nd in 2013 with comedian Uffe Holm. She has also appeared in a musical adaptation of the film Dirty Dancing, two seasons of the Cirkusrevyen revue, as well as in minor roles in Danish TV series Krøniken, Jul på Kronborg, and the last season of the Pyrus Series. In October 2016, she appeared in the cancer research fundraising show Knæk Cancer (lit. "Break Cancer," similar to Stand Up To Cancer) 10 months after twice having surgery for breast cancer.
