= Jens Werner =

Danish ballroom dancer (1964–2024)

Jens Werner (23 July 1964 – 9 July 2024) was a Danish ballroom dancer.

== Biography ==
Werner began dancing at age four, and at age 30 in 1994, was the World Amateur Champion. Werner lived just north of Copenhagen and opened his own dance studio in 2006. Werner has participated in season 2004, 2005, 2006, 2007, 2008, 2009, 2010, 2011, 2012 and 2013 as the number one adjudicator in Vild med dans which is the Danish version of Dancing with the Stars. He has also danced on the youth-oriented television station TV 2 Zulu, scantily clad. Werner died from cancer on 9 July 2024, at the age of 59.
