= Sisse Fisker =

Danish television presenter

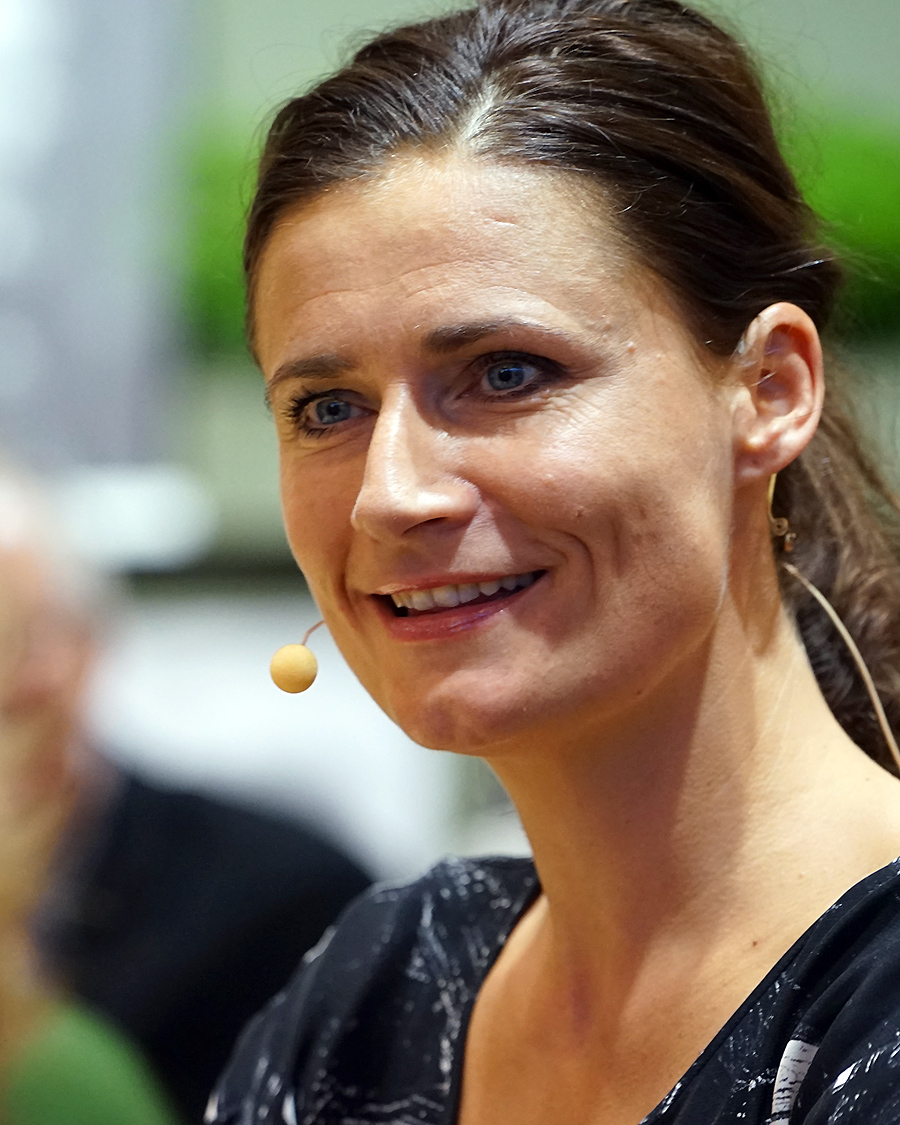
- Fisker in 2015.
- Born: 8 August 1976 (age 49); Tårs, Denmark
- Occupation: television presenter
- Spouse: Sune Mogensen
- Website: 2

Sisse Fisker (born 8 August 1976) is a Danish television presenter. From January 2007 to December 2014, she was a presenter at DR's daily news program, Aftenshowet on DR1, and she has been attending the "Healthy" exercise and health programs. During her time at DR, she has also helped cover several royal events and hosted the Danish Danse Grand Prix 2007. She previously worked on TV 2 Sport for 5 years. She has participated in the 2nd season of Vild med dans and participated in the program Et glimt af Danmark.

Fisker graduated from Hjørring Gymnasium in 1995. She has written the book Livets opskrift.

Fisker completed her first marathon race back in 2001 at Copenhagen Marathon, as ongoing reports for TvDanmark's local news in Skovlunde.

It took Fisker 3 hours, 51 minutes and ten seconds to complete the Copenhagen Marathon in 2007. On 28 June 2008 she ran a marathon race in South Africa, The Big Five Marathon, on savannah among wild animals.

Fisker is married to Sune Mogensen and together they have two sons, Samuel and Isak.
