= Gorm Wisweh =

Danish TV-cook, cookbook author, and restauranteur

Gorm Wisweh is a Danish TV-cook, cookbook author, and restauranteur.

== Career ==
Wisweh began to bake pizzas in his mother's café in Svaneke on the island of Bornholm in 2003. In 2008, he and five others opened the Italian restaurant Magstræde 16, on Magstræde in Copenhagen, where he acted as the head chef.

He founded Gorm's Pizza, a chain of pizza restaurants, which has earned him the nickname "the Pizza King" (Danish: Pizzakongen) in the Danish media. The first Gorm's outside Copenhagen opened in Brandts Klædefabrik in Odense in May 2017. A 67% share of the company was acquired by Orkla in 2018. The opening of eight new restaurants was announced after the acquisition. In 2021, the chain's founders reacquired a controlling stake in the company.

== Personal life ==
Gorm was born in Svaneke on Bornholm, where his parents owned the local hotel. He started making pizzas for his friends when he was 11 or 12 years old. He moved to Copenhagen to study, but came back to Bornholm to make pizzas in his mother's cafe. He was married in 2018 and has two children.

== Television appearances ==
- 2016 Vild med dans, TV2
- 2017 Vild med fisk, DR2
- 2019 Over Atlanten, TV5
- 2020 Maddysten: Co-host and judge, DR1

== Books ==
- 2016 Nordisk tang : en kogebog fra havet, ISBN 9788740609233
- 2015 Mine Favoritter, ISBN 9788740603972
- 2013 Gorm og 100% din ret, ISBN 9788792894298
- 2011 Gorms gryder, Vandkunsten ISBN 9788776952341
- 2009 Pizza, Gyldendal ISBN 9788702081862
