= Kaliber (band) =

Danish rap band

- Origin: Copenhagen, Denmark
- Genres: Rap, Hip hop, R&B
- Years active: 2012–present
- Labels: Sony Music
- Members: DB King (rapper); Livid (rapper); Face It (vocals); Mr. Mo (vocals)
- Website: kaliberdk.dk

Kaliber is a Danish rap-band from Copenhagen made up of rappers DB King and Livid rapper and vocalists Face It and Mr. Mo.

They had a charting hit with "Det Dødt Nu" in 2013. They are well known for their song "Hardhitter" featuring Danish boxer Rudy Markussen and boxing announcer Kurt Thyboe.

== Members ==
- DB King (also known by the pseudonym Dennis) - rapper
- Livid (also known by the pseudonym Jesper) - rapper
- Face It (also known by the pseudonym Martin) - vocalist
- Mr. Mo (also known by the pseudonym Mohammed) - vocalist

Members have also worked as solo artists and in other collaboration. Notable hits include:

- 2012: Sleiman feat. DB King - "Badboy"
- 2015: DB King - "Ridah"
- 2016: Sleiman feat. Livid & Mellemfinga'Muzik - "Bomaye" (reached #1 on Tracklisten)

== Discography ==
=== Albums ===
Year	Title	Peak position	Certification
Year	Title	DEN	Certification
2014	Udebane	17	

=== Singles ===
Year	Title	Peak position
Year	Title	DEN
2012	"Hardhitter" (featuring Rudy Markussen & Kurt Thyboe)	–
2012	"Vest For København"	–
2012	"Bobler"	–
2013	"Ku Ik Se Det"	–
2013	"Det Dødt Nu"	32
