= Claus Elming =

Danish American football player and television host and commentator

Claus Elming (born 20 March 1969) is a Danish former American football player and current TV host and commentator on TV 2 Sport.

Elming is best known for his 12 years of hosting Vild med dans (Dancing with the stars). He was also the host on the gameshow Pengene på bordet (Million Dollar Money Drop) for four seasons and the sports show Sportsquizzen (Question of sport) for four seasons.

Elming now hosts the two popular sports podcasts NFL showet and Veloropa podcast (professional cycling).

Elming first experienced American football when he went to Minnesota as an exchange student. Learning from host brother Chuck Schrope (reference to page 5 in Claus's book Bogen on Super Bowl) he quickly became a fan of the sport. Claus sent his little brother, Jesper Elming, a National Football League ball for Christmas.

Upon returning to Denmark after a year in the U.S., Claus started the Herning Hawks American football club with some other interested players. Some years later, Claus moved to Aarhus to study at the university, where he founded the Aarhus Tigers alongside Morten hertz and Kim Møller.

Elming also helped found the Danish American Football Federation, DAFF. And his father Torben Elming was later commissioner for the league.

Claus Elming later moved to Copenhagen after he took a job as an NFL commentator on TV 2 Zulu. Elming then started coaching the Avedøre Monarchs, which he did until 2002, and took them to two Danish Championships Mermaid Bowl.

In 2006, Elming was inducted in the Danish American Football Federation Hall of Fame.

Until the 2006 NFL season, Elming was a color commentator for TV 2 Zulu in Denmark, providing NFL-coverage alongside Jimmy Bøjgaard, who provided play-by-play-commentary. The Zulu-coverage of NFL ended thereafter, when Viasat acquired the Scandinavian NFL-rights. However, Elming will continue as commentator at TV 2 Sport, who air a portion of the NFL matches in Denmark.

Elming's favorite team is the Minnesota Vikings.

== Bibliography ==
- Bogen om NFL : amerikansk fodbold fra AFC til zone blitz (2004) ISBN 87-91303-34-6
- Bogen om Super Bowl (2006) ISBN 87-91303-50-8
