= Kiin Kiin =

Restaurant in Copenhagen, Denmark

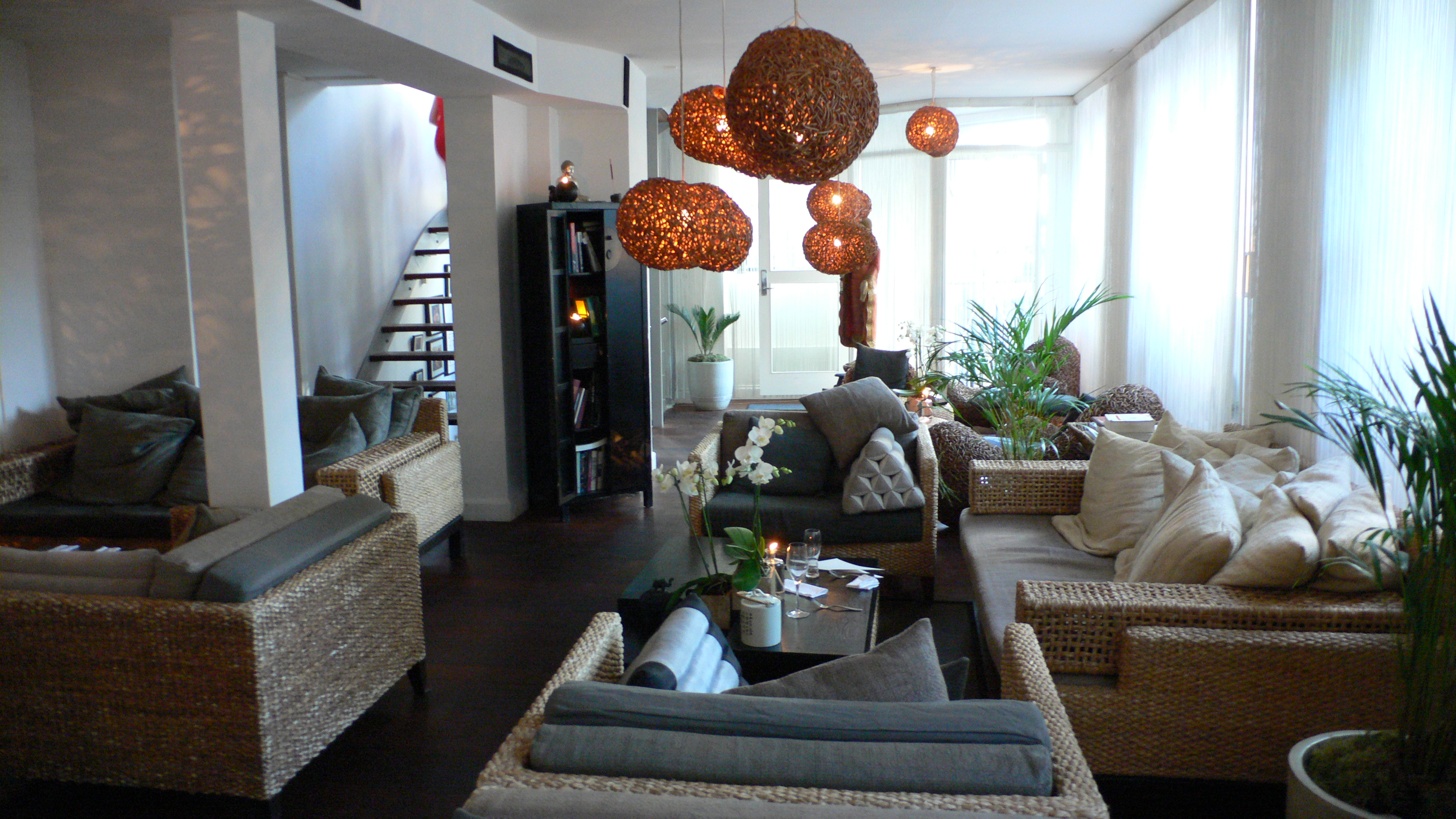
- Kiin Kiin in 2011
- Interactive map of Kiin Kiin

Restaurant information
- Established: 2005
- Owners: Henrik Yde-Andersen, Lertchai Treetawatchaiwong
- Head chef: Dak Wichangoen
- Food type: Thai
- Location: Guldbergsgade 21, Nørrebro, Copenhagen, Denmark
- Website: kiin.dk

Kiin Kiin (Thai: "come and eat") is a Danish restaurant serving Thai cuisine, located in Guldbergsgade at Nørrebro in Copenhagen. It was one of the few Thai restaurants in the world to receive a Michelin star. It was opened in 2005 by Henrik Yde-Andersen and Lertchai Treetawatchaiwong. Dak Wichangoen is the head-chef of the restaurant.

== See also ==
- List of Thai restaurants
