= Kurt Thyboe =

Danish journalist (1940–2021)

Kurt Thyboe also known as Thybo (24 January 1940 – 3 November 2021) was a Danish author, journalist, sports commentator and performer. He is very well known for his boxing match promotions and boxing ring announcements.

In March 2010 he released his single "Storyteller" in collaboration with writer and poet Claus Høxbroe. It was arranged and produced by Adam Ashtiani and Stik op Jakob, with guest appearances by trumpet player Miloud Sabri and Carsten Bentzen on vocals.

He also appeared in a very popular rap single and music video "Hardhitter" by Danish rap and musical band Kaliber that features boxer Rudy Markussen and ring announcements by Kurt Thyboe.

Starting August 2010, he appeared in Danish TV2 program Vild med Dans, a Danish version of Dancing with the Stars.

Thyboe died of pneumonia on 3 November 2021.

== Discography ==
- 2010: "Storyteller"

featured in

- 2010: "Hardhitter" (Kaliber featuring Rudy Markussen and Kurt Thyboe)
