= Bellafonte =

Bellafonte or Belafonte is a surname. Notable people with the surname include:

- Harry Belafonte (1927–2023), American singer, songwriter, activist, and actor
- Jorel Bellafonte (born 1995), Caymanian former track athlete, and current footballer
- Malena Belafonte, model, singer, entrepreneur
- Shari Belafonte (born 1954), American actress, model, singer, daughter of Harry Belafonte

== Fictional characters ==
- Amy Bellafonte, fictional character from The Passage novel series
