= Andrea Lykke Oehlenschlæger =

Danish singer and musical theatre actress

- Born: Sara; 11 August 1997 (age 28); Addis Ababa, Ethiopia
- Origin: Ringkøbing, Denmark
- Occupations: Singer; musical theatre actress

Andrea Lykke Oehlenschlæger (Danish pronunciation: [ænˈtʁeːæ ˈløkə ˈøˀənˌslɛːjɐ]; born Sara, 11 August 1997) is a Danish singer and musical theatre actress. She has sung with the Danish National Symphony Orchestra.

== Early and personal life ==
Andrea Lykke Oehlenschlæger and her twin sister Anna Lykke Oehlenschlæger were born on 11 August 1997 in Addis Ababa, Ethiopia. They were adopted from Ethiopia at eight months old and were raised in Ringkøbing, Jutland, since 10 April 1998.

Oehlenschlæger is married to Ludvig Brygmann, with whom she had her first child in 2023.

== Career ==
Oehlenschlæger and her sister moved to Copenhagen, with Anna starting off as a model and entrepreneur in teeth whitening products while Oehlenschlæger herself pursued a singing and musical acting career. Her sister would then follow her footsteps in early 2023, when she replaced her in the role of Dionne for the musical Hair due to Oehlenschlæger's pregnancy.

In 2022, Oehlenschlæger participated in season 19 of Vild med dans, where she danced with Eugen Miu.
