= Erik Rud Brandt =

Danish fashion designer (1943–2023)

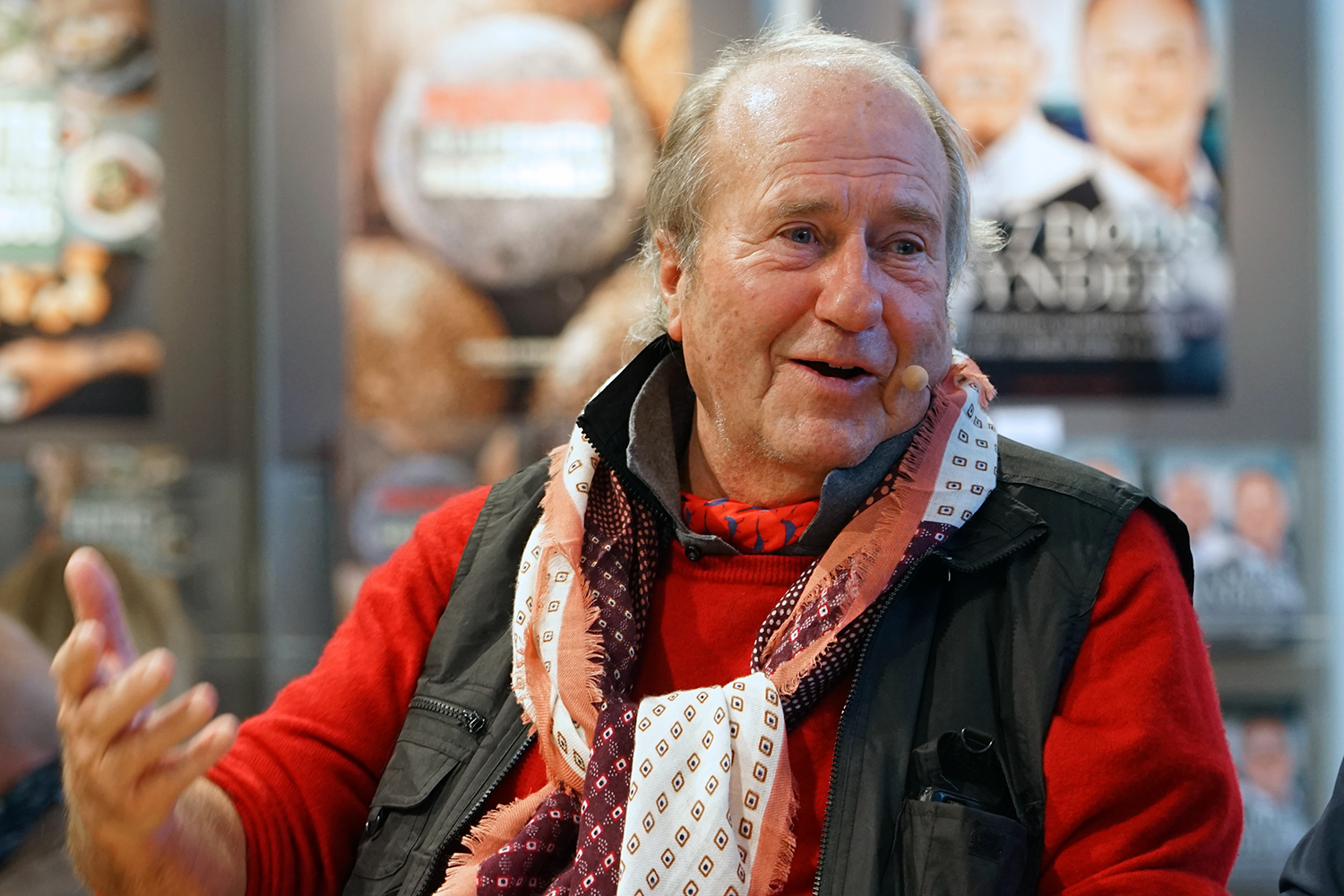
Brandt in 2018

Erik Rud Brandt (16 October 1943 – 11 March 2023) was a Danish fashion designer. In 1966 he married Margit Brandt and founded his own design company in Copenhagen with branches in Scandinavia, Switzerland, Canada, United States, Japan, and Australia. In 1981 they established Brandt's America, in New York City.
