= Dak Wichangoen =

Danish chef

Dak Laddaporn Wichangoen (born 13 September 1986) is a Danish chef and head-chef of the former Michelin-starred restaurant Kiin Kiin in Nørrebro. She also participated as a celebrity dancer in season 14 of Vild med Dans which is broadcast on TV2, in the show she placed fourth. Wichangoen was born in Thailand where she lived until the age of seven. When moving to Denmark she has lived in the village of Djeld, there she lived with her younger brother, her mother and her stepfather. Dak has also been a guest judge of Masterchef.
