= Mette Blomsterberg =

Danish pastry chef and restaurateur

Mette Jæger Blomsterberg (born 20 July 1970) is a Danish pastry chef, restaurateur and cookbook writer. She has been a judge in the television programme Den store bagedyst, the Danish equivalent of The Great British Bake Off.

== Biography ==
Born in Helsingør in 1970, Blomsterberg was trained as a pastry cook at Kransekagehuset, a Copenhagen bakery. She is married to Henrik Jæger whom she met in Helsingør in 1992. They have two children. Henrik, who has changed his name to Blomsterberg, works with his wife in the café they established in Lyngby in 2014. Mette Blomsterberg had previously worked as a pastry chef at the Ny Carlsberg Glyptotek (1995–2011) before opening a café in Copenhagen in 2011.

== Publications ==
Mette Blomsterberg has published the following cookbooks, all in Danish:

- Blomsterberg, Mette (2001). Forelsket i det søde liv. Møntergården. ISBN 978-87-7901-154-0.
- Blomsterberg, Mette J. (2011). Kongerigets kager. Lindhardt og Ringhof. ISBN 978-87-11-40463-8.
- Blomsterberg, Mette J. (2011). Blomsterbergs lækkerier. Politikens Forlag. ISBN 9788740002690.
- Blomsterberg, Mette J. (2012). Blomsterbergs Jul. Politikens Forlag. ISBN 9788740006438.
- Blomsterberg, Mette J. (2013). Blomsterbergs skønne klassikere. Politiken. ISBN 978-87-400-1366-5.
