= Klaus Bondam =

Danish actor and politician

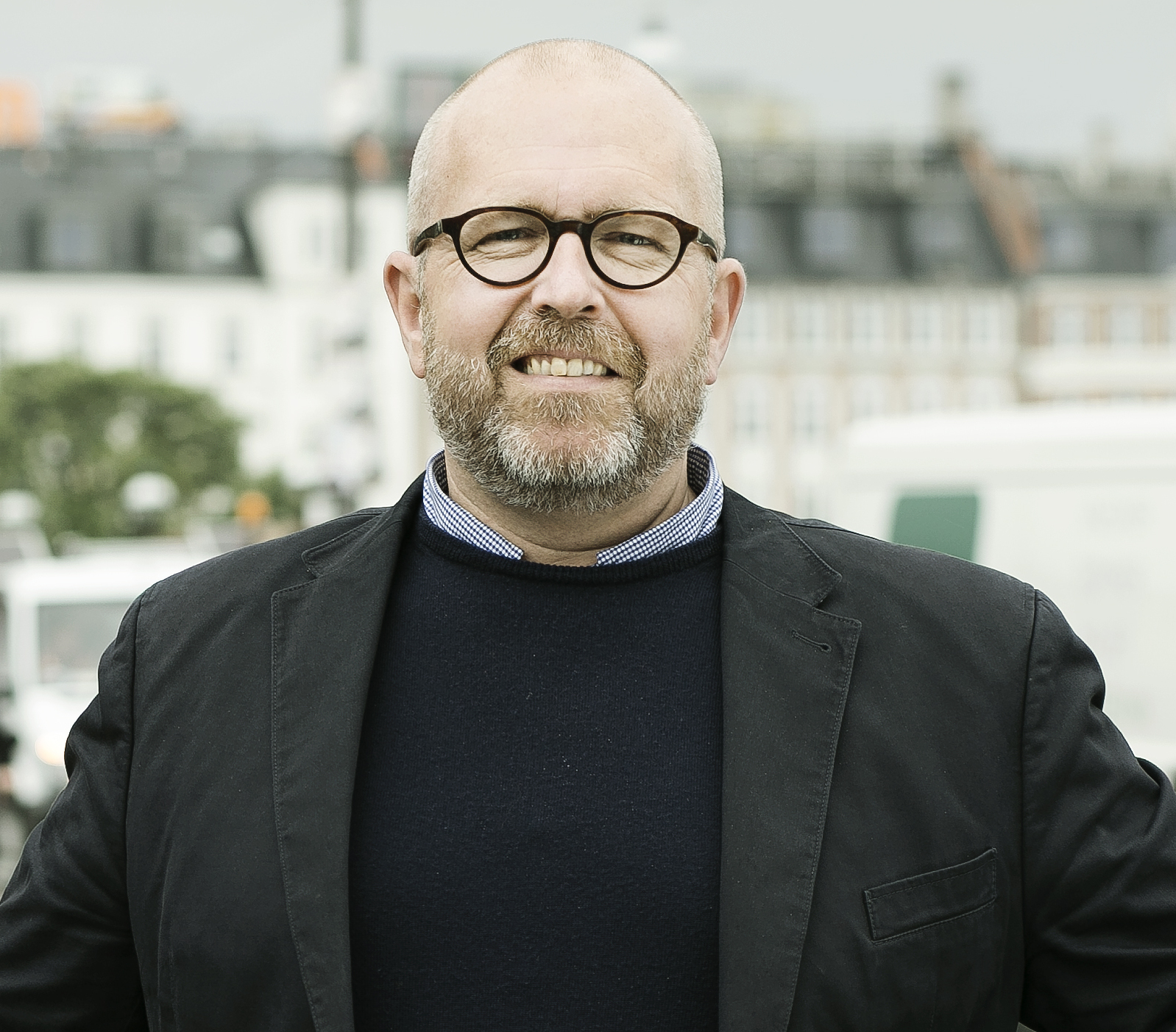
- Klaus Bondam in 2014
- Born: 19 November 1963 (age 62); Aakirkeby, Denmark
- Occupations: Actor, manager and politician
- Years active: 1988-present
- Spouse: Jacob Camp (m. 2007)

Klaus Bondam (born 19 November 1963, in Aakirkeby) is a Danish actor and politician.

== Acting career ==
Bondam has been the manager of two theatres, Grønnegårds Teatret (1996–2003) and Folketeatret (2003–2005), and has been administrative manager of Mungo Park theatre (1995–1996).

Klaus Bondam began acting on stage in 1988. His acting breakthrough came in the movie Festen in 1998, playing the German toastmaster at the party. He starred in the series Langt fra Las Vegas (2001–2003) as the sexually driven boss Niels Buckingham.

== Filmography ==
=== Film ===
Year	Title	Role	Notes
1998	Mimi og madammerne	Betjent 2	
1998	Festen	Helmut von Sachs, Toastmaster - Master of Ceremonies	
1999	Det Brune Punktum: Helbredelsen (Video)	Gay Man	Danish version of Pippi Longstocking
1999	The One and Only	Priest/Vicar	
1999	Mifune	Priest	
2000	Release All the Horses	Advokat	
2001	Shake It All About	The priest	
2001	Monas verden	Don J	
2001	Truly Human	Ulrik	
2003	Move Me	Henrik	
2004	The Collector	Sune	
2008	Journey to Saturn	Businessman Kurt Maj (voice role)	
2011	A Funny Man	Hjertelæge	

=== Television ===
Year	Title	Role	Notes
1997	Lex & Klatten	Speaker	TV series, 1 episode
1997	Taxa	Børsmælger	TV series, 1 episode
2000	Jul på Kronborg	Karl Gustafsen	TV series, 2 episodes
2000	Absolut Holberg	Ludvig Holberg	(TV movie)
2000	Skjulte spor	Simon	TV series, 2 episodes
2000	Edderkoppen	Gylling	TV mini-series, 5 episodes
2000	D-dag	Receptionist	(TV movie)
2000	D-dag – Carl	Receptionist	(TV movie)
2000	D-dag – Niels-Henning	Receptionist	(TV movie)
2001	D-dag – Den færdige film	Receptionist	(TV movie)
2001–2003	Langt fra Las Vegas	Niels Buckingham	TV series, 48 episodes
2002	Bertelsen – de uaktuelle nyheder	Speaker (voice)	TV series, 1 episode
2003	Nikolaj og Julie	Henning	TV series, 2 episodes
2003	Freak Show 2003	Niels Buckingham	(TV special)
2003–2004	Unit 1	Hagested, Justitsminister	TV series, 2 episodes
2004	Helligtrekongersaften	Antonio	(TV movie)
2004	Villa, Volvo & Vicki	Sven (voice)	(Short)
2004	My Ex-Family	Claus	TV mini-series, 2 episodes
2004	Better Times	Lærer Arne Dupont	TV series, 2 episodes
2004–2005	The Fairytales	Additional Voices	TV series, 2 episodes
2006	Klovn (TV series)	Klaus	TV series, 1 episode
2012	The Spiral	Torben Jensen	TV series, 2 episodes

== Politics ==
Klaus Bondam was in the political party Radikale Venstre and ran for mayor of Copenhagen in November 2005. The party's city council representation grew from five to seven seats. This was not enough to secure the mayorship. He was instead named Mayor of the Technical and Environmental Committee. He resigned in 2010 and left the party in 2013. He is no longer active in Danish politics.

In 2011, Bondam was announced as the new head of the Danish Cultural Institute in Brussels, Belgium. In February 2014, he came back to Denmark and became the head of the Danish Cyclists' Federation.

== Personal life ==
Bondam is openly gay; he has entered into a registered partnership with his partner, architect Jacob Camp since 2004. They later married, and they live in Odsherred.
