= Malena Belafonte =

Danish born spouse of David Belafonte

Malena Belafonte (born Malena Mathiesen) is a former international fashion model turned singer, performer, producer, entrepreneur and creative director. She is the daughter-in-law of singer Harry Belafonte and married to his only son, David Belafonte. Her sister-in-law is actress Shari Belafonte.

== Life ==
Malena Mathiesen Belafonte was born and raised in Jyderup, Denmark, but lives in New York City where she was contracted with Wilhelmina Models NYC. Her parents are Irmgard Mathiesen and Aksel H. Mathiesen. Irmgard is a soloist who was a docent at the Royal Conservatory of Denmark. Aksel was a composer who led the acclaimed orchestra Concentus Musicus of Denmark. Malena Belafonte toured with her parents and was taught to read and write music. Her father committed suicide in 1999 after battling depression. Belafonte moved to Paris to model, where she was linked to Pierre Caland, grandson of former Lebanese President Bechara El Khoury. She was often seen at the Paris nightclub Les Bains Douches in the company of Prince, Gipsy Kings, top model Nina Klepp, photographer Jean-Francois Jonvelle and Gunnar Larsen. In Paris she met singer Jean Beauvoir and appeared on his album Jacknifed through Columbia Records.

Malena married David Belafonte in New York in 2000.

According to a New York Times article on October 19, 2009, Malena Belafonte started The Speyer Legacy School with four other mothers, a private elementary school in New York for gifted and talented children from K through 8th grade.

The Speyer Legacy School won best New School in 2009 by the Blackboard Awards, and Best Gifted and Talented Program in 2010.

In 2009 Malena Belafonte won second place in Vild Med Dans, the Danish version of Dancing with the Stars. She was paired with professional dancer Silas Holst. In 2010 Holst and Belafonte won 3rd place in Fort Boyard, a reality TV series taking place in France focusing on endurance and competitions. Belafonte participated in the Danish version of 4 Star Dining, and Come Dine with Me in 2010 and 2011, placing top 3.

She is the founder of The Journey Fashion Festival, a fashion platform intertwining fashion collections, entertainment, acrobats, performers. She is also the founder of Pink Pirate Agency, representing international designers in the US and produces events in the Versace Mansion and other venues.

Belafonte is a contributing writer of Manhattan Bride Magazine, where she also has a column, called Once a Bride Always a Bride.

== See also ==
- City Streets (album)
