= Stephania Potalivo =

Danish actress

Stephania Louise Potalivo
- Born: Stephania Louise Potalivo; September 26, 1986 (age 38); Charlottenlund, Copenhagen, Denmark
- Occupation(s): Actress, comedian
- Years active: 1995–present

Stephania Louise Potalivo (born 26 September 1986 in Charlottenlund, Copenhagen) is a Danish actress and former child star. She is also a sister of Christian Potalivo.

== Early life ==
Potalivo debuted in 1995 in Jørn Faurschou film Farligt venskab ("Dangerous friendship"). She is also known for her roles in Lykkefanten (1997), Buldermanden, Far mor og blyp in 1996 and Mirakel (2000).

In 1998, she won a "Camério" at the Carrousel International du Film for "Best Actress".

== Career ==
In 2009–2010, she studied at the Danish film actor academy.

In 2012, she joined the TV 2 Zulu sitcom SJIT Happens, for which was nominated for a Robert for "Best Actress" in 2015. In 2015, she also appeared in TV 2's dance program Vild med Dans ("Dancing with the Stars") where she danced with Morten Kjeldgaard. The pair got 4 perfect scores and topped the leaderboard also 4 times. The pair achieved a place in the final but was beaten by Ena Spottag and Thomas Evers Poulsen.

== Filmography ==
Year	Title	Role
1995	Farligt venskab	Anne
1996	Far, Mor og Blyp	Pige
1997	Ogginoggen	Ida
1998	Forbudt for børn	Ida
1998	Albert	Sabrina
2000	Mirakel	Karen Elise
2016	Klassefesten 3 – Dåben	Nina

== TV series ==
Year	Title	Role
2014	Dicte	Stefanie Høgsbro
2021	White Sands	
