= Sofie Stougaard =

Danish actress

Sofie Stougaard (born 5 November 1966 in Svaneke) is a Danish actress who has had roles in, among other movies, Mifune's Last Song, and the Danish sitcom Langt fra Las Vegas. She has also participated in the Danish version of Dancing with the Stars.
