= Patrik Wozniacki =

Danish footballer (born 1986)

Personal information
- Date of birth: 24 July 1986 (age 40)
- Place of birth: Odense, Denmark
- Height: 1.86 m (6 ft 1 in)
- Position: Attacking midfielder

Youth career
- Herfølge BK
- Køge BK

Senior career*
Years	Team	Apps	(Gls)
2001–2003	Farum BK	0	(0)
2004–2005	FC Nordsjælland	0	(0)
2005–2007	AB	39	(7)
2008–2010	BK Frem	46	(5)
2010	Brønshøj BK	11	(1)
2011	Hvidovre IF	8	(2)
2012	AB	3	(0)
2013–2014	Skjold Birkerød		
2014–2015	BSV		
2015–2016	Sunred Beach FC		
2016–2021	FC Græsrødderne		
- * Club domestic league appearances and goals as of 2 February 2016

Patrik Wozniacki (Polish: Patryk Woźniacki; born 24 July 1986) is a Danish retired professional footballer. He is the elder brother of female tennis star Caroline Wozniacki.

== Biography ==
Wozniacki is the son of Polish Catholic immigrants Piotr Woźniacki and Anna Woźniacka. Anna played on the Polish women's national volleyball team, and Piotr played professional football. The couple moved to Denmark when Piotr signed for the Danish football club Boldklubben 1909.
