= TV 2 Sport HD =

- Country: Denmark
- Headquarters: Copenhagen, Denmark

Programming
- Picture format: 720p (HDTV)

Ownership
- Owner: TV 2 Sport A/S
- Sister channels: TV 2 TV 2 Charlie; TV 2 Fri; TV 2 News; TV 2 Zulu

History
- Launched: 2 January 2008; 17 years ago
- Closed: 7 January 2013; 12 years ago
- Replaced by: TV3 Sport 1
- Former names: TV 2 Sport Xtra (before launch)

TV 2 Sport HD was the high-definition television sister channel to Danish television channel TV 2 Sport. It was launched on 2 January 2008.

== History ==
With effect from the turn of the year 2010/2011, TV 2 Sport HD became a mirror of TV 2 Sport, after which the content of the two channels was completely identical. The channel was later taken over by Modern Times Group (MTG) and relayed on 7 January 2013 as TV3 Sport 1.
