= Jes Sanddal Lindholt =

Danish vascular surgeon, physician, author, and academic

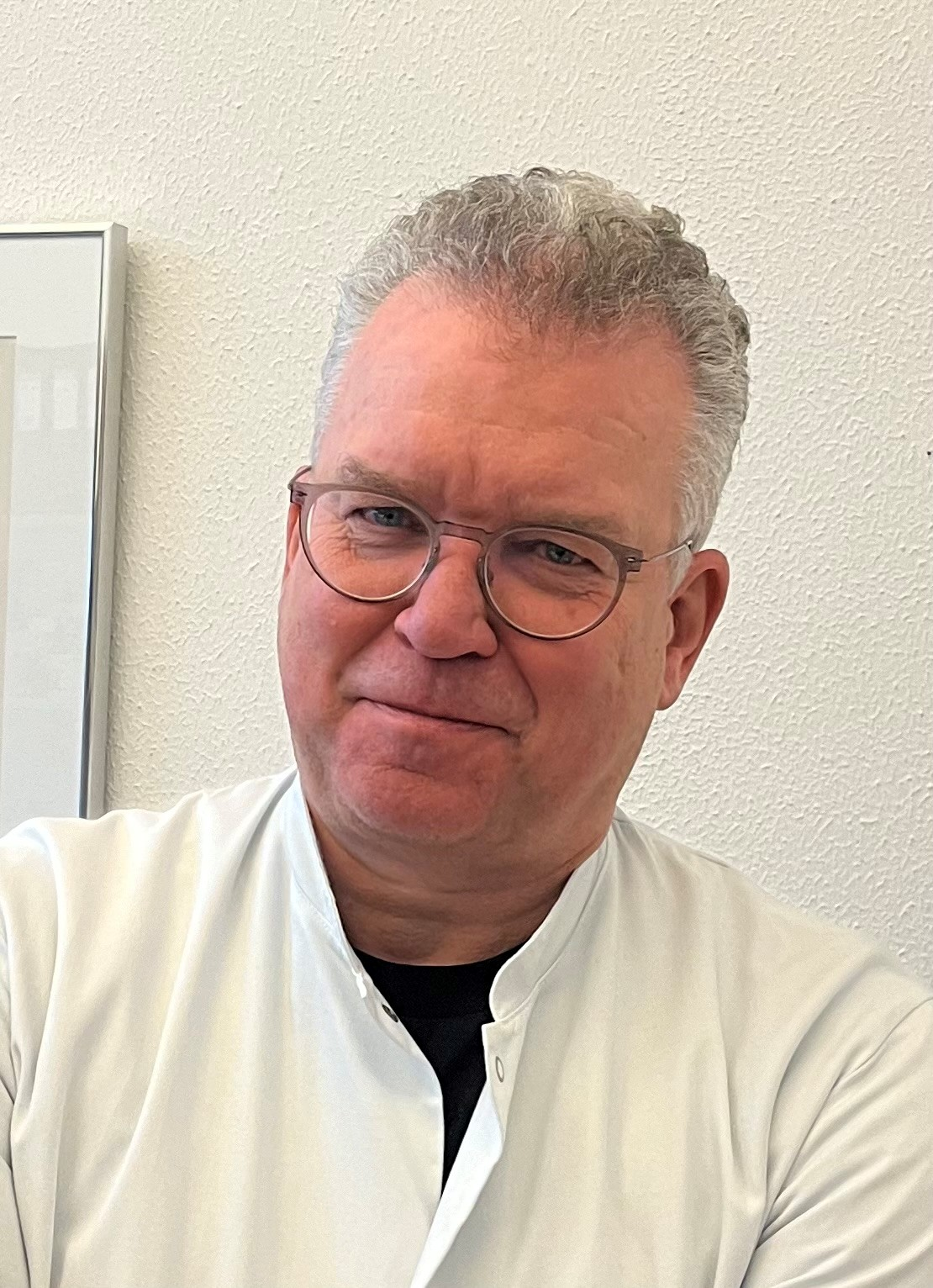
- Occupations: Vascular surgeon, physician, author and academic

Academic background
- Education: MD; PhD in Medicine; Medical Degree in Sciences
- Alma mater: Aarhus University
- Thesis: Abdominal aortic aneurysms

Academic work
- Institutions: University of Southern Denmark; Odense University Hospital

Jes Sanddal Lindholt is a Danish vascular surgeon, physician, author, and academic. He is a professor of vascular surgery and Head of the Cardiovascular Excellence Center in Region South as well as a research leader for the Department of Cardiothoracic and Vascular Surgery at the University of Southern Denmark and Odense University Hospital. He also holds the position of adjunct professor of vascular epidemiology at Aarhus University.

Lindholt's research primarily centers on epidemiology and prevention related to cardiovascular and renal failure, along with a focus on public health and translational medicine. He has contributed to more than three hundred publications, including book chapters, editorials, and review articles. He won the Odd Fellow Order researcher award in 2016.

Lindholt held a position on the advisory board for the National Board of Health regarding national screening programs, and the Danish Society of Vascular Surgery.

== Early life and education ==
Lindholt earned his MD in 1990, and received his PhD from Aarhus University in 1998, with the Viborg study that led the way for adopting abdominal aortic aneurysm (AAA) screening globally, serving as the basis for his thesis. During this time, he served as a research fellow at Viborg Sygehus from 1994 to 1998 and became a specialist in vascular surgery in 2003. After his education at Aarhus University Hospital and Rigshospitalet, he became a Fellow of the European Board of Vascular Surgery in 2006 and earned his medical degree in sciences from Aarhus University in 2010.

== Career ==
Lindholt's academic career began in 1999 as a clinical instructor for medical students at Viborg Hospital. From 2003 to 2012, he taught vascular surgery at Rigshospitalet and Viborg Hospital, where he held the position of associate professor and consultant of vascular surgery from 2004 to 2012. In 2012, he took the role of professor of vascular epidemiology and has been serving as a professor of vascular surgery within the Department of Cardiothoracic and Vascular Surgery at the University of Southern Denmark and Odense University Hospital. Additionally, he serves as an adjunct professor of vascular epidemiology at Aarhus University.

Lindholt served as a research leader at Viborg Hospital from 2004 to 2012, and later as a member of the Research Council at Odense University Hospital from 2016 to 2022. Since 2016, he has been holding an appointment as a research leader of the Cardiothoracic and Vascular Research Unit at Odense University Hospital and the University of Southern Denmark.

From 2008 to 2011, he co-founded the EU-FP7 project, Fighting Aneurysmal Disease (FAD) and in 2008, he assumed the role of principal investigator for the Viborg Vascular Screening Trial (VIVA), contributing to advances in vascular screening. In 2013, he co-founded the Elite Research Center of Individualized Medicine in Arterial Disease (CIMA) and became the PI for the Danish Cardiovascular Screening Trial (DANCAVAS) in 2014. He also served as the chairman for the Vascular Specialist Council of Southern Denmark in 2015 to 2023 and Clinical Cardiovascular Centre of Excellence (CAVAC) in 2016 to 2020. In 2022, he coordinated both the EU-Horizon2020 project TELEGRAFT and the Innovation Fund Grand Solution project PREPARE.

== Media exposure ==
Lindholt has been a frequent guest in various media outlets, discussing his cardiovascular screening studies and their impact on preventing deaths. He appeared on TV Syd to discuss The DANCAVAS studies involving cardiovascular screening of 15,000 men in the Southern Denmark Region. He also featured on TV Midtvest, highlighting the importance of screening programs and the prevalence of undiagnosed cardiovascular diseases. On TV 2, he underscored the impact of the VIVA screening program, stating that it reduces mortality in 65-74 year old men by up to seven percent and on DR TV, he advocated for screening for Abdominal Aortic Aneurysms in a documentary produced by Peter Q. Geisling. Additionally, he discussed his computer-based program for predicting cardiovascular disease risk (PREPARE) in Fyens Stiftstidende and P4, emphasizing its potential to detect and prevent nearly half of the cases by homebased risk assessment using artificial intelligence.

== Research ==
Lindholt is most known for his research in cardiovascular epidemiology, public health, abdominal aortic aneurysms and translational medicine, with a specific focus on screening and prevention, biomarkers, medical treatment of aneurysms, aortic dissection and rupture. In recent years, his work has provided insights into lower limb atherosclerosis, stemming from preventive population studies conducted at VIVA and DANCAVAS.

Lindholt has made contributions to the areas of cardiovascular epidemiology and prevention. In his VIVA trial, more than 50,000 men aged 65–74 were randomised into screening and non-screening groups revealing that, after 4.4 years, the screening group exhibited a 7% reduced risk of all-cause mortality compared to the non-screening group corresponding to screening of 169 men on average saved one life. He further developed this research, by leading the DANCAVS trials randomizing more the 78,000 men aged 65–74 to a cardiovascular screening examination including cardiac CT scanning for coronary artery calcification. After 5 years, the overall mortality in the invited group were reduced by 5%, mainly in the group aged 65–69, were mortality risk were reduced by 11%. The established database and biobank were used by artificial intelligence to develop a homebased test for early detection of cardiovascular disease using a computer-based tool to offer personalized risk assessments as well as to develop an automated screening tool for lung cancer. Additionally, he served from 2015-2022 in the guideline committee of the European Society for Vascular Surgery and provided several guidelines and recommendations for clinicians dealing with vascular diseases, among others carotid disease. and abdominal aortic aneurysms.

=== Abdominal aortic aneurysms management ===
Lindholt has researched abdominal aortic aneurysms, including improved processes for early detection and management. In his research on the validation of ultrasonographic scanning for abdominal aortic aneurysms, he screened men from age 65 to 73 to support the validity of using ultrasound (US) as a screening method for AAAs due to its high diagnostic sensitivity and specificity. He expanded on this research by directing mass screening for abdominal aortic aneurysms, revealing a 67% reduction in specific mortality in the control group, leading to 75% fewer emergency operations. He was also part of the global combined meta-analysis of GWAS and proteomics. This analysis involved more than 33000 patients with abdominal aortic aneurysms and revealed PSK9 as the most dominant cause while emphasizing the presence of commercial drug inhibitors, hinting at the possibility of a first non-invasive medical treatment.

Lindholt conducted research to identify potential systemic biomarkers for AAA, highlighting serum elastin peptides and plasmin-antiplasmin complexes as the most strongly associated biomarkers. Furthermore, his investigation into the cost-effectiveness of AAA screening revealed a reduction in hospital deaths related to AAA, with an estimated cost of approximately £555 per quality adjusted life year gained. He launched the HUNT research program with the goal of developing a medical treatment and discovered intraluminal pentagalloyl, which underwent clinical testing in the USA capable of blocking aneurysm progression in pigs.

=== Public health and patient outcomes ===
Apart from the population-based screening trials, Lindholt's research on public health has dealt with health concerns related to smoking and dialysis treatment. He took part in genome-wide association analyses to explore the genetic factors influencing smoking behavior observing nominal associations with lung cancer risk to identify three genomic regions linked to cigarettes smoked per day, revealing new associations at 19q13 and 8p11. He also took the initiative to coordinate the EU-funded TELEGRAFT project to develop the first ever drug-eluting artificial blood vessel to enhance sustainability, dialysis safety and tissue integration with remote monitoring, potentially reducing healthcare costs, which ultimately can improve bypass surgery outcomes.

== Awards and honors ==
- 2016 – Odd Fellow Prize, Copenhagen, Aarhus and Southern Denmark
- 2017 – Publication Prize, University of Southern Denmark
- 2018 – Research Prize, Danish Heart Foundation

== Bibliography ==
=== Books ===
- Considerations and experiences of screening for abdominal aortic aneurysms (1998) ISBN 87-7749-185-8 (PhD Thesis)
- Udvikling og validering af QL5. Et kort globalt og generisk livskvalitetsmål (1999) ISBN 87-90190-20-3

=== Selected articles ===
- Lindholt, J. S., Juul, S., Fasting, H., & Henneberg, E. W. (2005). Screening for abdominal aortic aneurysms: single centre randomised controlled trial. Bmj, 330(7494), 750.
- Søgaard, R., Laustsen, J., & Lindholt, J. S. (2012). Cost effectiveness of abdominal aortic aneurysm screening and rescreening in men in a modern context: evaluation of a hypothetical cohort using a decision analytical model. Bmj, 345.
- Lindholt, J. S., & Søgaard, R. (2017). Population screening and intervention for vascular disease in Danish men (VIVA): a randomised controlled trial. The Lancet, 390(10109), 2256-2265.
- Lindholt, J. S., Søgaard, R., Rasmussen, L. M., Mejldal, A., Lambrechtsen, J., Steffensen, F. H., ... & Diederichsen, A. C. P. (2022). Five-year outcomes of the Danish Cardiovascular Screening (DANCAVAS) trial. New England Journal of Medicine, 387(15), 1385-1394.
- Thorgeirsson, T. E., Gudbjartsson, D. F., Surakka, I., Vink, J. M., Amin, N., Geller, F., ... & Stefansson, K. (2010). Sequence variants at CHRNB3–CHRNA6 and CYP2A6 affect smoking behavior. Nature genetics, 42(5), 448-453.
- Riambau, V., Böckler, D., Brunkwall, J., Cao, P., Chiesa, R., Coppi, G., ... & ESVS Guidelines Committee. (2017). Editor's choice–management of descending thoracic aorta diseases: clinical practice guidelines of the European Society for Vascular Surgery (ESVS). European Journal of Vascular and Endovascular Surgery, 53(1), 4-52.
- Wanhainen, A., Verzini, F., Van Herzeele, I., Allaire, E., Bown, M., Cohnert, T., ... & ESVS Guidelines Committee. (2019). Editor's choice–European Society for Vascular Surgery (ESVS) 2019 clinical practice guidelines on the management of abdominal aorto-iliac artery aneurysms. European Journal of Vascular and Endovascular Surgery, 57(1), 8-93.
