= Allégade =

Street in Frederiksberg Municipality, Denmark

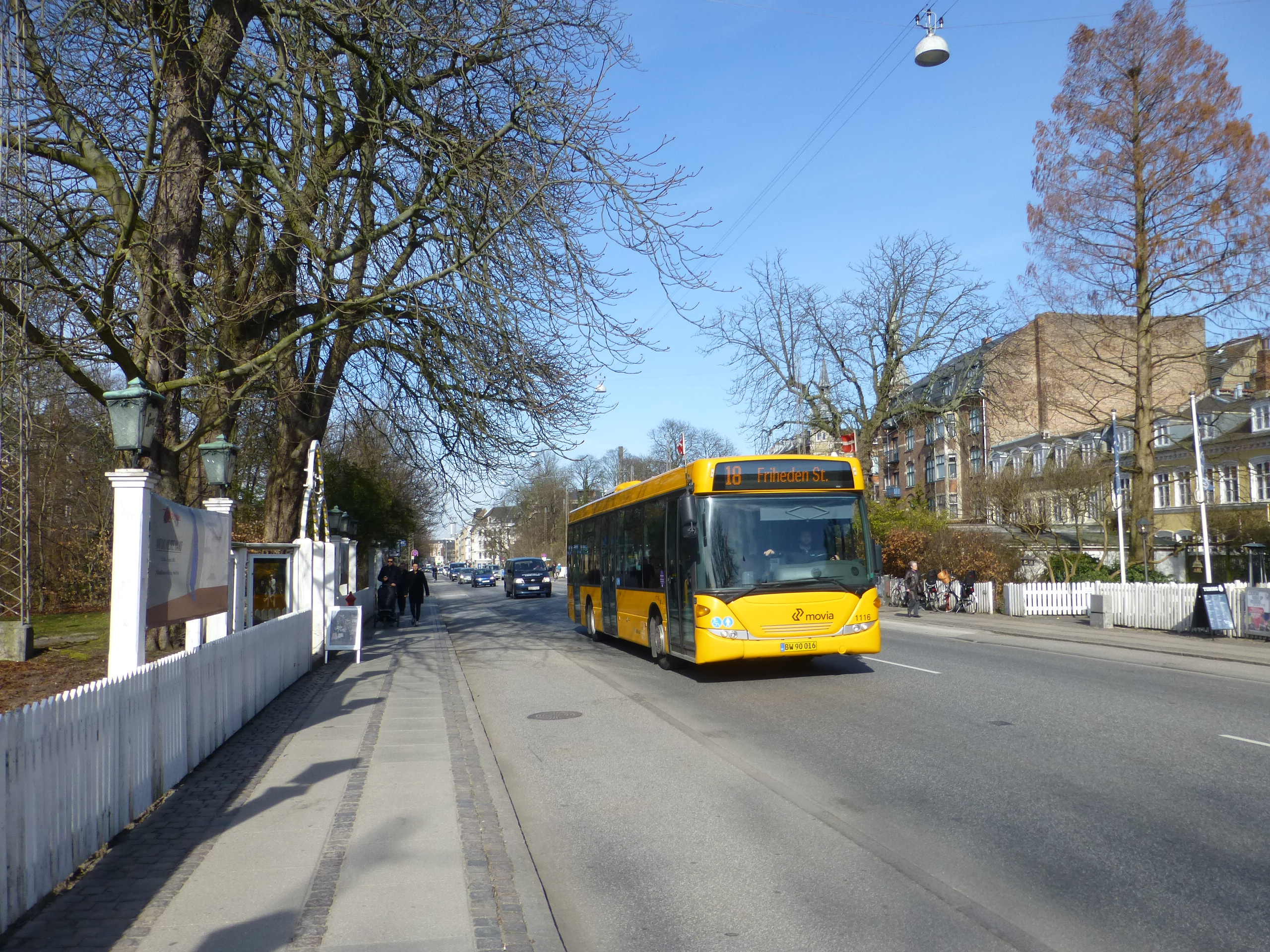
- Allégade
- Length: 393 m (1,289 ft)
- Location: Frederiksberg, Copenhagen, Denmark
- Postal code: 2000
- Coordinates: 55°40′35.04″N 12°31′57.72″E

Allégade (lit. "Avenue Street") is the oldest street in the Frederiksberg district of Copenhagen, Denmark. It runs from Frederiksberg Runddel to Frederiksberg Town Hall Square, along the east side of Frederiksberg Gardens, connecting Pile Allé to Falkoner Allé. The streetscape is, in spite of the central location, characterized by houses that are pulled back from the street with front gardens behind white fences. Several buildings are old country houses from the time when Frederiksberg was a summer destination outside Copenhagen. Along the northernmost part of the street, on its west side, is a narrow garden complex, Digterlunden (literally "Poet's Grove") with a statue of Holger Drachmann.

== History ==
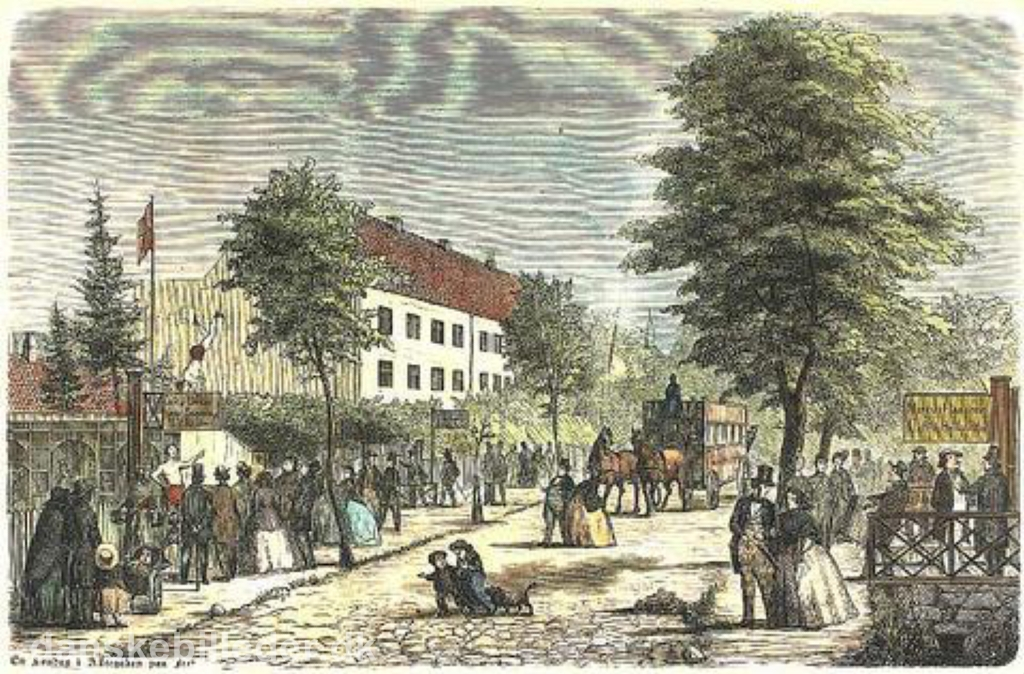
A Sunday in Allégade, illustration from Illustreret Tidende (1861)

The street was founded as the main street of a new community, known variously as Ny Holænnerby ("New Dutch Town") or Nt Amager ("New Amager"), which was founded when King Christian III transferred 20 Dutch families from Amager in 1651. They built their tenant farms on both sides of the street.

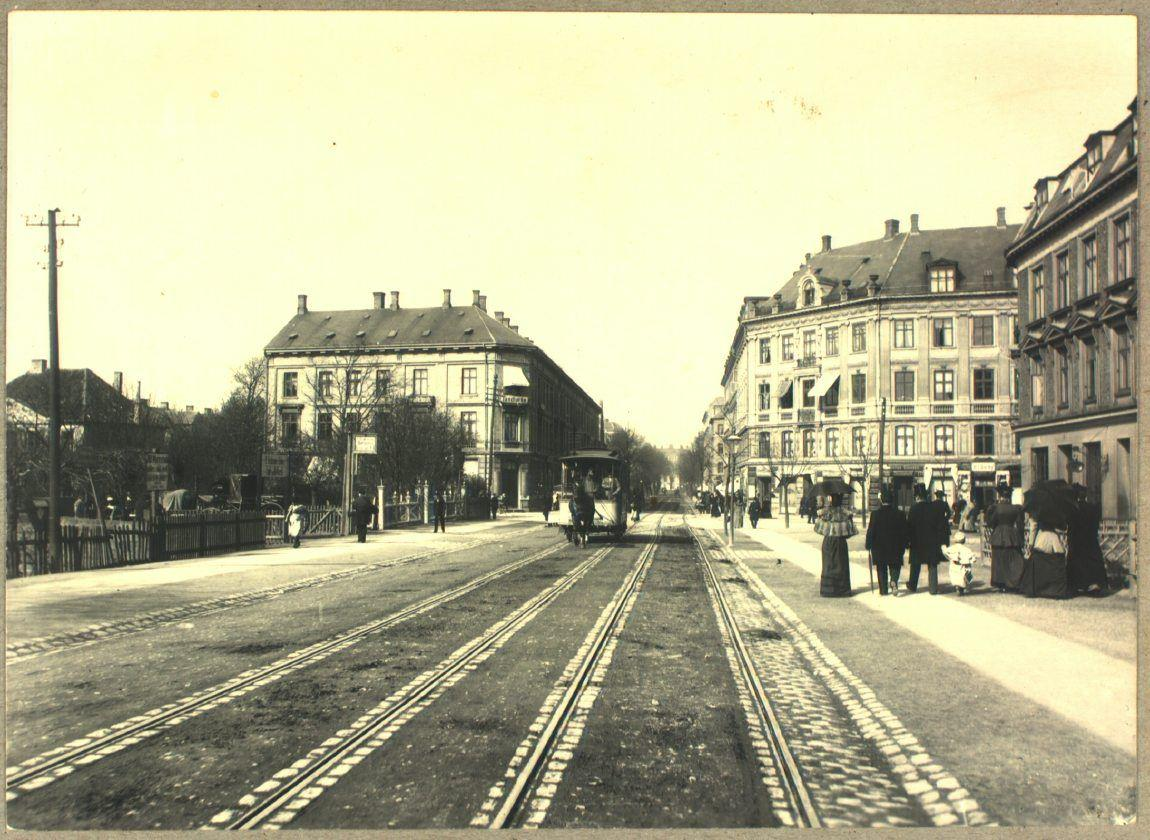
Allégade in circa 1890

New Dutch Town was destroyed by Swedish troops during the Siege of Copenhagen in 1658 in the Second Northern War. After the war, the Dutch community returned to the area but, struck with deep poverty, a new church was not completed until 1681

After the turn of the century, the area changed dramatically when King Frederick IV built Frederiksberg Palace on a nearby hilltop. The Dutch farmers were forced away from the area which became a fashionable summer destination, from 1710 known as Frederiksberg.

== Notable buildings and residents ==
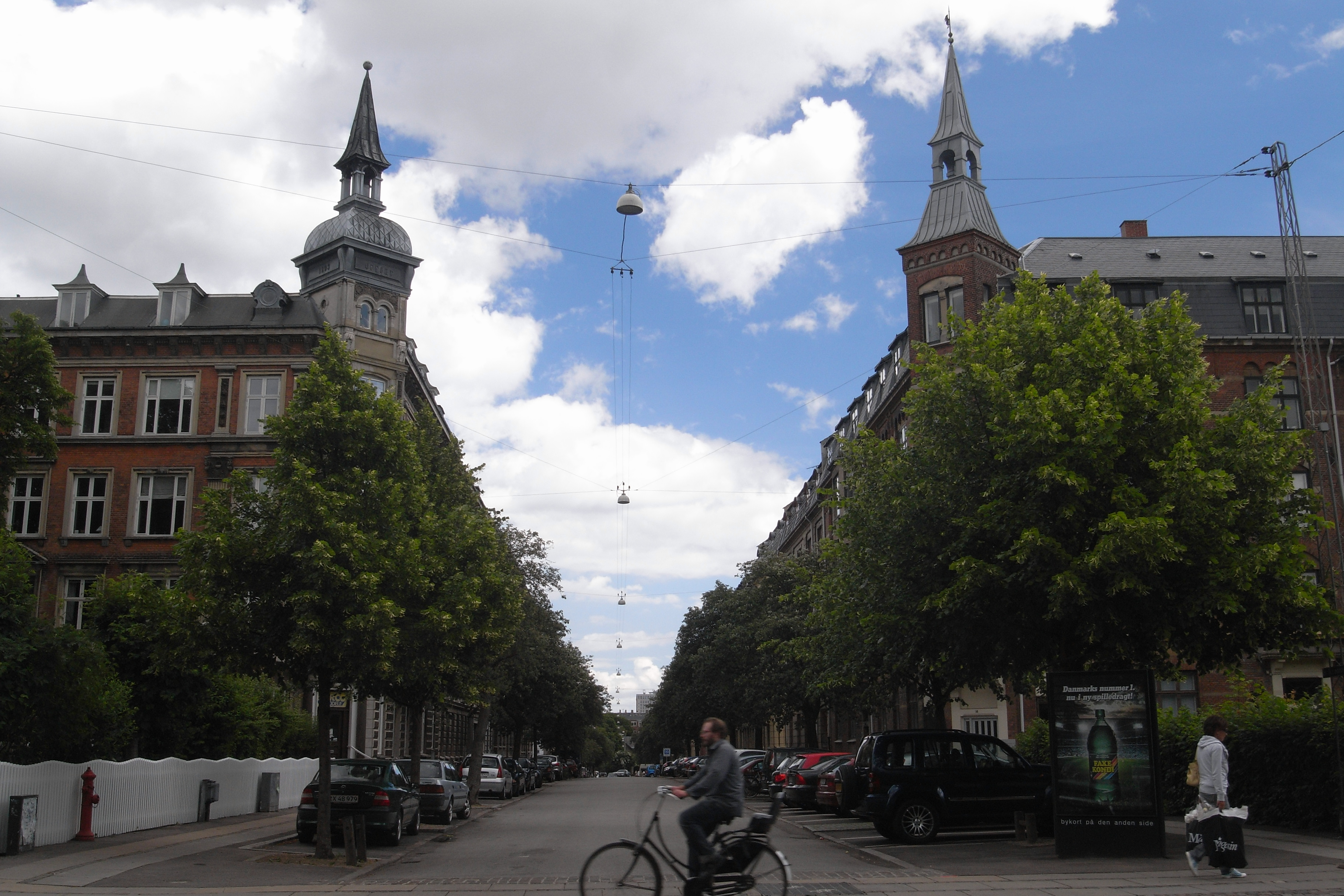
A view down Hollændergade from Allégade

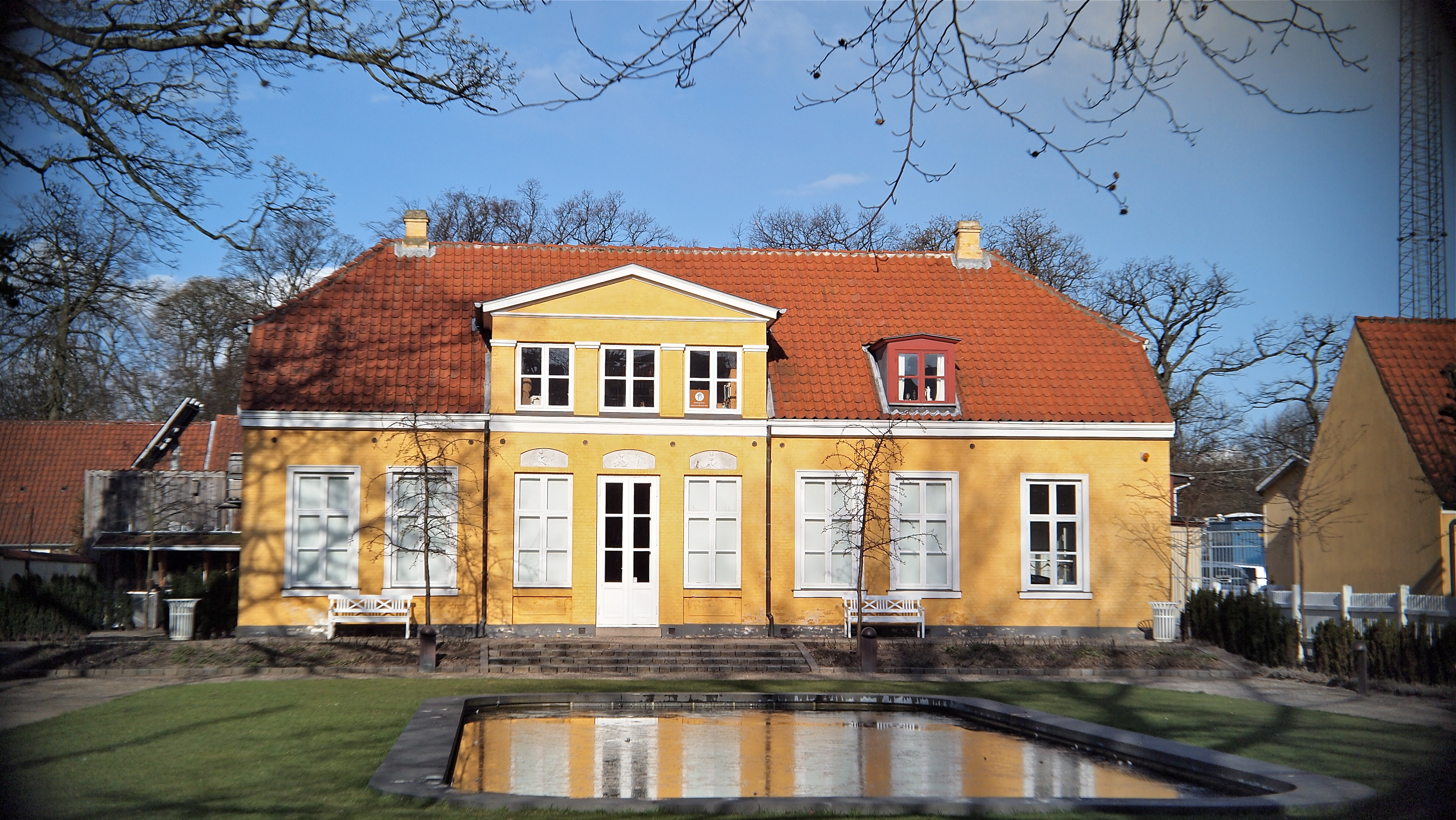
Riises Landsted, now Danish Revue Museum

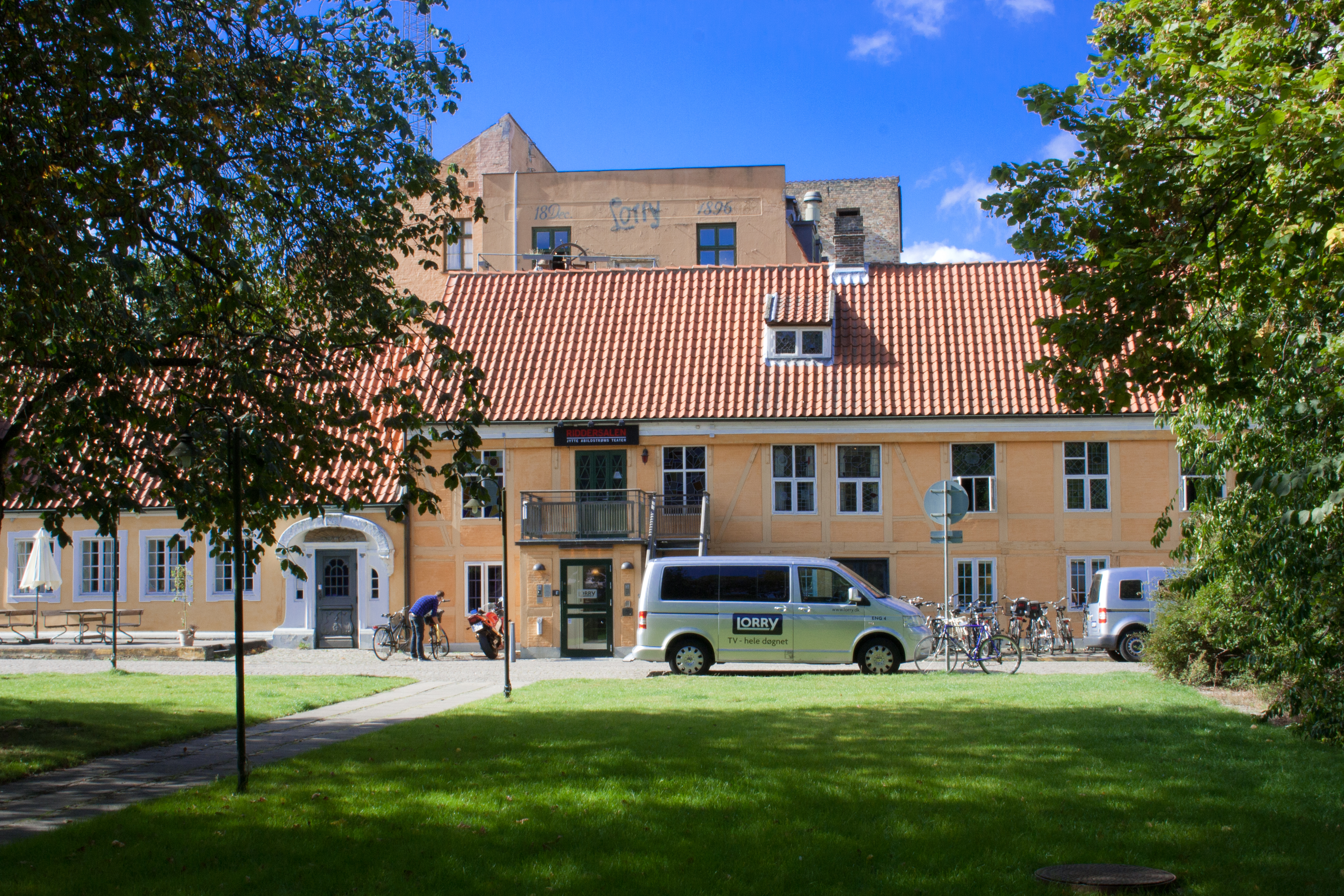
Lorry

Several of the country houses that were built along the street in the 18th and 19th century are still there today. Møllmanns landsted (No. 6) was built between 1750 and 1753 for Magnus Møllmann, a textile merchant, probably to a design by Philip de Lange. It is in one storey and a Mansard roof and has polygonal projections from the sides and Baroque details on the gables. The design resembles that of Store Mariendals in Hellerup. In 1794, a new building on the street closed the site off, hiding the house from the street. Ludvigs Minde at No. 22 was built by Chief Surveyor Johan Jørgen Berner after he had purchased two of the original farms and merged them into one property. He built two houses on the estate, one for himself and his family and one for summer boarders from Copenhagen. Riises Landsted ("Riise's Country House"), is a Neo-Classical country house from 1860. It now houses the Danish Revue Museum.

The building complex now known as Lorry is a former entertainment venue which traces its history back to 1834. It now contains TV2's local television station for the Copenhagen area and a small theatre, Riddersalen.

No. 4 (1850) and No. 10 (1853) are also listed.

== Digterlunden ==
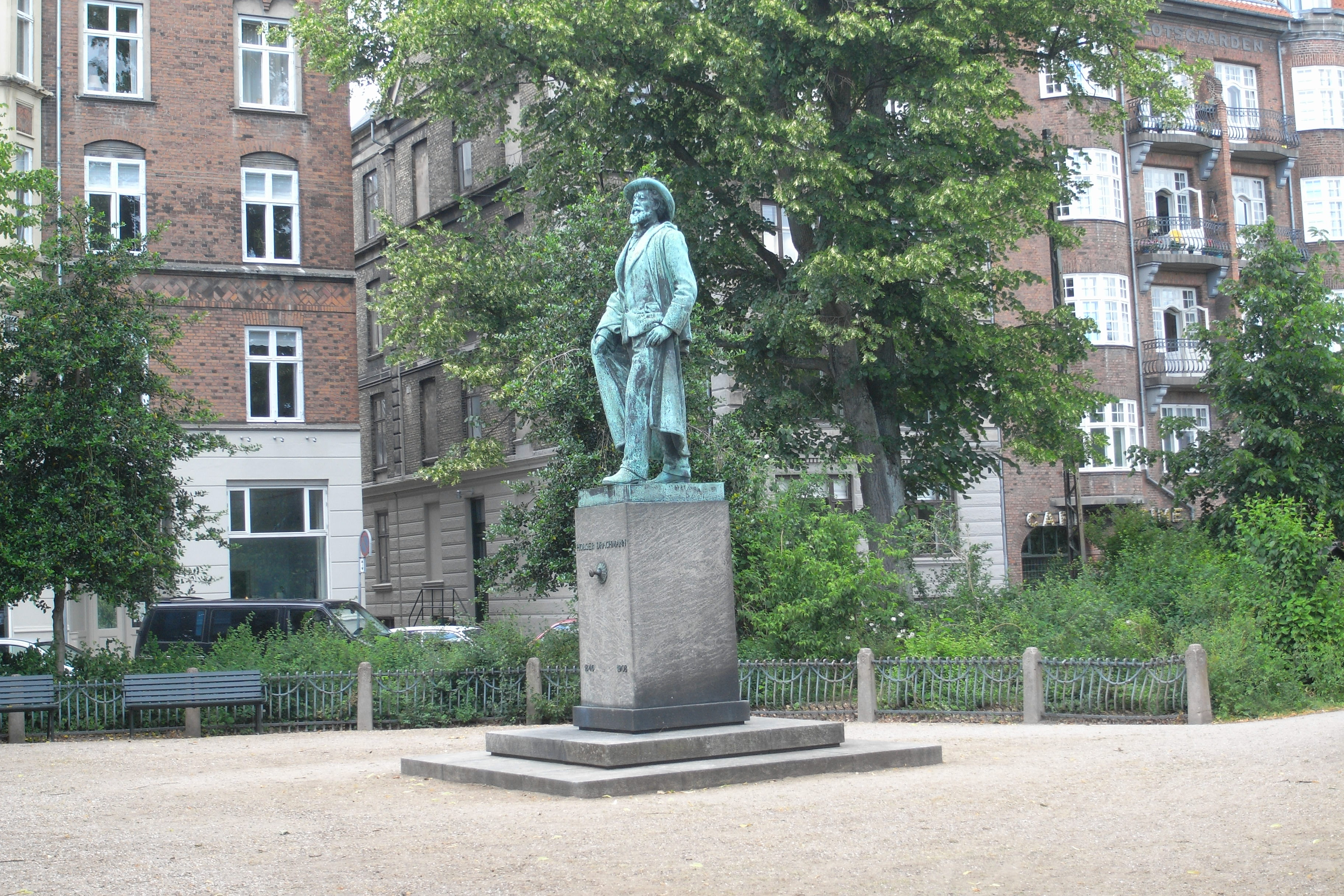
The Holger Drachmann statue at the north end of Allégade, facing Town Hall Square

Digterlunden ("Poets' Grove) is a narrow, rectangular garden complex at the northern end of Allégade, on its west side, just south of the Town Hall Square. It consists of four sections with different vegetation and each featuring an artwork depicting a poet with associations to Frederiksberg.

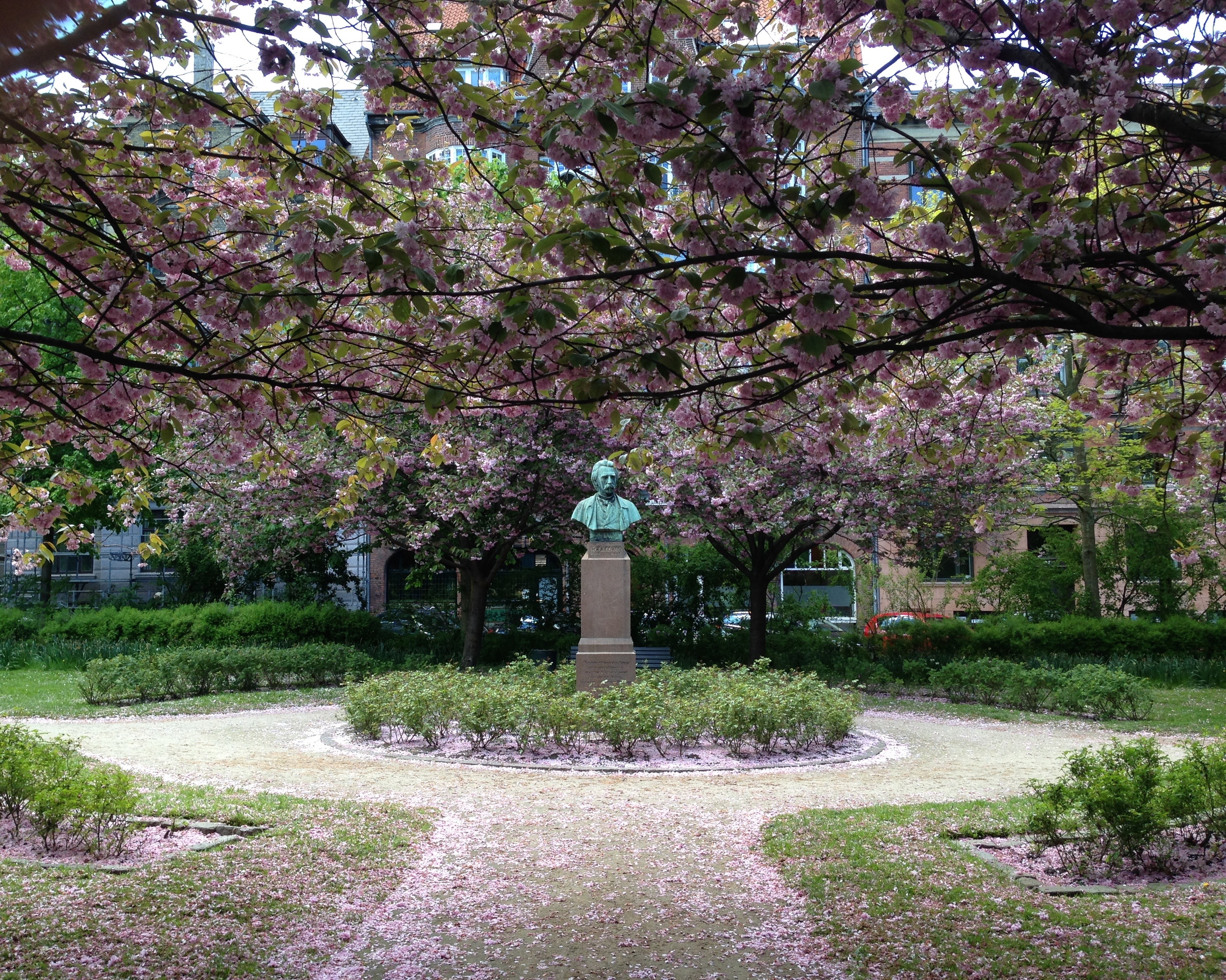
Aksel Hansen's bust of H. V. Kaalund

The largest of the four artworks is a statue of Holger Drachmann. It was created by Hans Christian Holter who only produced few works due to his early death. Drachmann was a frequent guest at the Lorry establishment where a restaurant was posthumously named after him. The three other artworks are busts. Gottfred Eickhoff's bust of Henri Nathansen faces the Drachmann statue. The two other busts, depicting Meïr Aron Goldschmidt and Hans Vilhelm Kaalund respectively, both face the traffic.
