= TV 2 Play =

Danish television channel

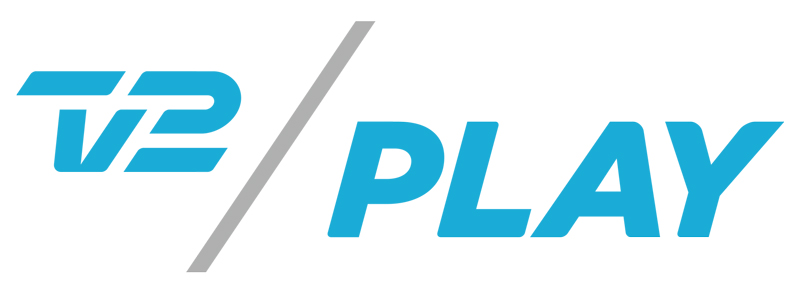
TV 2 Play logo

Second logo as TV 2 Sputnik until 2012

First logo as TV 2 Sputnik

TV 2 Play is a Danish TV 2 on demand channel, launched in 2012. It replaced TV 2 Sputnik (established in 2004), which was a joint operation with Nordisk Film. This service rebroadcasts programs from TV 2, TV 2 Echo, TV 2 Charlie, TV 2 Fri, TV 2 Sport, TV 2 News and TV 2 Sport X, as well as additional sports streams.

This is a paid channel, and is only broadcast on the Internet.
