= TV 2 Zulu =

- Country: Denmark
- Broadcast area: Denmark
- Network: TV 2 Denmark
- Headquarters: Copenhagen, Denmark

Programming
- Picture format: 16:9

Ownership
- Owner: TV 2 Denmark
- Sister channels: TV 2 TV 2 Charlie; TV 2 Fri; TV 2 News; TV 2 Sport

History
- Launched: 15 October 2000; 25 years ago
- Closed: 27 March 2023; 3 years ago
- Replaced by: TV 2 Echo

Links
- Website: zulu.dk

TV 2 Zulu was a Danish television station and a sister channel to TV 2 Denmark. It was primarily aimed at viewers between 15 and 30 years of age.

The channel was created in order to increase TV 2's market penetration, offering "high-quality series", in contrast to TVDanmark.

TV2 Zulu has been noted for Danish comedy shows and programmes such as Langt fra Las Vegas, Gustne Gensyn, P.I.S., Klovn and FC Zulu, the latter of which was nominated for an International Emmy in 2005 for best Non-scripted Entertainment. From 2000 to 2007, TV2 Zulu broadcast live NFL games.

TV2 Zulu was also known for its award shows such as Zulu Awards and Zulu Comedy Galla. Zulu Comedy Galla is a part of Zulu Comedy Festival, where comedians, both Danish and foreign, are performing in the capital of Denmark, Copenhagen. In 2011 it was introduced that comedians would also be performing in Aarhus. During the festival, the TV channel also broadcasts much comedy.

In the summer TV2 Zulu toured Denmark with an outdoor cinema, Zulu Sommerbio (Zulu Summercinema). In the cinema you get access to newly released movies for free, and in the meantime on the TV channel, TV2 Zulu broadcast movies, sorted by themes for the different weeks. Every place Zulu Sommerbio visits they stay 3–5 days, and on the last day, the audience got to decide the last movie, via a vote on the television stations website.

On satellite, TV 2 Zulu (as well as TV 2 Charlie and TV 2 Film) was initially exclusively available via Canal Digital. The competing Viasat platform started broadcasting the channels in January 2009.

TV 2 Zulu closed on 27 March 2023, and was replaced by TV 2 Echo.
