= Tommy Zwicky =

Danish journalist and television presenter

- Occupations: Journalist, television presenter
- Years active: 2003–present

Tommy Zwicky is a Danish journalist and television presenter. He is known for hosting the popular children's show Ultra Nyt, on DR Ultra. He is the current editor-in-chief of TV Midtvest.

== Career ==
=== Journalism and television ===
He attended the Danish School of Media and Journalism 2001–2005, where he received the highest possible grade (13) for his thesis. Zwicky started his media career as freelancer journalist on TV 2 News in 2003. He has worked as a journalist for several Danish language channels including DR, TV 2 News, DR Ultra, TV Midtvest, Kanal 5, Nickelodeon, among many others.

He has directed and hosted the first daily news program for children, Ultra Nyt, in Denmark. The program won Best new program award (non-fiction) at TV Prisen, in 2014. Additionally, he was part of the teams that won "Best Children´s program" 2011 and "Best entertainment" 2016.

=== Huawei controversy ===
Zwicky had worked in the Huawei's Danish office as the vice president of communications for seven months. He announced on Twitter that he has resigned his position. The announcement comes after it was revealed in The Washington Post, that Huawei has tested a face recognition technology that has been able to identify Uighurs, the predominantly Muslim minority group that Chinese authorities have detained by the hundreds of thousands in reeducation camps.
