= TV 2 Nyhederne =

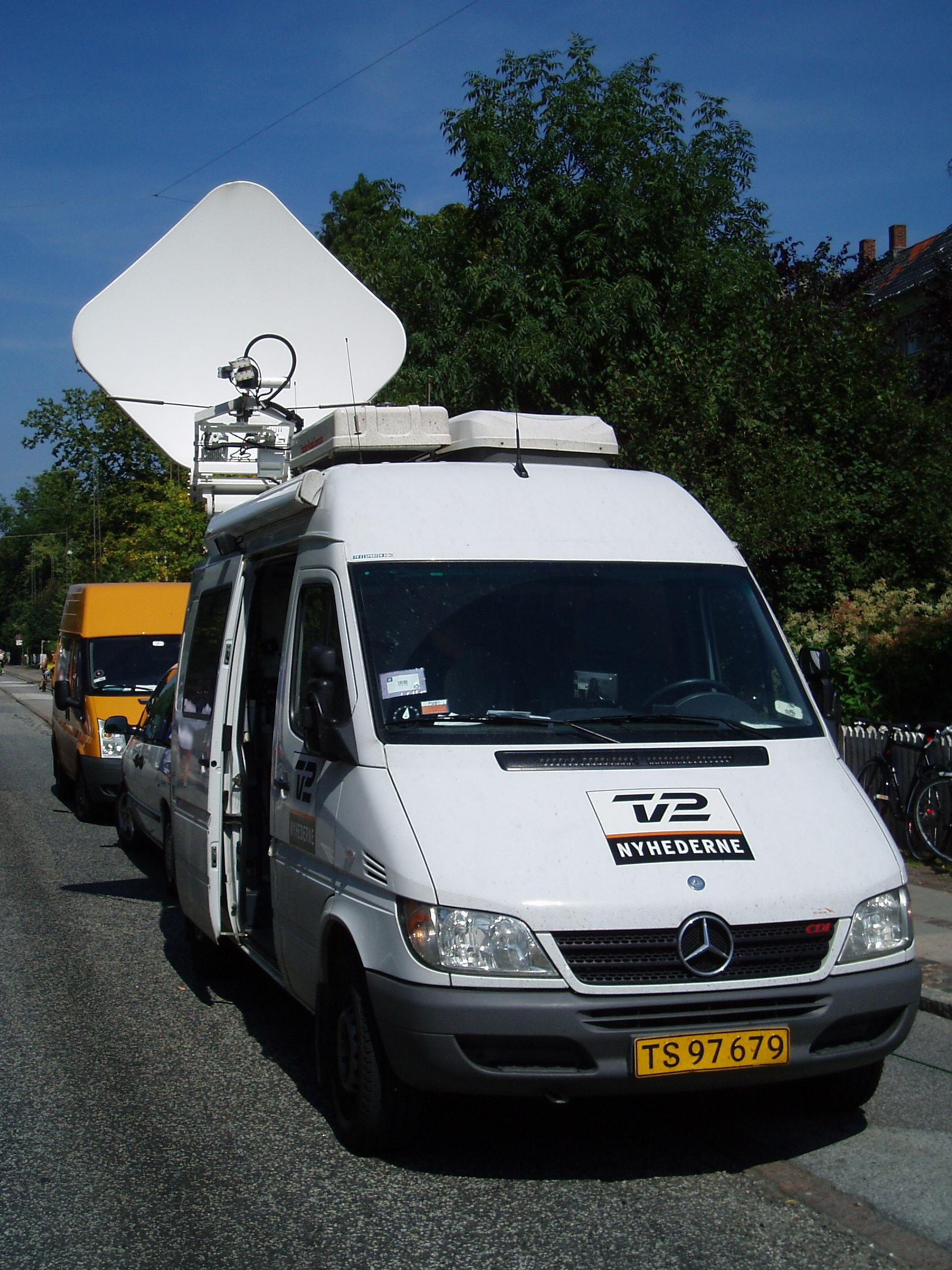
TV 2 news van

TV 2 Nyhederne (often stylized as TV 2/NYHEDERNE; or since 2023, just "News") is the name given to TV 2's news team and news service. TV 2 Nyhederne produces daily news bulletins of a varying length and nature. In addition, TV 2 Nyhederne also produces news items and content for cellphones, internet and teletext, as well as documentaries and breaking news reports.

TV 2 Nyhederne has a wide-ranging service, from local affairs to world events, every day of the week, inside and outside Denmark's borders.

== History ==
When TV 2 launched in October 1988, the director of the time placed the main bulletin at 7:30pm, competing with TV Avisen on DR. This did not click well with viewers, and TV 2 moved the national bulletin to 7pm, followed by new regional programmes at 7:28pm, two minutes ahead of TV Avisen, in order to surpass it in ratings. Three years after launch, TV 2 Nyhederne became Denmark's most watched news service, a position it held until 2008, when the 9pm edition of TV Avisen surpassed the 7pm edition of TV 2 Nyhederne in terms of viewers. In 2009, the 7pm bulletin on TV 2 regained its position, surpassing the competing DR1 bulletin. A late bulletin (at 10pm) was added in 1992.

The current airtimes are at 5pm with 12 minutes, 6pm with 20 minutes, 7pm with 25 minutes and 9:30pm with 15 minutes, totalling 72 minutes per day. TV 2 News simulcasts its morning and noon bulletins with TV 2.

Among its scandals were two reports in July 2005 on a supposed organised gang of immigrants named Triple A, which was reported as a top story, but was later revealed to be fake. TV 2 Nyhederne later removed the report from its platforms and had to pay DKK 75.000 in damages to a person who appeared in the reports. The Radio and TV Council declared that the reports violated requisits of objectivity and impartiality in the dissemination of informations to which TV 2 was subject to, and its leader Lotte Mejlhede resigned following this episode.

The channel decided to move its 10pm bulletin (22 Nyhederne) to 9:30pm (21.30 Nyhederne) from 28 January 2019 in order to optimize its news resources. The new bulletin provided a faster tone as well as additional stories not covered in the early evening bulletins. This was part of a broader plan to obtain more resources to produce Danish fiction and documentaries for the primetime period, attractive genres for its streaming service, TV 2 Play.

In October 2023, the news operation was simply renamed News.The purpose of the relaunch was due to the move of the bulletins to TV 2 News, creating a unified television news department. Until then, TV 2 and TV 2 News had their own departments. With the changes, the three corse bulletins on the main TV 2 channel were renamed as such:

- ’18 Nyhederne’ became ’18 News’
- ’19 Nyhederne’ became ’19 News’
- ’21.30 Nyhederne’ became ’21.30 News’

== Presenters ==
- Mikael Kamber
- Cecilie Beck
- Miriam Zesler
- Poul Erik Skammelsen
- Ditte Haue
- Troels Mylenberg

Editor-in-Chief:

- Thomas Funding
