= Lorry, Frederiksberg =

Entertainment venue in Frederiksberg, Denmark

Coordinates: 55.6759°N 12.5316°E

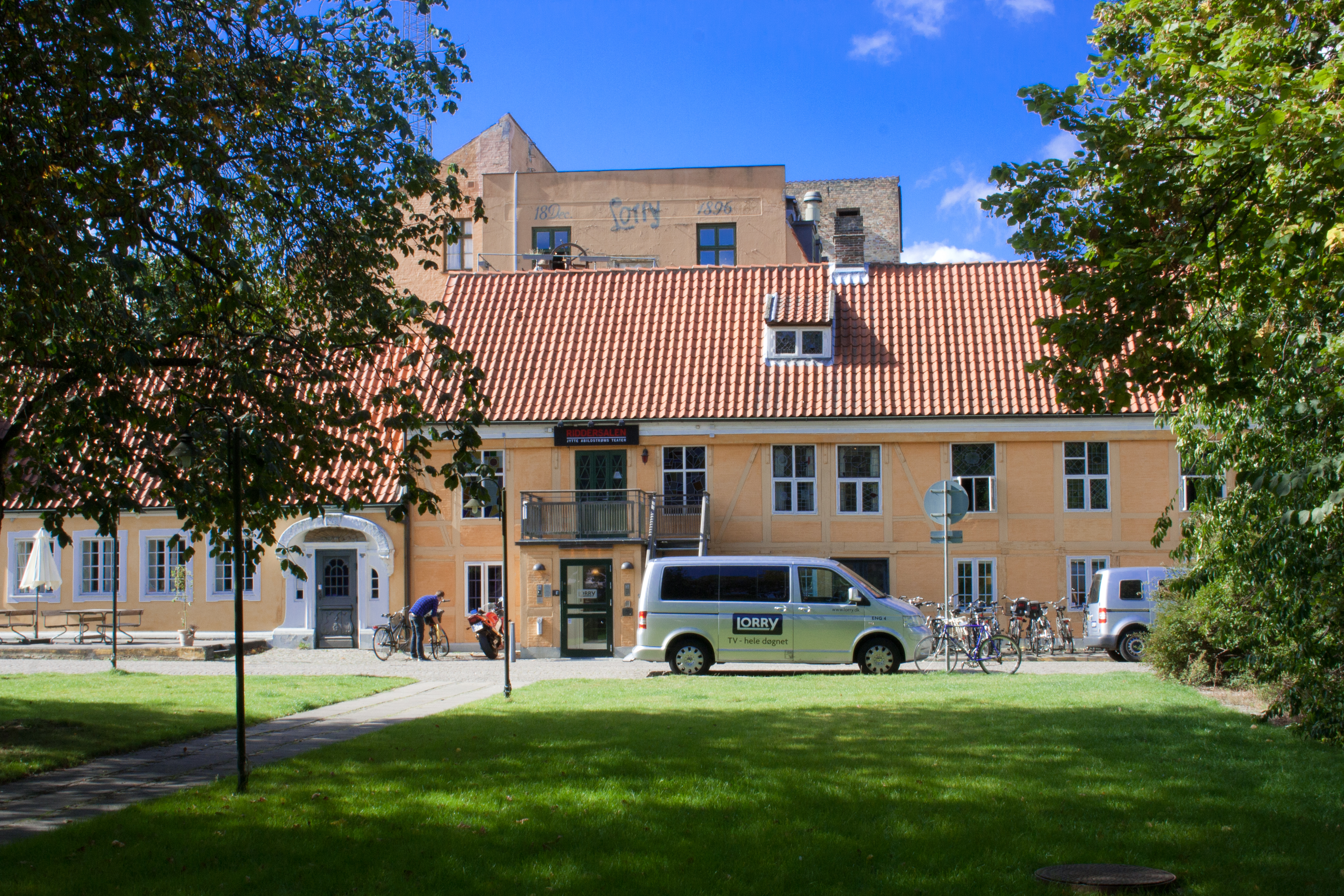
9 Allégade, now housing TV2/Lorry's television studios

Lorry is a former entertainment venue in the Frederiksberg district of Copenhagen, Denmark. Its history as an entertainment venue goes back to 1834 when the country house Enighedslyst was converted into a tea garden. The name refers to a later owner, Frederik Laurentius Feilberg, who was popularly known as Lorry. The listed building complex now houses TV 2 Kosmopol (formerly TV2/Lorry), TV2's local news station for the Copenhagen area; a small theatre, Riddersalen; and a café.

== History ==
=== Haabet ===
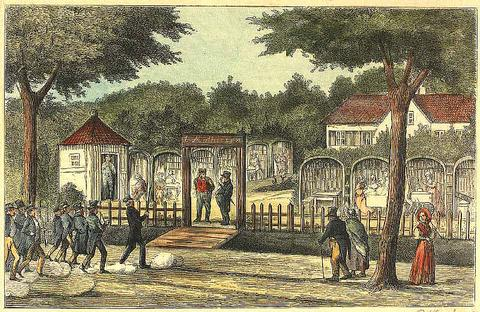
Students arriving at the entertainment venue at Allégade 7 in 1874

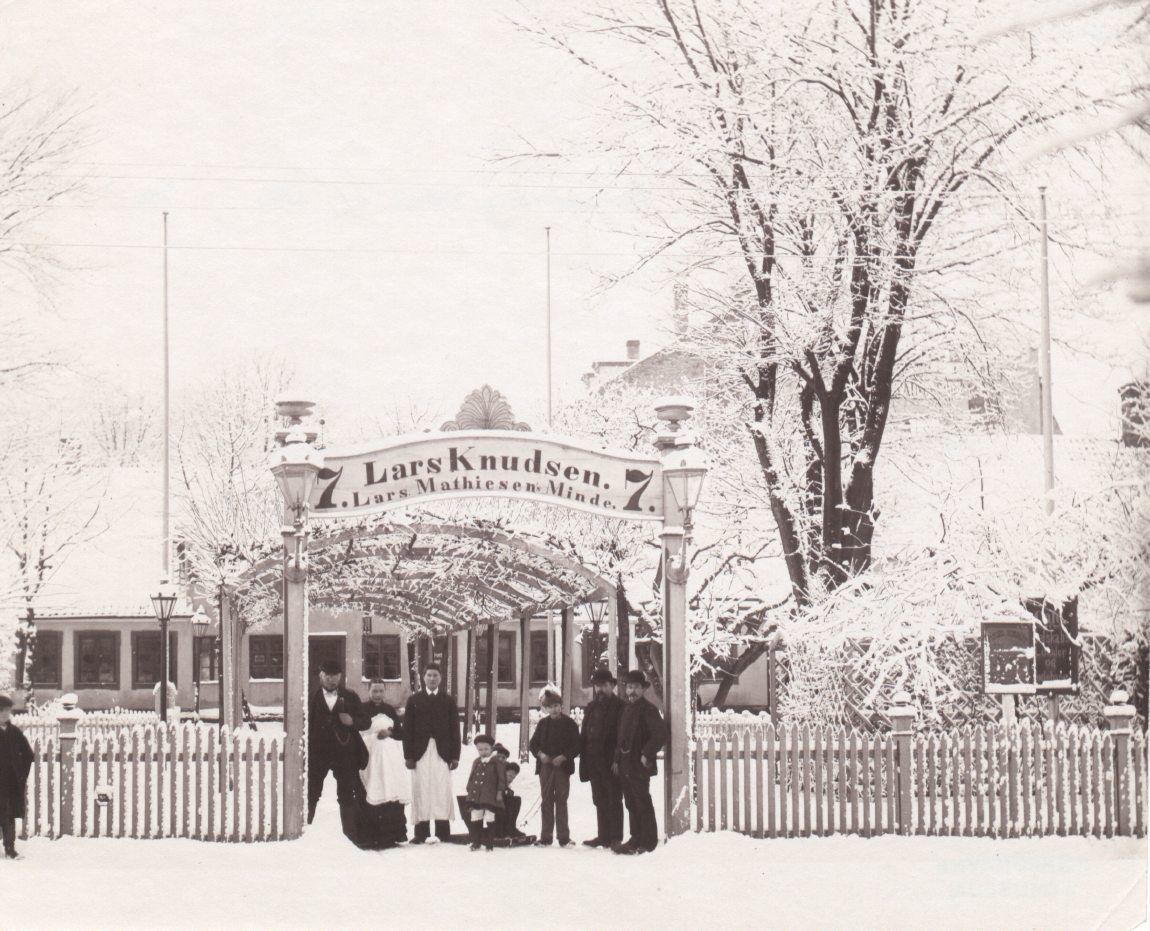
The patron and staff photographed in front of Lars Mathiesens Minde in circa 1885

The property Haabet (The Hope, now No. 7) was on 31 March 1804 purchased by Lars Mathiesen from steward at Frederiksberg Palace Marcus Friederich Voigt. On 27 February that same year he had been granted a royal license to open a guesthouse and beer garden at the site. Mathiesen ran the establishment for 50 years. It attracted a wide range of common and more cultivated guests and was a particularly popular venue for both large and small student gatherings. Mathiesen was a jovial and popular character who as he grew old was almost seen as the uncrowned king of Frederiksberg. His literary acquaintances comprised Knud Lyhne Rahbek and Adam Oehlenschläger. In 1829, Oehlenschläger even rented a summer residence in Haabet's backyard.

Haabet was after Mathiesen's death continued under the name Lars Mathiesens Minde (Lars Mathiesen's Memory).

=== Café Chantant ===
Lorry's history as an entertainment venue goes back to 1834 when the country house Enighedslyst was converted into a tea garden. In the mid-1860s it became an entertainment venue where female singers performed in front of an audience consisting mainly of local craftsmen. The restaurateur Carl Kehlet took the place over in 1877 and his successful business enabled him to purchase the entire property. He turned the ground floor into a restaurant and moved the singing girls upstairs to Café Chantant, a new venue on the first floor. The establishment gradually began to attract a larger audience. Among the well-known guests were the writer and painter Holger Drachmann, who found his muse, Edith, among the singers.

=== Feilberg's venues ===
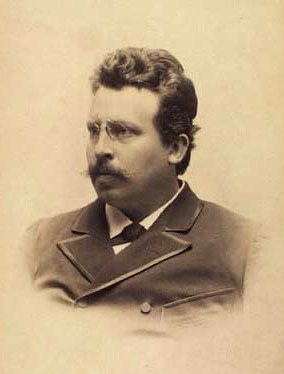
Lorry Feilberg

In 1896, Kehlet sold his establishment to Frederik Laurentius Feilberg, known as Lorry, who named it after himself. He changed the name of Café Chantant into Operetten. The tradition with singing girls was discontinued in 1914 when Operetten was renamed Riddersalen (English: The Knight's Hall). It served as a venue for cabarets. In 1909 and 1913, he acquired two neighbouring buildings for expanding his entertainment establishment.

In 1910, he expanded the ground floor into a new venue, Landsbyen (English: The Village). The interior walls were painted as facades of half-timbered farmhouses and there were a forge, a farmer's kitchen and a well while the stage resembled a horse carriage. The audience was seated at small tables spread out across the floor.

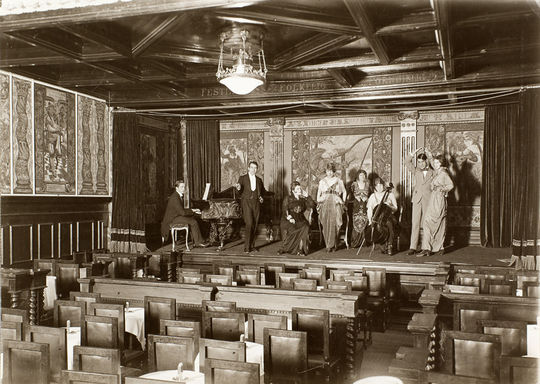
Riddersalen in the 1910s

In 1913, Kehlet opened Drachmenn Kroen (English: The Drachmann Inn), a large popular restaurant named after Drachmann who had died in 1909. The room was decorated with a series of paintings by Aksel Jørgensen which incorporated Drachmann and Edith in scenes from Drachmann's works. Feilberg also had plans to convert it into an elegant hall where afternoon guests could have tea accompanied by subtle music while it could be rented out for private celebrations in the evening. However, due to an illness which prompted him to sell, Feilberg never put his plans through but they were realized by his successor, Valdemar Nielsen, who opened Guldaldersalen (English: The Golden Age Hall).

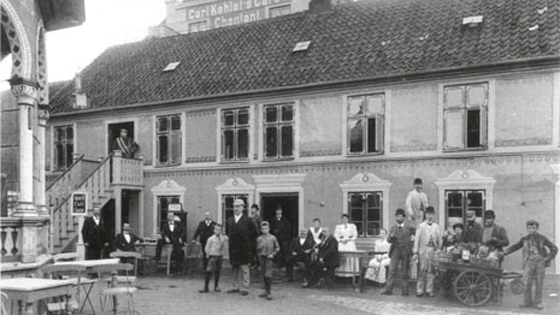
The main building

The Landsbyen venue saw another expansion in 1929. The decorations were adapted to resemble tyrolean houses with balconies and murals of snow-capped mountains painted on the rear walls. An expansion of the stage created room both for an orchestra and soloists. The inspiration was Haus Vaterland on Potsdamer Platz in Berlin.

=== After World War II ===
In 1945, Landsbyen was hit by Schalburgtage but it was rebuilt just a few months later. Over the following decades, it remained a popular venue, attracting family excursions in the afternoon and international performances in the evenings, but with the advance of television and new habits, it ultimately lost its audience and closed in 1976. After a few years, Frederiksberg Municipality acquired the buildings and put them through a comprehensive refurbishment, yet attempts to revive the place as a venue for popular entertainment remained unsuccessful.

== Today ==
TV2/Lorry rented the complex from its establishment and purchased it from Frederiksberg Municipality in 1999. They now have their television studios in Landsbyen while Guldaldersalen and Drachmann Kroen serve as editorial rooms.

Riddersalen is a theatre. It has been run by Jytte Abildstrøm since 1970.

Dating from 1881, 11 Allégade now houses a café, Café Grock.

== See also ==
- Frederiksberg Allé
- Danish Revue Museum
