= TV2 Øst =

TV 2/Øst
- Headquarters: Vordingborg

History
- Launched: January 2, 1991; 35 years ago

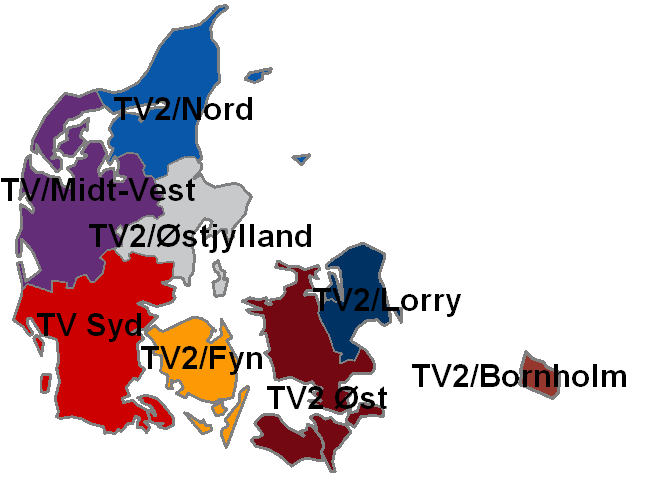
The TV 2 regions.

TV2 ØST is a public service television station, which covers West and South Sealand, as well as Lolland-Falster (the former Storstrøms County and Vestsjællands County).

Its local news programmes can be seen two times a day on TV 2's frequencies. TV2 ØST's most watched programme is the 7:30pm bulletin. The station delivers news and related content via its website, apps, RSS, podcasts, teletext, Facebook and Instagram. TV2 ØST operates as an independent company and is sustained by license fees. The station is based in Vordingborg. In the past, it had an office in Holbæk.

== History ==
=== 1990s ===
The channel started broadcasting on 2 January 1991 with Ole Dalgaard as its director, with emphasis on fiction and acquired foreign series. Reception was warm among viewers, who could finally see a regional newscast.

After Peter Harms Larsen became its director in 1992, its focus changed to news and reports. The channel increased its viewing share, and in 1997 and 1998, it was the most watched regional channel. Due to a fall in advertising revenue, the channel had to cut its staff in 1999.

=== 2000s ===
In 2004, production company East Production waas established, but as a result of the media agreement established in 2007, the channel was forced to sell the company in 2008. From 11 January 2012, TV ØST started a 24-hour schedule, up until then, its airtime was limited.

=== 2010s ===
==== Rename ====
TV ØST changed its name on 2 September 2014 from TV2 ØST to TV ØST, in order to remove the number 2 to strengthen its identity as an independent station. On 8 April 2019, the name was reverted to TV2 Øst, its former name. This came as part of a plan to convert it to a digital-first news entity.

==== Plans to build a media house ====
Since 2015, TV2 ØST has concentrated on regional content, in line with its plans to turn it into a media house.

After several attempts to turn TV2 ØST into a media house with emphasis on news items for internet social media platforms blev, a large restructuring hit the company in 2019. This raised concerns among staff, and, in the same year, industry paper Journalisten reported that TV2 ØST was affected by generalized lack of trust, sick connections and even crying in the halls. Several staff were left dissatisfied with the management, causing editor-in-chief Jesper Friis to resign from his post at TV2 ØST.

== Coverage area ==
TV2 ØST covers 12 of the 17 municipalities of Sealand: Odsherred, Holbæk, Kalundborg, Sorø, Slagelse, Ringsted, Stevns Faxe, Næstved, Vordingborg, Guldborgsund and Lolland.

The five remaining municipalities, Lejre, Roskilde, Køge, Solrød and Greve, are covered by TV 2 Kosmopol from Copenhagen.

== Directors ==
- Ole Dalgaard (1991-1992)
- Peter Harms Larsen (1992-1998)
- Vagn Petersen (1998-2022)
- Anette Kokholm (2022-2024)
- Ole Hampenberg Andersen (2024-)

== Famous staff ==
=== Journalist and writer ===
Among its most prominent staff was journalist and writer Jesper Clemmensen, who in 2012 won the prize for the Historical Book of the Year for Flugtrute Østersøen (2012). One of the chapters was used as the basis for the Danish-German documentary Flugten fra DDR from 2014.

=== From DR to TV Øst ===
Jeppe Nybroe, former presenter of TV-Avisen, worked at TV2 Øst in 2009-11; as a presenter and editor; Nybroe also wrote a book, Kidnappet - i islamisternes fangehul (2015).

== Popular programmes ==
The channel's primary function is the carriage of local news programmes. It also airs programmes on nature, food and culture as well as producing its own documentaries such as Kåres Danmarkshistorie with Kåre Johannessen from Middelaldercentret.

Other programmes include:

- Drømmejobbet
- Mit kæreste eje
- Præstens Lektie
- Vis mig din landsby
- Hvem er du?

== Events and other initiatives ==
TV2 Øst since the beginning has also engaged itself in local events, in order to diversify its efforts centered on news and current affairs. By taking part on events, it emphasizes community efforts and social interaction.

- In the 1990s, it was possible to take part in Club East, which offered access to local events and discount tickets, etc.
- TV2 Øst held TV ØST-løbet several times, among them in Ringsted and Næstved.
- TV2 Øst is also focused on social media platforms such as Snapchat. It also released advertisements for that initiative, which gained followers.
