= TV 2/Fyn =

- Headquarters: Odense

History
- Launched: January 10, 1989; 36 years ago

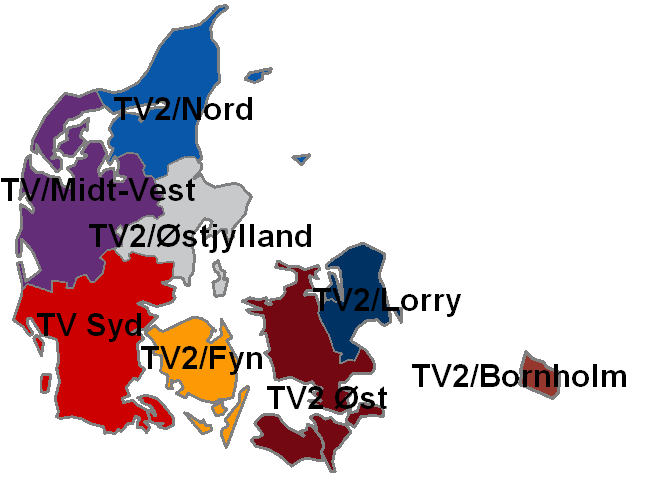
The TV 2 regions.

TV 2/Fyn is one of the eight regional television stations associated with TV 2/Danmark, covering the island of Funen.

It was the second TV 2 station established (after TV Syd) and started broadcasting on 10 January 1989. It was originally broadcasting from Odense, but moved to Svendborg in 1990 to differentiate TV 2/Fyn with the national TV 2 channel (which was also based from Odense). Originally, the station didn't broadcast any news, but as time went on it came to focus more on news. This prompted a move back to Odense and a new television house was opened in September 2000.

The regional TV 2 stations are given the time slots 18.10-18.20 and 19.30-20.00 every day of the week as well as 11.00-11.30,12.10-12.30 16.05-16.15 and 22.20-22.30 on weekdays (the late slot is not broadcast on Fridays). TV 2/Fyn use the afternoon, early evening and nightly slots for regional news. The 19.30 is the main regional news bulletin. The lunch slot starts with a local programme, followed by Set & Sket which is co-produced and simulcast by all TV 2 regions. This is followed by national news at noon and a lunch edition of the regional news.

The station is entirely funded by the television license. It does however sell regional advertising space in connection to the regional slots, but this revenue is not used for TV 2/Fyn, but for the national TV 2.
