= Radio 2 (Denmark) =

Danish radio station

Radio 2 was a Danish commercial cable radio station, founded by TV 2, hence the name. In its last years, it was owned by SBS Radio, who also owned The Voice.

== History ==
=== 1990s ===
The channel's name was a reference to TV 2/Danmark, who founded the station together with the then-Tele Danmark on 1 March 1997. Tele Danmark owned 70%, TV 2 25% and the Danish Red Cross the remainin 5% of its shares. The station was headquartered in Copenhagen and was presided by Hans Otto Bisgaard, with its news unit, Radio 2 Nyhederne, being produced at TV 2 Nyhederne's editing team in Odense.

The initial aim was to become the fourth national FM network in Denmark, but by being placed on cable TV networks, which at the time reached approximately half of the population, it quickly went clear that this couldn't be possible. Politically speaking, there was already a plan to give the allocation to DR in the summer of 1998, while the possibilities of giving the fifth allocation to a consortium of local radio stations was being examined.

The station had limited listening figures, despite having a substantial amount of hosts recruited from DR, among them Jørn Hjorting, Alex Nyborg Madsen, Monica Krog-Meyer, Michael Juul Sørensen and Georg Julin. The station's first annual budget reported a loss of kr. 37 million in the final result. The station had already been sold to American company Clear Channel Communications in spring 1998. In July 2003, Clear Channel sold it to SBS Broadcasting for the sum of kr. 130 million. Its music profile was adult contemporary with hits from the 1980s, 1990s and 2000s.

Besides cable and satellite, from 1999, Radio 2 started broadcasting from borrowed licenses in North Jutland, Randers, Aarhus, Fredericia, Helsingør, Copenhagen and Funen. This meant that Radio 2's stations across Denmark had different schedules and were obliged to air local news. On cable TV, the Copenhagen station was distributed.

=== 21st century ===
After being a pure music channel under Clear Channel's control between 1998 and 2003, the station was relaunched coinciding with the closure of POP FM in 2005, where Radio 2 inherited its frequencies. In this context, Radio 2 received programs with studio-based presenters for most of the day. Radio 2 and The Voice were, throughout its existence, competitors to DR's radio stations. However, in 2003, they were surpassed internally by Radio 100FM and Sky Radio.

SBS Radio shut down Radio 2 on 4 February 2008 being replaced by rock station Radio City, which eventually shut down in spring 2009. Most of Radio 2's transmitter network was given over to another SBS Radio station, Nova FM. In the same year that the transition from Radio 2 to Radio City took place, SBS Radio was in charge of another failed radio project, the expensive-profile TV 2 Radio, which, unlike Radio 2, had a national FM license (the former Sky Radio license).

SBS Radio and TV 2 | DANMARK A/S merged to create Radio 2 A/S, later RADIO NOVA A/S, in order to create a new radio project, where SBS controlled 70% of Nova FM and TV 2 the remaining part. Just like the original Radio 2, TV 2 | DANMARK A/S was responsible for Nova FM's news operation.

== Presenters ==
- Flemming Beck
- Jan Brodde
- Mikkel Elsgaard
- Henrik Foersom
- Jørn Hjorting
- Georg Julin
- Monica Krog-Meyer
- Nikolaj Vraa
- Michael Juul Sørensen
- Hans Otto Bisgaard
- Christina Leander
