= Mads Ellesøe =

Danish filmmaker and journalist

- Born: 1977 (age 48–49)
- Education: Danish School of Media and Journalism
- Occupations: journalist, filmmakerer

Mads Ellesøe (born 1977) is a Danish filmmaker and journalist.

He studied at Danish School of Media and Journalism.

In 2010, he was arrested by the Moroccan secret service, after doing a critical documentary about West Sahara issue.

He worked as journalist at the Danish newspaper Politiken and at Center For Investigative Reporting in the US.

Ellesøe have worked for International Media Support in South Sudan. Also, he was a director at the international documentaries unit at DR, the Danish Broadcasting Corporation, and before he was staff reporter in an investigative unit at Danish TV2.

Your film documentary The Men Who Plundered Europe received the Danish TV Award in 2019 as Best Documentary of the Year

== Selected filmography ==
- Our War (Danish film) (Danish: Vores Krig) (2009)
- Pind og Holdt i USA (2012)
- The Child Soldier's New Job (Danish: Børnesoldatens nye job) (2016)
- The Men Who Plundered Europe (Danish: Mændene der plyndrede Europa) (2018)
- The Campaign Against the Climate (2020)
