= TV 2 Kosmopol =

- Country: Denmark
- Broadcast area: Copenhagen
- Headquarters: Frederiksberg

Programming
- Language: Danish

Ownership
- Owner: Self-governing institution

History
- Launched: January 1, 1990

Links
- Website: tv2kosmopol.dk

TV 2 Kosmopol is a Danish television station headquartered in Frederiksberg, a municipality located entirely within Copenhagen, the national capital. The station employs 80 staff and covers an audience of 1.9 million viewers in the Capital Region of Denmark, excluding Bornholm, which is served by its own station. The station broadcasts from the former Lorry entertainment venue, from which the station took its former name.

== History ==
The channel was established in 1989. It did not air its programming until 1 January 1990, with the airing of its first news bulletin. The channel also produced specials in co-operation with SVT's Sydnytt, which caters the adjacent Swedish province of Scania. A combined team of four, two Swedes and two Danes, was set up in early November 2002, in a project initially headquartered in Copenhagen. The goal of the combined team was to produce items for Sydnytt which concerned both countries.

On 11 January 2012, conciding with the reconversion of MUX1 to high definition and the total encryption of TV 2's frequencies for its national network, TV 2 Lorry started broadcasting a 24/7 service.

In January 2015, Morten Kjær Petersen became its CEO and initiated a push to improve its public image, with its main obstacle being its name, which, over time, was perceived by members of the 25-55 demographic to be "slow and outdated". Beginning mid-2021, the channel entrusted &Co. / NoA for a rebranding operation that included a new name, in order to represent a more diverse, but still fragmented, part of the Danish population. For this end, &Co. developed the name Kosmopol, a portmanteau of metropol and kosmopolit. The rebrand took place on 11 January 2023. The new logo and graphics were devised by Urgent.Agency.

== See also ==
- TV 2
