= TV 2 Sport X =

- Country: Denmark
- Broadcast area: Denmark
- Network: TV 2 Denmark
- Headquarters: Copenhagen, Denmark

Programming
- Picture format: 16:9 (HDTV)

Ownership
- Owner: TV 2 Denmark
- Sister channels: TV 2 TV 2 Echo; TV 2 Charlie; TV 2 Fri; TV 2 News; TV 2 Sport

History
- Launched: 4 January 2020; 5 years ago

TV 2 Sport X is a Danish sports channel owned by TV 2. Announced in September 2019 and launched on 4 January 2020, it airs international sporting events to which TV 2 has the rights to. Originally a streaming channel, it became a linear television channel in 2020.

== History ==
The channel was created by TV 2 following the success of its sports coverage on TV 2 Play. TV 2 had already started a sports channel, TV 2 Sport, on linear television in 2015, and had quickly become the most successful sports channel in Denmark. The goal of the new channel was to accelerate the development of the streaming platform. At the time of its announcement, it gained the rights to air La Liga (three matches per week plus one El Clásico per season), Serie A (one match per week), Wimbledon and the newly-acquired rights to the men's ATP tournaments, NBA, X Games, the World Athletics Championship, biathlon, ski and others. The channel aimed to cater a younger demographic than TV 2 Sport. Negotiations with linear providers were underway.

The channel launched at 12pm on 4 January 2020. Up to eight events were also carried on TV 2 Play simultaneously from launch day. The channel on the streaming service and on subscription television companies was available in two subscription methods, one featuring the linear channel (with commercials) and one featuring overflow event coverage.

NFL coverage joined the channel with the recovery of TV 2's NFL rights in September 2024. Some of the weekly matches were carried there, but, depending on the week, it would air on TV 2 Sport instead.

== Criticism ==
On 21 November 2022, a TV 2 Sport X presenter, Jon Pagh, was outside a hotel in Qatar covering the World Cup when he was approached by the authorities. He was wearing a OneLove armband, perceived as a homossexual symbol (homossexuality is illegal in Qatar). He stayed in front of the hotel (where the Danish team stayed) for ten minutes and asked about the legality of the armband. He continued, thinking that they authorities were not real policemen. This happened on the same day of a major controversy, forbidding the local use of such armbands in stadiums in the competition.
