= Danish School of Media and Journalism =

- Danmarks Medie- og Journalisthøjskole
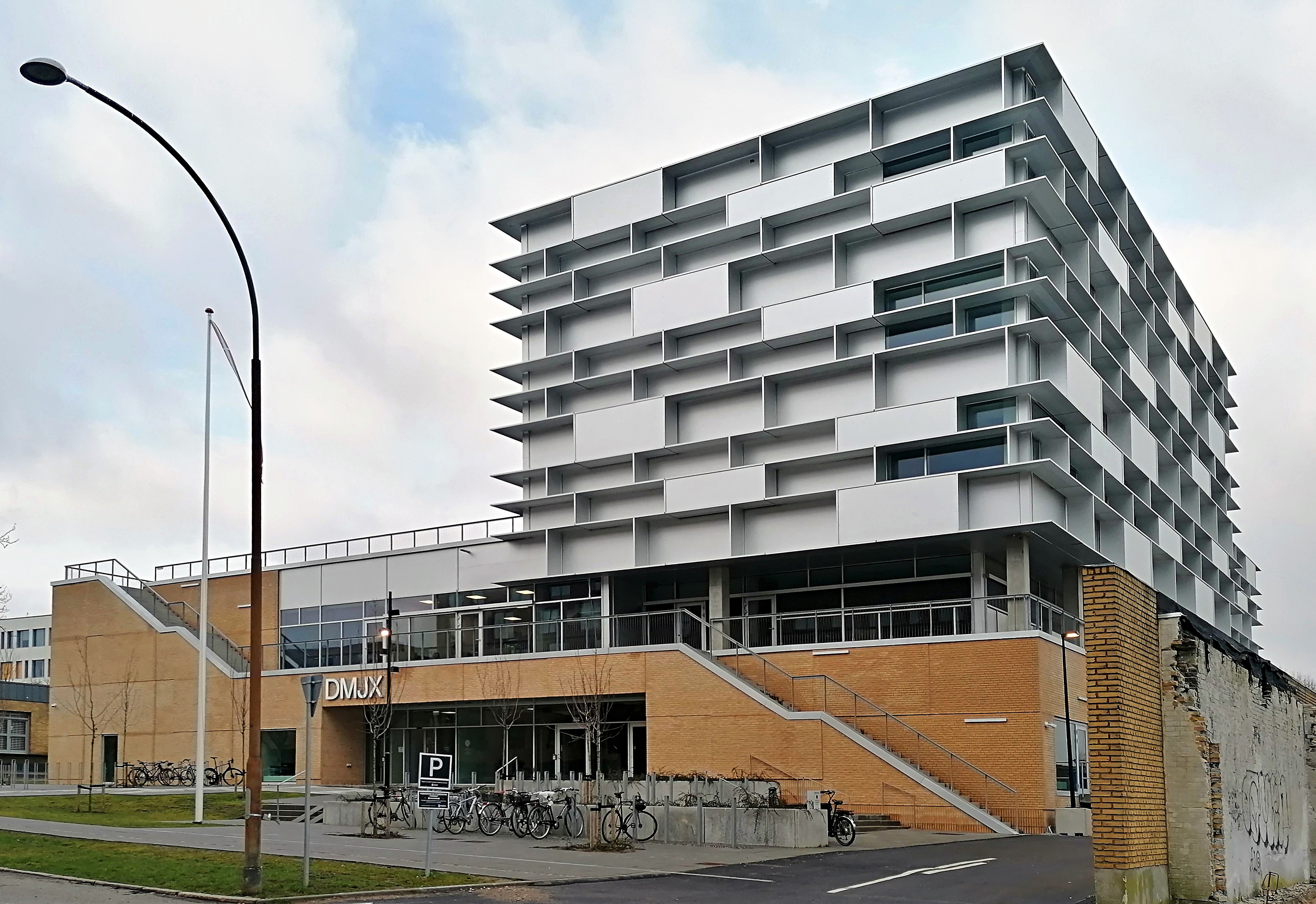
- Danish School of Journalism, the Aarhus campus of DMJX (Katrinebjerg)
- Established: 1 January 2008; 18 years ago
- Location: Aarhus and Copenhagen, Denmark; 56.1714°N 10.1933°E
- Campus: Katrinebjerg and Emdrup
- Language: Danish
- Website: http://www.dmjx.dk/

Danish School of Media and Journalism (Danish: Danmarks Medie- og Journalisthøjskole), or DMJX for short, is a Danish organization for higher education in, and a knowledge centre of, media and journalism. DMJX has two campuses; one in Copenhagen and one in Aarhus.

In 2004, DMJX and Aarhus University established the Centre for University Studies in Journalism, which offers master's courses at university level.

== Campuses ==
Danish School of Media and Journalism is a fusion of two formerly independent organizations and institutions in Aarhus and Copenhagen in January 2008. The Aarhus department is known as The Danish School of Media and Journalism (Danmarks Medie- og Journalisthøjskole, or DJH) and was established in 1946. In 1973, the school moved its address to Christiansbjerg, and it moved to its current location on Katrinebjerg in 2020. The Copenhagen department, situated in Ørestaden, is known as The Danish School of Media and Journalism (Danmarks Medie- og Journalisthøjskole, formerly Den Grafiske Højskole) and was established in 1943.

The Danish School of Journalism in Aarhus is the oldest and the largest educational institution of Denmark offering journalism courses. The school's former premises in the neighborhood of Christiansbjerg was built in 1973, designed by native architectural firm Kjær & Richter. It was situated next to the Aarhus department of Danmarks Radio in a large business district, Business Park Skejby.

== Notable alumni ==
- Natasja Crone Back
- Mads Ellesøe
- Tommy Zwicky
