= Odense University Hospital =

- Region of Southern Denmark
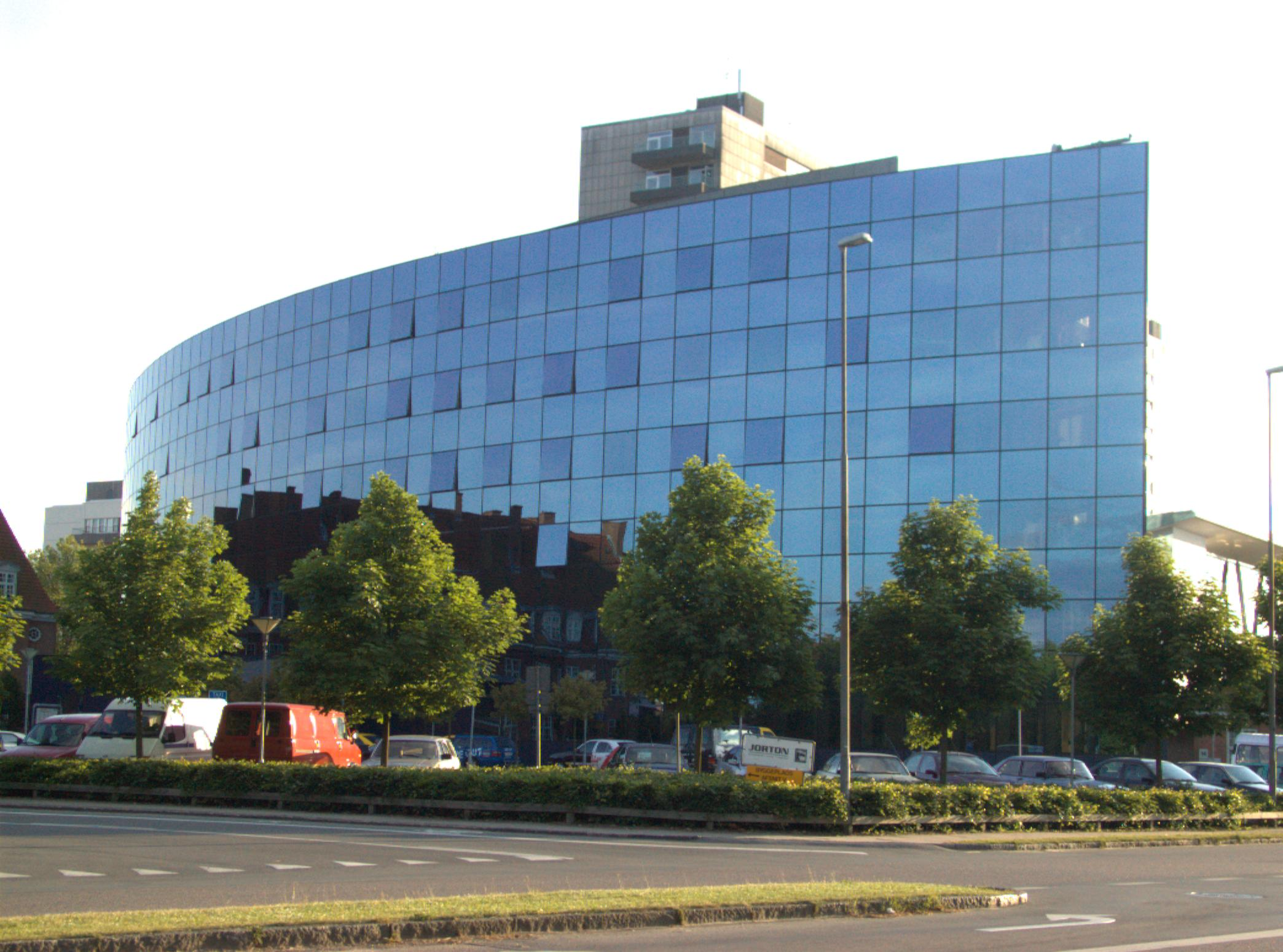
- Odense University Hospital's patient hotel, opened in 1997

Geography
- Location: Odense, Southern Denmark, Denmark
- Coordinates: 55°23′07″N 10°22′10″E

Organisation
- Type: General
- Affiliated university: University of Southern Denmark

Services
- Emergency department: Yes
- Beds: 1038

History
- Founded: 1912

Links
- Website: www.ouh.dk
- Lists: Hospitals in Denmark

Odense University Hospital (OUH) is a hospital in Southern Denmark.

OUH is both Odense's and Funen's largest single workplace (Odense Municipality employs significantly more, in multiple locations). It has a budget of 835 million euros and has 11.000 employees.

== Patient statistics ==
- 485.833 outpatient visits per. year (2006)
- Approx. 75.000 hospitalized patients, which together spend about 340,000 bed days per year (2006)
- Approx. 55.000 emergency room visits per year
