= TV 2 Echo =

- Country: Denmark
- Broadcast area: Denmark
- Network: TV 2 Denmark
- Headquarters: Copenhagen, Denmark

Programming
- Language: Danish
- Picture format: 16:9

Ownership
- Owner: TV 2 Denmark
- Sister channels: TV 2 TV 2 Charlie; TV 2 Fri; TV 2 News; TV 2 Sport; TV 2 Sport X

History
- Launched: 27 March 2023; 3 years ago
- Replaced: TV 2 Zulu

TV 2 Echo is a Danish television station which replaced TV 2 Zulu on 27 March 2023. It is primarily aimed at viewers between 20 and 30 years of age. It started in 2018 as a social media-based platform for young people before becoming a Television channel when it replaced TV 2 Zulu.

It holds its annual EchoPrisen awards every year since 2023, created as a replacement for the Zulu Awards from the channel's predecessor.
