= Hans Vilhelm Kaalund =

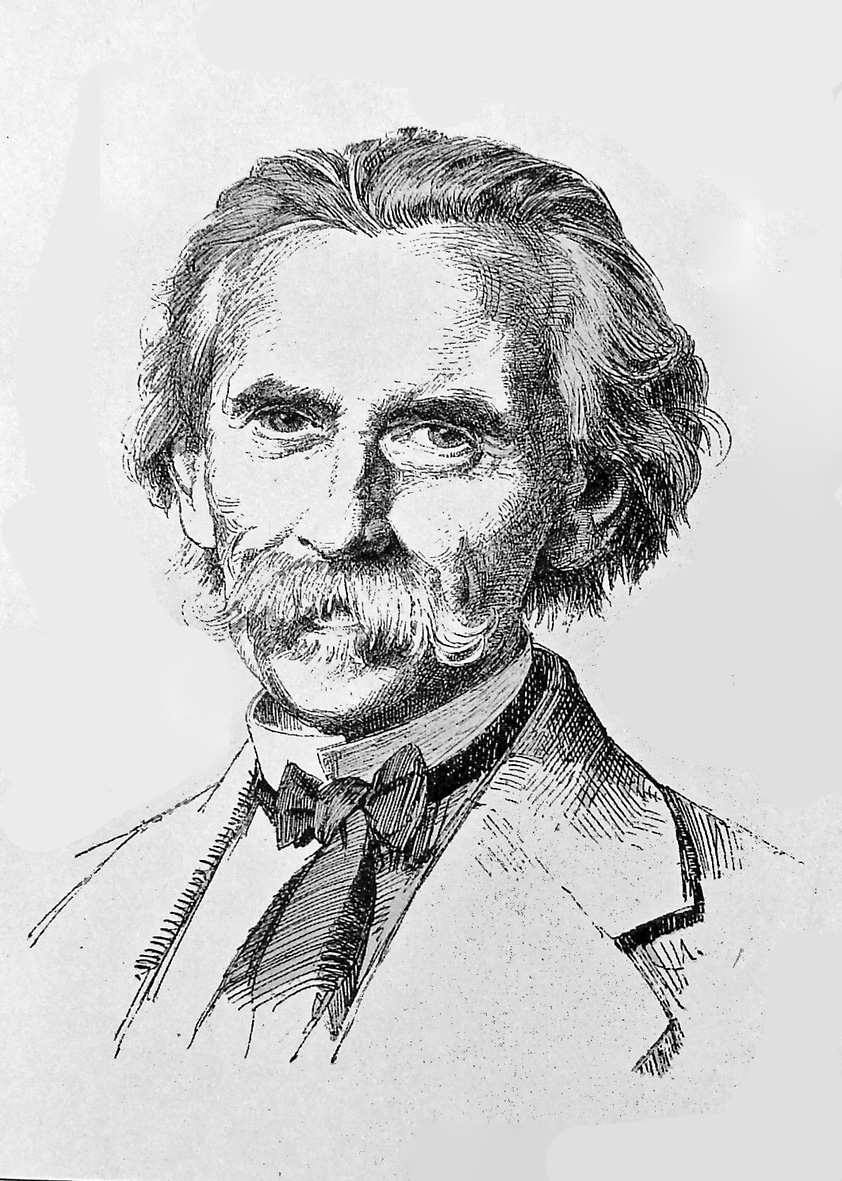
H.V. Kaalund

Hans Vilhelm (H. V.) Kaalund (27 June 1818 – 27 April 1885) was a Danish lyric poet.

== Early life ==
He was the son of a customs officer. He grew in the border district near the walls of Copenhagen. He studied sculpture and painting, but his early attempts to be an artist were interrupted by a nervous disorder. After working in various occupations, he took a position as a teacher at a prison, where he was able to write in his free time.

== Career ==
His verses on the return of Thorvaldsen (1838) were positively received and convinced him to take up literature as a profession. His poems, “Kong Haldan den Stœrke” (1840), and “Valkyrien Göndul” (1842), were successful but not profitable. The same was true of his other works until the publication of his lyrics in the book Et Foraar (“A Spring,” 1858), a collection of his best pieces. In 1875 his drama Fulvia appeared, and another collection of poetry, En Eftervaar (“An After-Spring”), appeared in 1877. Apart from love poetry and political statements, Et Foraar and En Eftervaar contain a lot of thought lyrics, perhaps his most important legacy.

A characteristic element in Kaalund's poetry is its demonstrative commitment to realities. Though a late romanticist, he continuously stresses the importance of building life upon a base of facts – without abandoning idealism. This is felt in poems like "Jeg elsker den brogede Verden" (“I love the colourful World” - 1858) and in his often sung "Paa det Jevne" (“On the Ground” - 1872). The latter was lauded as a typical Danish expression of matter-of-fact attitudes and criticised as just a typical lack of ambition. This split makes him a poet of transition between romanticism and realism. His best poems are still quoted.

Kaalund is known primarily for his Fabler for Børn (“Fables for Children,” 1845; illustrated by Johan Lundbye), a book of verses about animals. They are not fables, but small snapshots of animals. Some are sentimental, some humorous. The most famous is "Den dræbte And" - “The killed Duck”. Like the fairy tales of H. C. Andersen, they testify to the rising interest of children and nature in Danish literature and have several times been re-edited. Another collection for children was Fabler og blandede Digte (1844). Kaalund died 27 April 1885.

== Literature ==
- Bricka, Carl Frederik (1845). Dansk biografisk leksikon. Vol. 8. Begr. Cedergreen Bech, Svend. ISBN 87-01-77391-7. OCLC 256516867.
- Gilman, D. C.; Peck, H. T.; Colby, F. M., eds. (1905). "Kaalund, Hans Vilhelm" . New International Encyclopedia (1st ed.). New York: Dodd, Mead.
