= TV2 Bornholm =

TV 2/Bornholm
- Headquarters: Aakirkeby

History
- Launched: September 1, 1990; 35 years ago
- Former names: TV Bornholm (1990-2008)

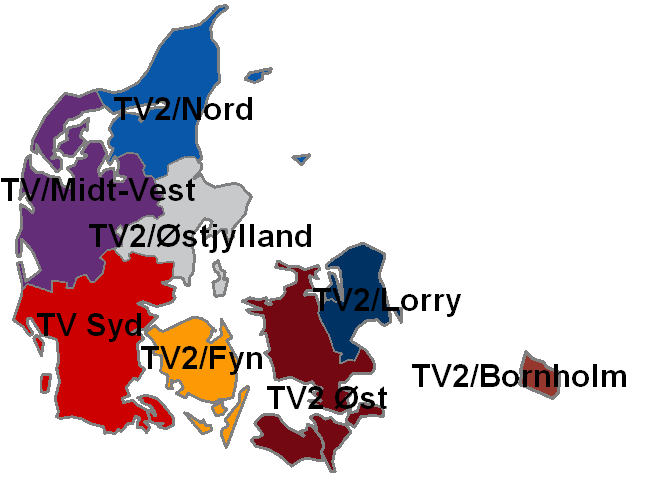
The TV 2 regions.

TV2 Bornholm is a regional TV station, part of the TV 2 network, which delivers news and current affairs programmes to Bornholm, the easternmost island of Denmark. The station is headquartered in Aakirkeby and has an estimated audience of 75,000 viewers.

== History ==
The station started broadcasting on 1 September 1990. An independent 24-hour channel started broadcasting on 11 January 2012, in line with the establishment of full-time channels on all of TV 2's regional stations. Its director was Jan Jørgensenbetween 1996 and 2024. He was replaced on his post by Camilla Kjems in September 2024.

In May 2025, its name changed from TV 2/Bornholm to TV2 Bornholm.

TV2 Bornholm produces the annual trolling competition Trolling Master Bornholm, which received criticism in its 2022 edition for disqualifying a father-son team, as the son was underage (age 11) and violated age regulations. Other events held by the station include Etape Bornholm and "Sol over Gudhjem".

== Ratings ==
Despite the decline in its ratings, TV2 Bornholm seems to have strong support among Bornholm's viewers - probably even larger than the other TV 2 regions. However, unlike the other stations, TV2 Bornholm cannot measure its ratings using Nielsens's measurements, considering that few Nielsen households exist in Bornholm for a more precise measurement. Jysk Analyse, instead, makes eleven user researches per year to evaluate the audience. The numbers are comparable every year, because the method is the same, but cannot be compared with the numbers given from audience measurements.

TV2 Bornholm's 7:30pm news bulletin (simulcast locally with TV 2's frequency) has, according yo Jysk Analyse figures from 2020, a share of just under 80%, while in 2024, it was of just over 60%. This means that nearly 60% of viewers in Bornholm are contacted for at least one second to watch the bulletin.

== Culture award ==
In 2010, TV2 Bornholm made a culture award for the first time. After an initial text message vote, Wonderfestiwall won it. The festival had previously bagged an award from the municipality's culture award.
