= TV Syd =

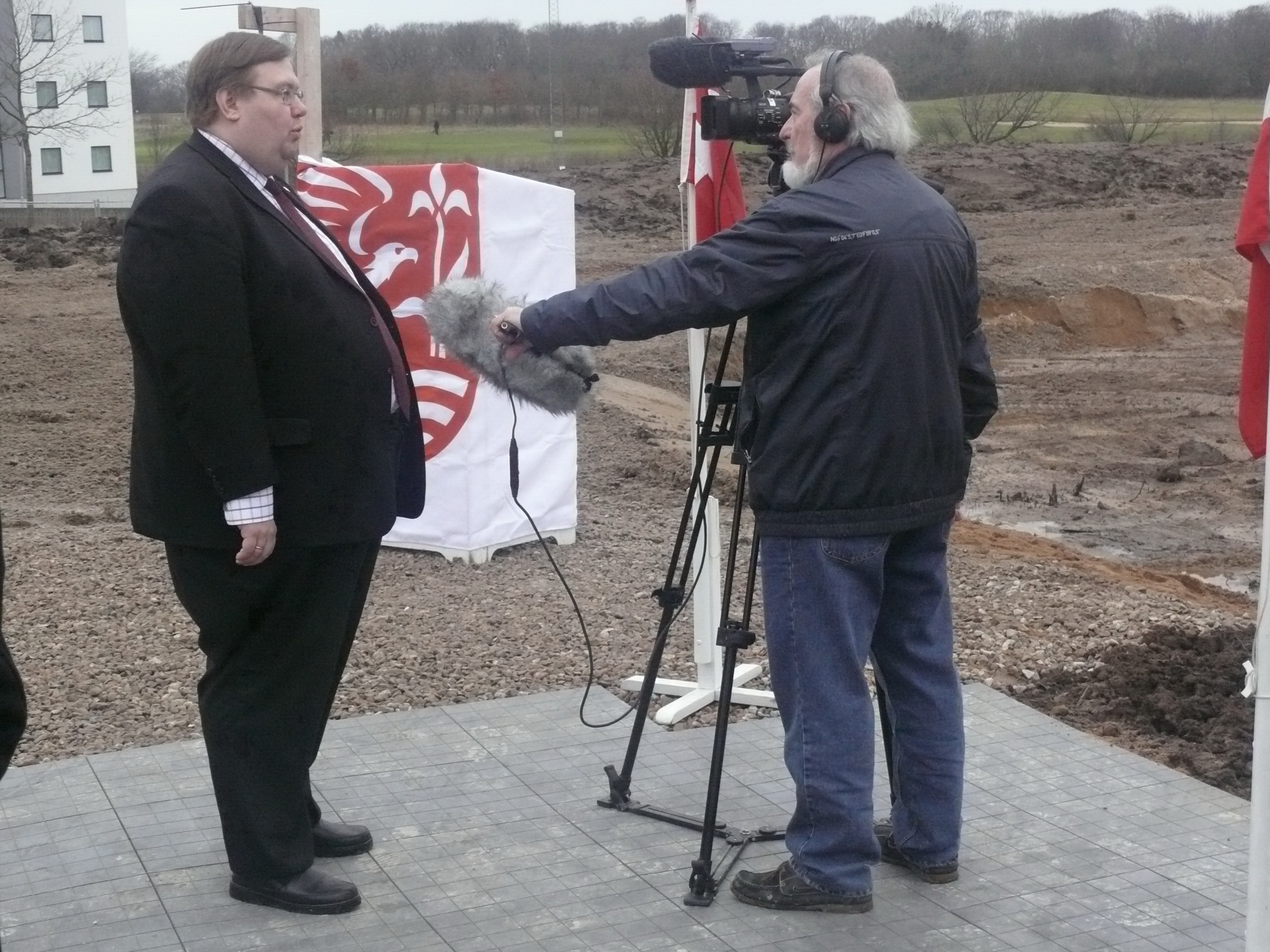
- Interview on TV SYD
- Country: Denmark
- Broadcast area: Southern Jutland; Southern Schleswig
- Headquarters: Kolding

Programming
- Language: Danish

Ownership
- Owner: DR (1983-1988); TV 2 (1988-present)

History
- Launched: 22 October 1983

Links
- Website: tvsyd.dk

TV Syd is one of TV 2's eight regional services. It is headquartered in Kolding although it was previously based in Haderslev.

TV Syd launched in 1983 as an experimental regional channel operated by Danmarks Radio (DR) transmitting on channel 7 from Sonderjylland. Programming began in full in 1984 with a news bulletin at 7pm. At night, it broadcast additional local programmes, interrupting DR's TV schedule locally from the Rangstrup transmitter in South Jutland. Upon the launch of TV 2 in 1988 it was immediately co-opted into the TV 2 network as its first regional service. In 1999, it became the first television channel in Demnark to provide an online web stream of its programmes.

It is also known for a livestream of a stork's nest.
