= TV 2 Charlie =

- Country: Denmark
- Broadcast area: Denmark
- Network: TV 2 Denmark
- Headquarters: Copenhagen, Denmark

Programming
- Picture format: 16:9/4:3

Ownership
- Owner: TV 2 Denmark
- Sister channels: TV 2 TV 2 Echo; TV 2 Fri; TV 2 News; TV 2 Sport; TV 2 Sport X

History
- Launched: 1 October 2004

Links
- Website: charlie.dk

TV 2 Charlie is a Danish television channel owned by TV 2. It was launched on 1 October 2004. The channel shows own productions and British criminal dramas (like Dalziel and Pascoe, A Touch of Frost and Silent Witness.) It broadcasts from 8:00 in the afternoon to 02:00 in the night, and is available by digital antenna (DVB-T/T2 & MPEG4), cable and satellite. In recent years programming airs almost continually, with only a short break in the deep hours of the night around 4:00. The channel is funded by usage fees and advertising. The commercials appear between the programmes only.

On satellite, TV 2 Charlie (as well as TV 2 Zulu and TV 2 Film) was initially exclusively available via Canal Digital. The competing Viasat platform started broadcasting the channels in January 2009.

== Notable programs ==
- A Touch of Frost
- All Creatures Great and Small
- Chicago Hope
- Dallas
- Dalziel and Pascoe
- Heartbeat
- Inspector Rex
- Keeping Up Appearances
- New Tricks
- NYPD Blue
- Silent Witness
- The Benny Hill Show
- The Bill
