= Danish Revue Museum =

Museum in Copenhagen

- Det Danske Revy Museum
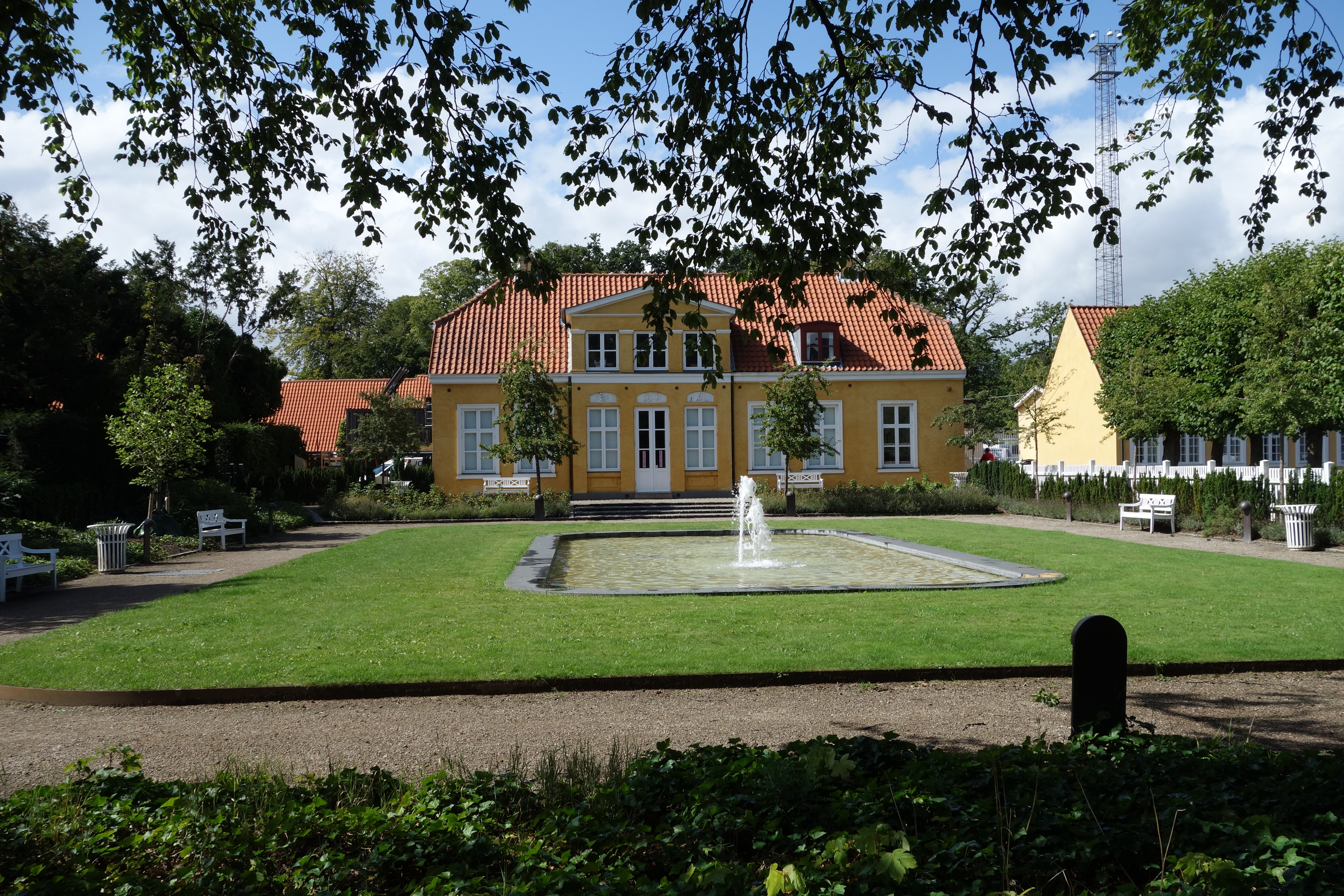
- The museum seen from Allégade
- Established: 1993
- Location: 5 Allégade, Frederiksberg; Copenhagen, Denmark
- Coordinates: 55.6755°N 12.5316°E
- Director: Erik Hvidt
- Website: www.revymuseet.dk

The Danish Revue Museum (Danish: Det Danske Revymuseum) is based in a former country house on Allégade in the Frederiksberg district of Copenhagen, Denmark. It is dedicated to the Danish Revue tradition as well as more generally to the history of humorous entertainment in Denmark.

== History ==
The museum is based on the private collection of Ida and Bent From, who were central figures of the Danish revue scene from the early 1960s for almost four decades. Originally named Morskabs-museet (English: The Amusement Museum), it opened in 1993 in the Kavalérfløjen, the Royal Danish Horticultural Society's Garden. It changed its name and moved to the current location in 2004.

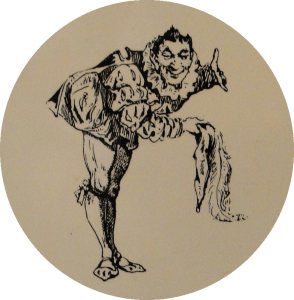
The Scaramouche engraving

== Logo ==
The logo was introduced by Bent From and is based on an engraving depicting the Italian Commedia dell'arte character Scaramouche. A bronze statue of the figure was placed in the front garden of the museum. It is based on a statuette which had previously been created by an employee, Marianne Harboe.

== Building ==
Known as Riises Landsted (English: Riise's Country House), the building is a Neoclassical country house built for August Jacob Christian Riise in 1860. It is typical for the building style favoured in Frederiksberg during the 19th century. The building is seven bays wide and has a three-bay central projection on both the front and rear. The facade is decorated with reliefs. The interior is notable for its rich stucco decorations and fine, original ceilings. The building is now owned by Realdania Byg.

== Collections ==
The museum's collections cover the time period from the first Danish revues in 1849 until the present day. They include artefacts, pictures, scrap books, manuscripts as well as extensive collections of film and sound recordings.

== Exhibitions ==
Previous special exhibitions have featured such names as Marguerite Viby, Ib Schønberg, Osvald Helmuth, Ulf Pilgaard, Liva Weel as well as venues such as Apolloteatret and Scala Teatret . The museum also has a permanent exhibition.
