= TV Midtvest =

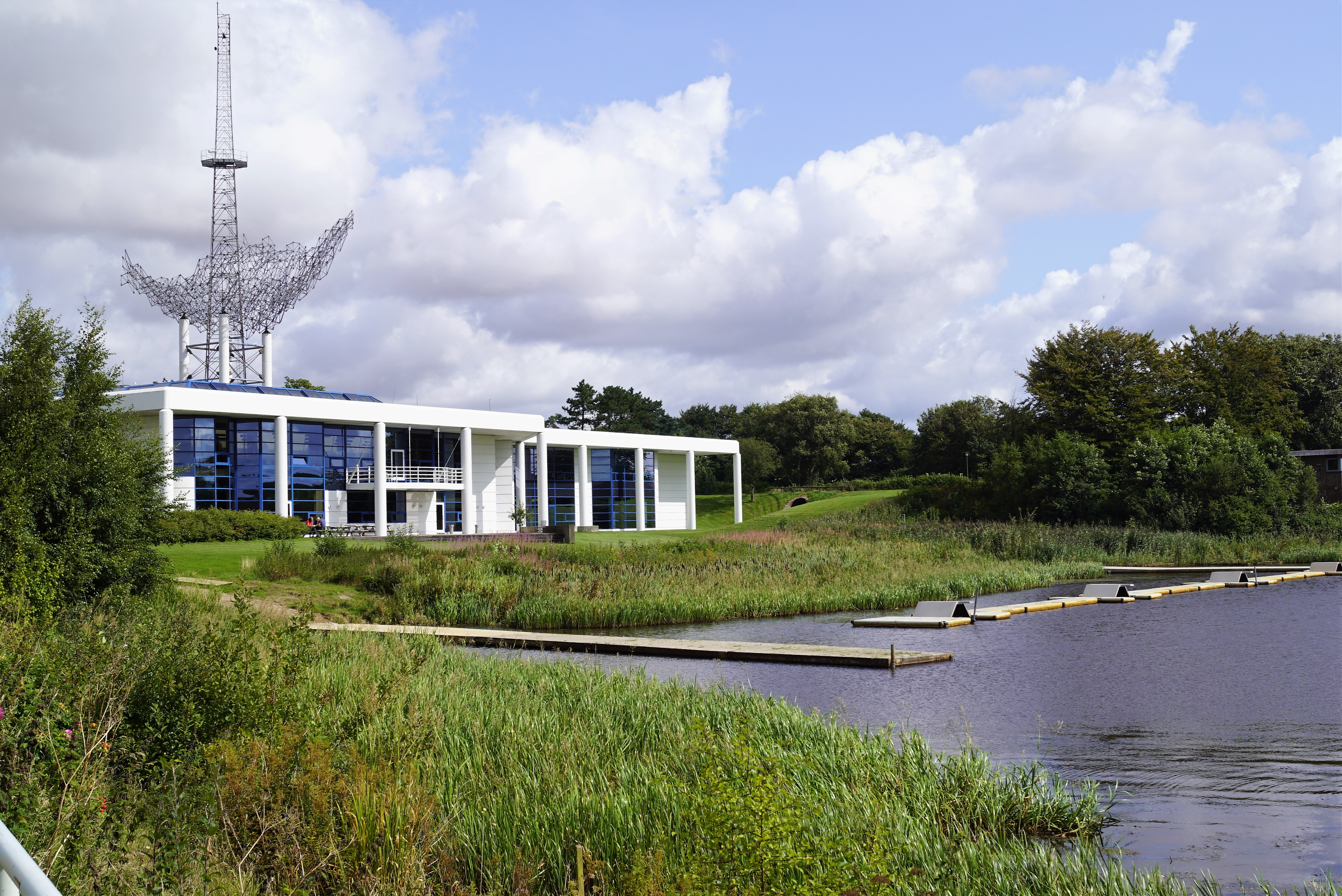
- TV Midtvest's building at Vandkraftsøen in Holstebro
- Country: Denmark
- Broadcast area: Central and Western Jutland
- Headquarters: Holstebro

Programming
- Language(s): Danish

History
- Launched: 1989

Links
- Website: www.tvmidtvest.dk

TV Midtvest is one of eight regional TV stations in the TV 2 network in Denmark, covering Central and Western Jutland (the former Ringkjøbing and Viborg Counties). The station was founded in 1989. TV Midtvest is broadcasting from Holstebro. The regional TV 2 stations are given the time slots 18:20–18:25 and 19:30–20:00 every day of the week.
