= TV 2 Sport (Danish TV channel) =

- Country: Denmark
- Broadcast area: Denmark
- Network: TV 2 Denmark
- Headquarters: Copenhagen, Denmark

Programming
- Picture format: 16:9 (HDTV)

Ownership
- Owner: TV 2 Denmark
- Sister channels: TV 2 TV 2 Echo; TV 2 Charlie; TV 2 Fri; TV 2 News; TV 2 Sport X

History
- Launched: 9 January 2015; 10 years ago
- Replaced: TV 2 Film

Links
- Website: TV 2 Sport Official website

TV 2 Sport launched as a channel in Denmark on 9 January 2015 by TV 2.

== See also ==
- TV 2 Sport X
