= TV 2 Fri =

- Country: Denmark
- Broadcast area: Denmark
- Network: TV 2
- Headquarters: Odense, Denmark

Programming
- Language: Danish
- Picture format: 576i (16:9 SDTV); 1080i (HDTV)

Ownership
- Sister channels: TV 2 TV 2 Echo; TV 2 Charlie; TV 2 News; TV 2 Sport; TV 2 Sport X

History
- Launched: 5 May 2013; 12 years ago

Links
- Website: fri.tv2.dk

TV 2 Fri is a Danish leisure and outdoor television channel launched on May 5, 2013.

Cecilie Hother is one of the main hosts on the channel, presenting Frihuset in Hornsherred, from where the daily program is broadcast live.
