= TV 2 News =

Danish news channel

- Country: Denmark
- Broadcast area: Denmark
- Network: TV 2 Denmark
- Headquarters: Copenhagen, Denmark

Programming
- Picture format: 16:9 (576i, SDTV)

Ownership
- Owner: TV 2 Denmark
- Sister channels: TV 2 TV 2 Echo; TV 2 Charlie; TV 2 Fri; TV 2 Sport; TV 2 Sport X

History
- Launched: December 1, 2006; 19 years ago
- Former names: TV 2 Nyhedskanalen (before launch)

Links
- Website: TV 2 Nyheder Official website

Availability

Terrestrial
- Boxer: Channel 9

Streaming media
- TV 2 Play: play.tv2.dk

TV 2 News (former working title: TV 2 Nyhedskanalen) is a Danish language television news channel which started broadcasting on 1 December 2006. It is one of the first 24-hour news channels in the Danish language (24Nordjyske is also a 24-hour news channel but is only shown in Nordjylland).

The channel has editorial offices at the TV 2 headquarters at Kvægtorvet in Odense, and in Copenhagen.

== History ==
On 10 December 2007, TV 2 News began using Viz Mosart from Vizrt for the channel's automation, becoming the first channel in the world to do so. At that time, TV 2 News broadcast 16 hours of live content daily.

On 31 March 2008 TV 2 News started broadcasting in the 16:9 widescreen format with an entirely new set of graphics.

On 31 January 2016, the channel upgraded to HD.

== Programming ==
The channel uses a 30-minute newswheel, with focus on different subjects throughout the day, for example traffic reports from the Danish Road Directorate, business news (17 Finans is a daily business programme updating viewers on latest in business) and sport (especially in the weekends). At 7pm, the channel broadcasts the TV 2-news until 7:25 when a daily sports programme updates viewers on the latest in sports on weekdays and "Sportsmagasinet" (Sport-magazine) on weekends. Weekdays from midnight to 6am and weekends from 11pm to 8am, the newswheel consists of re-runs of the latest one with minor changes throughout the night, when the regular newswheel starts again.

In the evening TV 2 NEWS brings interviews and analysis on the day's most important news stories.

Every Tuesday at 11.30am, the Danish PM holds his weekly news conference - the news conference is analysed by TV 2 NEWS' political editor immediately after the press conference, and Tuesday night TV 2 NEWS brings the programme 'Tirsdagsanalysen' (The Tuesday analysis) featuring the hosts of the programme 'Mogensen & Kristiansen' analysing the press conference and other relevant political stories in Denmark.

At any point, the programming can be interrupted for breaking news coverage.

Every Sunday, the channel brings the programme "Presselogen" (The Press Box) featuring several Danish news editors and media bosses discussing the media's coverage of one of the week's biggest news stories. The programme is hosted by news anchors Lotte Mejlhede.

=== Specials ===
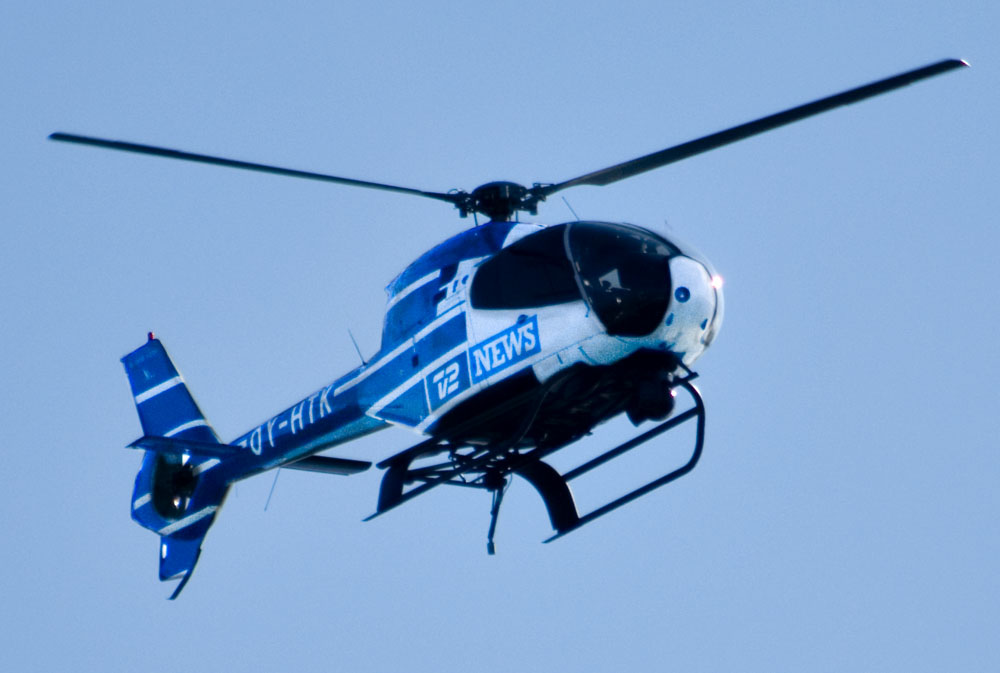
Helicopter of TV 2 News

On weekends, TV 2 NEWS brings a debate special (Mogensen & Kristiansen) showing the latest analysis on Danish politics; the programme is hosted by two former advisers to Danish prime ministers.

Every weekend, TV 2 NEWS brings the debate programme 'Ellemann|Lykketoft' featuring the two former Danish foreign ministers Uffe Ellemann-Jensen and Mogens Lykketoft. The show is hosted by Martin Krasnik, a well-known Danish journalist and foreign affairs correspondent.

'Den Næste Præsident' (The Next President) are special programmes hosted by the former Washington correspondent, Poul Erik Skammelsen, giving viewers an in-depth look on the U.S. Presidential Primaries. Similarly in March 2008, TV 2 NEWS brought a special programme called 'Den Næste Russiske Præsident' (The Next Russian President) focusing on Russia's new president and on the future for Russia.

Since August 2008 the channel has brought a weekly edition of 'Den Næste Præsident' featuring Poul Erik Skammelsen and USA analyst Mads Fuglede.

TV 2 NEWS extended the coverage of the 2008 U.S. Presidential Elections by showing the first interview given by Sarah Palin. The channel had also covered all of the 2008 Presidential Debates live. After the election TV 2 NEWS brought the programme 'Den Nye Præsident' (The New President), which takes a closer look at the new US President's first 100 days in office.

In September 2009, the channel produced a weekly special called 'Kampen for klimaet' (The Battle for the Climate). A special featuring analysis and background on the preparations for the UN Conference on Climate Change, which took place in Copenhagen, Denmark in December 2009. The special was hosted by Poul Erik Skammelsen and Kirsten Palmer featuring experts and commentators on climate change.

=== Breakthrough ===
TV 2 NEWS had its big breakthrough during three nights of heavy rioting in Copenhagen in March 2007.

In the beginning, the ratings were low, but in the end of 2007 and the first months of 2008 TV 2 NEWS improved their ratings. 1.2 million viewers watched TV 2 NEWS in week 7 of 2008, a new record. Since mid-2008 TV 2 NEWS has had around 1,2 - 1,4 million weekly viewers.

== See also ==
- List of Danish television channels
- TV 2 (Denmark)
