= TV 2 (Danish TV channel) =

Danish television channel

- Logo used since 2023

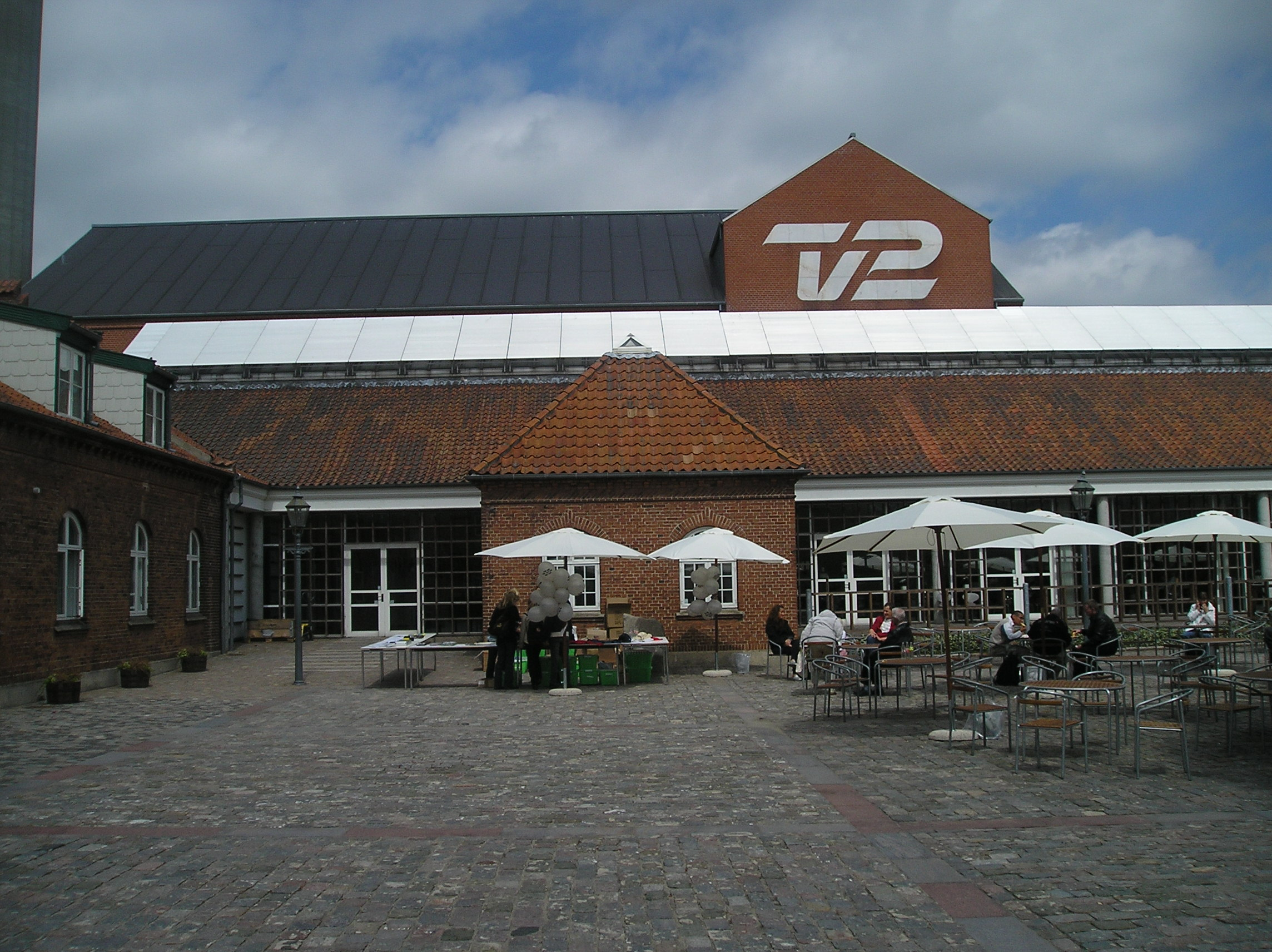
- TV 2 headquarters
- Type: broadcast and Subscription TV network through terrestrial television
- Country: Kingdom of Denmark
- Headquarters: Kvægtorvet, Odense

Ownership
- Owner: TV 2 Denmark (Danish Ministry of Culture)
- Key people: Anne Engdal Stig Christensen (CEO)
- Sister channels: TV 2 Echo; TV 2 Charlie; TV 2 Fri; TV 2 News; TV 2 Sport; TV 2 Sport X

History
- Launched: 30 May 1986 (test broadcast); 1 October 1988 (official broadcast)
- Founder: The Danish Parliament

Links
- Website: tv2.dk

TV 2 is a Danish] government-owned broadcast and subscription television station, based in Odense, Funen. The station was founded in 1986, and made its first official broadcast in 1988. It makes daily broadcasts of regional and national news, as well as its morning talk show, Go'morgen Danmark.

== History ==
Since 1949, Danmarks Radio had been the sole provider of television in Denmark. Wanting to end the monopoly, the Danish Parliament voted on 30 May 1986, to create TV2, as a second choice for public service television. Upon its establishment, it had first begun its experimental test transmissions, and then, two years later, it had therefore commenced its official broadcast on 1 October 1988, with its first program being Danish Symphony which is broadcast at 17:00, followed by the news at 19:30. The station had taken over the former Kvægtorv in Odense to use as its facilities. The new network employed sixteen UHF transmitters, while the first legal commercial television channel, TV Syd (established in 1983 and later made independent from DR) became a part of the new network's regional structure.

To prevent competition with TV Avisen on DR, the 7:30pm bulletin moved to 7pm on 2 January 1989, with the regional programming starting at 7:28pm. TV Syd was followed by TV Fyn on 10 January that year, followed by TV Nord in April. The five remaining stations of the network opened in 1990 (the TV2 transmitter network was completed in November 1989). 1989 was also marked by the premiere of Eleva2ren, the first interactive game show on Danish television, initially featuring OsWALD. This was followed in 1990 by Hugo, which eventually spawned a series of international adaptations. By 1991, it surpassed DR in ratings. That same year, it aired its first Christmas calendar series, Trollerik og pisserne, the first of its kind to be made for adults. 1992 saw TV 2 adopt the Dolby Surround stereo system for some programmes (mainly imports). An estimated 2,632,000 viewers saw the UEFA Euro 1992 final on the channel, which ended with Denmark winning over Germany 2-0.

The channel rebranded on 3 January 1994, also adopting a permanent on-screen graphic during shows, when, up until then, it would only appear in 15-minute intervals. On 1 January 1995, it broke a new record, with 2,658,000 viewers watching the Danish film The Last Exploits of the Olsen Gang. From 3 April, regional commercials were added to its eight regions. Breakfast television (Go'morgen Danmark) started on 2 December 1996. Its website launched on 14 October 1998, two weeks after its tenth anniversary. Beginning in 2000, it branched out into subscription television, with the first of these channels being TV2 Zulu. That year's Christmas calendar, Pyrus in Alletiders Eventyr, came with anaglyphic 3D glasses.

The KV government, alongside the People's Party, decided in 2002 that TV 2 should be privatized. Aiming for such a reconversion, TV 2 Danmark A/S is created and the public service contract is replaced by a public service license. The existing license was set to expire on 30 June 2004. With the start of digital terrestrial television on 31 March 2006, TV 2 started broadcasting in widescreen, leaving the 4:3 format to analogue television. That same year, its channels stopped airing the test card while off-air.

High definition broadcasts started in 2012, even though some of the programmes were in enhanced quality (expanded SD) at first. In 2015, Natholdet held an unexpected event on TV 2's teletext service, which was on the verge of being shut down. Viewers sent the most creative use of the page on any TV 2 channel that was still enabled to use teletext and send it to the producers. Due to the mass exodus of children from linear television to online platforms, its children's block Bavian ended in 2016. That same year, Badehotellet reached a record high for an original production, where the first season's finale was viewed by 1,623,000 viewers.

== Subscription and overseas availability ==
From 1 November 2009, all Danish television broadcasting became digital with DVB-T and MPEG4 standard. At the time, TV 2 did not encrypt their main channel, but TV 2 Echo, TV 2 Charlie, TV 2 Fri, TV 2 News, TV 2 Sport and TV 2 Sport X are subscription-only channels.

TV 2 Zulu who no longer broadcasts and aired between 15 October 2000 - 27 March 2023

Although the main channel had been broadcast terrestrially in the clear ever since the channel was launched, this ended on 11 January 2012 when it was encrypted and required with a monthly subscription charge of 12.50 Danish Kroner required to be paid, along with the purchase or rental of a decoder. Now it is a full subscription-based streaming platform with 1.2 million subscribers in 2025.

In southernmost Sweden and northernmost Germany (where a Danish minority lives), this means significant difficulties for their viewers in Germany and Sweden, as subscribers need a Danish postal address for ordering a decoder card. However, the channel is still available in Sweden through subscription to pay-TV services such as Com Hem and Telia. Also a special agreement between TV 2 and Kabel Deutschland has been made, that it is now available digitally in the cable television network of Vodafone Kabel Deutschland in northernmost Germany since 15 December 2011 and to keep it unencrypted there. The analogue transmission of TV 2 in the aforementioned German cable network ceased 31 January 2012 in the specific regions where it had been available before and was replaced with a German channel.

It is also available through pay-TV subscription in Norway through Allente, Altibox, and Telia.

== Regions ==
TV 2 Region	Area Served
TV Syd	Southern Jutland including Southern Schleswig
TV 2/Fyn	Funen
TV 2/Øst	Western Zealand
TV 2/Nord	Northern Jutland, Greenland and Faroe Islands
TV 2 Kosmopol	North Zealand and Copenhagen
TV/Midt-Vest	Central and Western Jutland
TV 2/Østjylland	Eastern Jutland
TV 2/Bornholm	Bornholm

== Programming ==
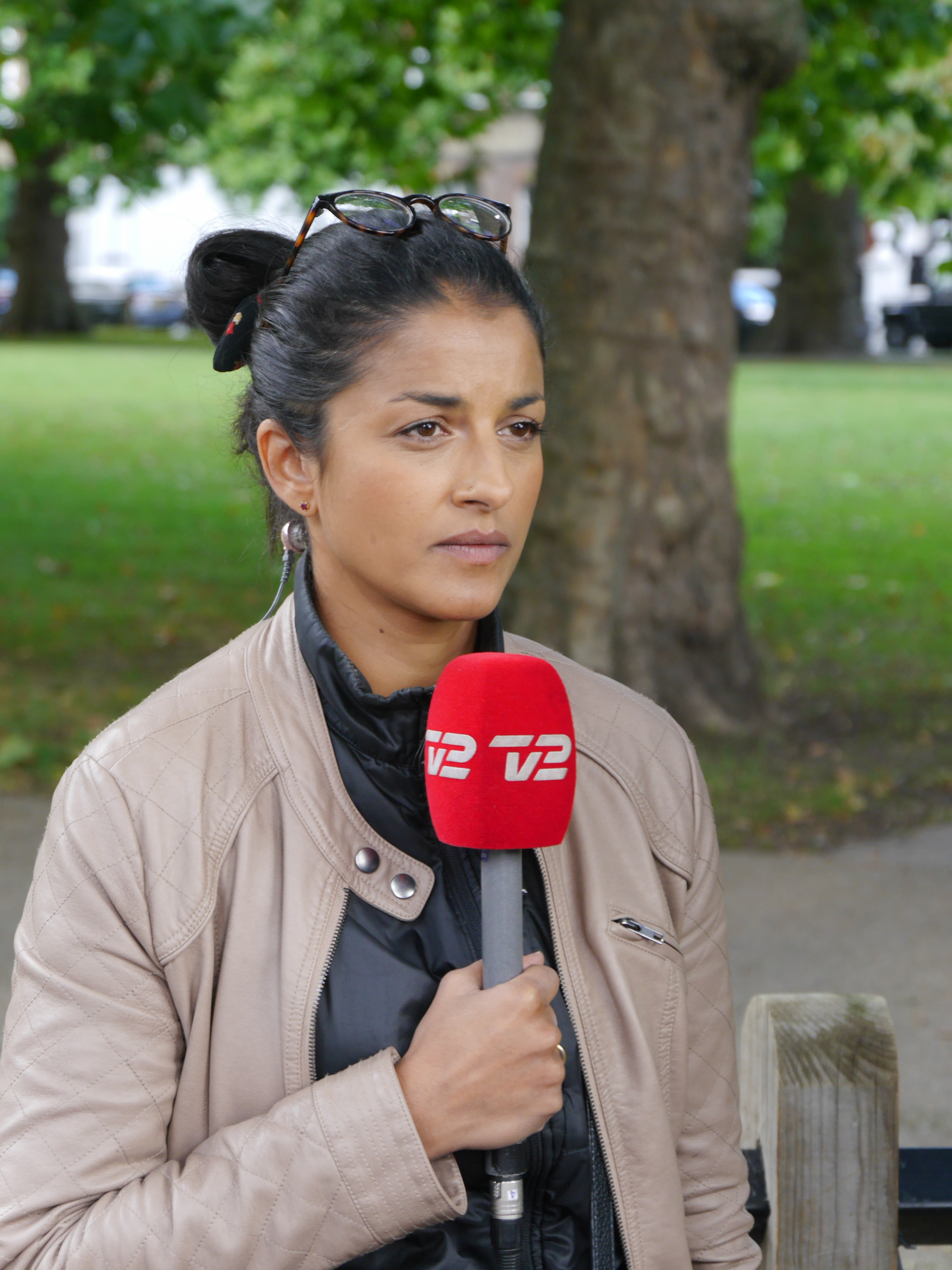
TV 2 journalist (Divya Das) reporting from the Parsons Green bombing in September 2017

On weekdays, TV 2 starts with Go'morgen Danmark (Literally: Good Morning Denmark), Denmark's only breakfast talk show on national TV.

At 11:00 they hand over to the regions who broadcast to 12:30 (with an interruption for national news). That is followed by TV 2's afternoon programming that mostly consists of drama series and sitcoms. The regional stations also broadcast bulletins in the afternoon and evening, as well as a longer newscast at 19:30.

TV 2's main national newscasts are shown at 19:00 and 21:30 but bulletins in the morning (first newscast at 6:00), at 12:00, 17:00 and 18:00 have been added over the years.

In common with other TV channels in Denmark, most foreign programmes on TV 2, as well as interviews originally conducted in a foreign language (e.g. for news and current affairs programming), are shown in their original language with Danish subtitles, the exception being animated series aimed at children which are dubbed.

== Funding ==
Historically TV 2 was funded by television license fees and advertising sales. However, although the regional channels are still partly funded this way, funding by television license for the main channel ended in July 2004.

This form of double financing, along with a large injection of capital (to cover a deficit of 1 billion DKK (€134 million)) from the Danish State, was in the 2000s under investigation by the EU; accusations being that the dual funding has constituted illegal state aid. SBS Broadcasting's Danish unit complained about this scheme in 2000; a 2004 finding by the European Commission noted that the aid was incompatible with EU norms and did not fulfill its obligation on how the government still supported the network.

== See also ==
- List of television stations in Denmark
- TV-2 (band)
- Radio 2 (Denmark)
