= Those Who Kill (2019 TV series) =

Danish thriller television series

- Den som dræber
- Genre: Crime drama Thriller
- Created by: Ina Bruhn
- Written by: Ina Bruhn; Tine Krull Petersen; Per Daumiller; Bo Hr. Hansen
- Directed by: Carsten Myllerup; Jonas Alexander Arnby; Goran Kapetanović
- Starring: Kenneth M. Christensen; Natalie Madueño; Signe Egholm Olsen; Mads Riisom; Tobias Santelmann; Helle Fagralid; Solbjørg Højfeldt; Simon Sears
- Composers: Jeppe Kaas; Mikkel Hess; Anthony Lledo
- Country of origin: Denmark
- Original language: Danish
- No. of seasons: 4
- No. of episodes: 32

Production
- Executive producers: Nanna Mailand-Mercado; Fredrik Ljungberg; Jakob Mejlhede; Marlene Billie Andreasen; Camilla Rydbacken; Filippa Wallestam
- Producers: Jonas Allen; Peter Bose; Zire Schucany; Caroline Schlüter
- Running time: 45 minutes
- Production companies: Miso Film; Viaplay/Nordic Entertainment Group

Original release
- Release: 1 March 2019

Related
- Those Who Kill

Those Who Kill (Danish: Den Som Dræber), distributed as Darkness: Those Who Kill (Danish: Den Som Dræber - Fanget af Mørket) in some regions, is a Danish crime thriller television series created by Ina Bruhn and produced by Miso Film and Viaplay/Nordic Entertainment Group. It was released on Viaplay in the Nordic countries on 1 March 2019 and has since been broadcast/streamed in several other countries. The series revolves around criminal profiler Louise Bergstein's (Natalie Madueño) attempts to link unsolved murders. The series is a reboot of the crime thriller of the same name that was created by Elsebeth Egholm and aired on TV 2 in 2011.

Madueño reprises her role as Louise across three further seasons. The second season (2021) was distributed as Blinded: Those Who Kill in some regions. It has Helle Fagralid joining the cast as Karina Hørup, the lead detective, and Tobias Santelmann as sawmill worker, Peter Vinge. The third season (2023) is also known as Lost: Those Who Kill, which introduces Simon Sears as senior detective Frederik Havgaard. It features Thit Aaberg as Maria Jepsen, whose mother Therese is killed. The fourth season (2024) has Sears reprising his role of Frederik, who becomes Louise's love interest; the series is referred to as Justice: Those Who Kill in some markets. Dag Malmberg joins the cast as Gunnar Nymark, a Swedish criminal profiler consulted by Louise.

== Plot ==
=== Season 1 ===
After spending six months unsuccessfully trying to find 17-year-old Julie Vinding (Alvilda Lyneborg Lassen), who went missing on her way home from a party in a Copenhagen suburb, detective Jan Michelson (Kenneth M. Christensen) is taken off the case by his superiors who believe the girl is dead. Michelson continues to work on the case in his spare time and discovers the disappearance of Natasha, another 17-year old blonde girl, ten years earlier. He quickly finds Natasha's body in a lake and is re-instated on the case. Michelson's boss MT (Peter Mygind) brings in criminal profiler Louise Bergstein (Natalie Madueño) to assist in the investigation. When a third blonde girl, hotel worker Emma Holst (Tessa Hoder), is kidnapped, the investigators discover that they may be hunting a serial killer.

=== Season 2 ===
After returning to Funen to see her mother's friend Alice Ejbye (Solbjørg Højfeldt), Bergstein is asked by Ejbye, who has terminal cancer, to investigate the unsolved murder of her 18-year-old son Markus Ejbye (Vilmer Trier Brøgger) five years earlier. Bergstein soon finds similarities to unsolved murders of two other young men on the island, Kasper Larsen (Téo Lepetit) and Ricky Hansen (Peter Zandersen), which also occurred five years earlier. When a fifth young man, William Fjeldby (Oscar Dyekjær Giese), a friend of Markus Ejbye, is murdered in similar circumstances, she teams up with Karina Hørup (Helle Fagralid), the lead detective on the cases, to track down a serial killer who has resumed killing after a five-year hiatus.

== Cast and characters ==
Main cast

- Natalie Madueño as Louise Bergstein: criminal profiler, women's crisis centre therapist. Season 2: dating David, starts Alice's private investigation, police consultant, separated from David. Season 3: assists Frederik in double murder case; moves to Aarhus, child psychologist, assists in disabled persons' death investigations. Season 4: delivers profiling classes at police academy, assists in gang-related murders
- Simon Sears as Frederik Havgaard: North Zealand senior detective, Karl's father, divorced from Anna, relocated to Aarhus. Becomes head of Copenhagen Homicide Unit (seasons 3–4)
- Tobias Santelmann as Peter Vinge: Norwegian-born, sawmill worker, Johannes' father (season 2, guest: season 3)

=== Season 1 (2019) Darkness: Those Who Kill ===
Main cast

- Kenneth M. Christensen as Jan Michelsen: Greve police senior detective, investigates Julie's disappearance, Annemarie's separated husband
- Signe Egholm Olsen as Stine Velin: car rental attendant
- Mads Riisom as Anders Kjeldsen: sailor, janitor, odd-jobs man, Stine's boyfriend
- Peter Mygind as Jens Møller-Thomsen "MT": police inspector, Jan's immediate boss, Louise's colleague
- Uffe Rørbæk as Dennis Højbjerg: police detective, Jan's colleague
- Tessa Hoder as Emma Holst: hotel employee, missing woman
- Regitze Estrup as Gitte Hermansen: police detective, Jan's colleague

Recurring cast

- Dorte Højsted as Bente Velin: Stine's mother
- Maibritt Saerens as Anette Karlslund: police chief, MT's boss
- Peter Plaugborg as Mikkel Velin: Stine's brother
- Frieda Krøgholt as Stine Velin, 16 år (English: 16 year-old): runs away from home, met Anders
- Camilla Lau as Yasmin: Louise's crisis centre client, beaten by best friend
- Alvilda Lyneborg Lassen as Julie Vinding: missing woman
- Ida Hupfeld as Amanda: Louise's client, raped by brother's friend
- Rosa Skotte Espersen as Fanny: Louise's client, raped by ex-boyfriend
- Peter Damm-Ottesen as Ole Velin: Stine's father
- Maria Erwolter as Camilla: Mikkel's wife
- Malene Beltoft Olsen as Sisse Vestergaard: karate instructor, Emma's friend
- Katinka Evers-Jahnsen as Olivia: Mikkel's daughter
- Pernille Andersen as Annemarie: Jan's separated wife, has new boyfriend
- Anders Khayat as Anders Kjeldsen, 18 år (English: 18 year-old): released from juvenile home, meets Stine
- Josephine Raahauge as Retsmediciner (English: Coroner): examines corpses during Jan's cases
- Alexander Behrang Keshtkar as Murad: forensic analyst
- Petrine Agger as Karen
- Sonny Lindberg as Rasmus Vinding: Julie's older brother

=== Season 2 (2021) Blinded: Those Who Kill ===
Main cast

- Helle Fagralid as Karina Hørup: Odense senior police detective; investigates Markus' death
- Kasper Leisner as Torben Vissinge: police detective
- Jens Andersen as Søren Dedenroth: police detective
- Louis Næss-Schmidt as Johannes Zelinsky Vinge: Peter and Masja's son
- Solbjørg Højfeldt as Alice Ejbye: retired judge, Markus' mother, has terminal brain tumour, Louise's friend

Recurring cast

- Henrik Prip as Leif Halborg: sawmill owner, Peter's boss
- Josephine Park as Masja Zelinsky: Singapore-based property developer, Peter's wife, Johannes' mother, divorcing Peter
- Rosalinde Mynster as Illona Larsen: pharmacist's cashier, Kasper's sister
- Peder Thomas Pedersen as Bo Hørup: Karina's husband
- Oscar Dyekjær Giese as William Fjeldby: construction company's deputy chairman, Gorm's son, Markus' classmate
- Vilmer Trier Brøgger as Markus Ejbye: restaurant dishwasher, high-achieving secondary school graduate, Alice's 18-year-old son
- Alfred Fristrup Villadsen as Elliot Berthelsen: Johannes' classmate
- Henrik Vestergaard as Elliots far (English: Elliot's father)
- Téo Lepetit as Kasper Larsen: realtor, Illona's brother

=== Season 3 (2023) Lost: Those Who Kill ===
Main cast

- Thit Aaberg as Maria Jepsen / Maria Bech: Therese's 19-year-old daughter, Bjørn's sister, heavily pregnant, has baby, Sebastian. After Bjørn's death, she changed her last name. Has boyfriend, Ulrik
- Alex Høgh Andersen as Bjørn Jepsen: Therese's 23-year-old son
- Jacob Lohmann as Jon Simonsen: Breidablik founder
- Laura Bro as Anja Müller: Maria's counsellor
- Clara Rosager as Alberte Hvilsted: Herning resident home carer for disabled clients, Frej's mother

Recurring cast

- Ene Øster Bendtsen as Margit: Breidablik farmer, Bjørn's co-worker
- Anders Brink Madsen as Jens Bjerg: Aalborg police detective
- William Halken as Bertram Beier: Aarhus police detective, Frederik's new partner
- Afshin Firouzi as Adnan Amani: North Zealand police detective
- Jesper Lohmann as Klaus Bergstein: retiring doctor, Louise's father

=== Season 4 (2024) Justice: Those Who Kill ===
Main cast

- Dag Malmberg as Gunnar Nymark: Swedish criminal profiler, lecturer
- Cyron Melville as Jacob Østergaard: police detective on Frederik's homicide squad
- Maria Cordsen as Lea: police detective on Frederik's squad
- Rasmus Hammerich as Bjarke Møller: police investigator (Gang Unit)
- Besir Zeciri as Kim Jensen/Erichsen: Legion-5 (L5) gang member, Melissa's partner
- Juli Mustaniemi as My Olsson: Melissa's daughter
- Kajsa Ernst as Lena Nymark: Gunnar's wife, Karin's mother

Regular cast

- Julia Ragnarsson as Melissa Olsson: petrol station attendant, Kim's partner, My's mother
- Christoffer Hvidberg Rønje as Jimmy Sørensen: Legion-5 hanger-on, Kim's friend
- Carl Løber Roliggaard as Karl Havgaard: Anna and Frederik's son
- Omar Shargawi as Robin Smith: Legion-5 gang leader
- Clint Ruben as Patrick Antonsen: Legion-5 gang second-in-charge, released homicide prisoner
- Maria Rich as Pernille Bjerre: defence attorney
- Rikke Louise Andersson as Linda Jensen: Kim's estranged mother, Henrik's wife

== Release ==
Season 1 was released in the Nordic countries on the Viaplay streaming service on 1 March 2019. NPO 3 started broadcasting season 1 in the Netherlands on 20 April 2019. In the UK BBC Four started broadcasting season 1 as Darkness: Those Who Kill on 31 August 2019. In Australia season 1 premiered on SBS On Demand on 18 December 2019. In Germany it started streaming as Darkness – Schatten der Vergangenheit on the Joyn Plus+ service on 26 November 2019. In Spain Filmin started streaming season 1 as Darkness: La Huella del Crimen on 3 March 2020. Arte broadcast season 1 in September 2020 as Le Tueur de l'Ombre in France and Darkness – Schatten der Vergangenheit in Germany.

Season 2 started streaming on Viaplay on 28 March 2021. It was broadcast on BBC Four in the UK in May as Blinded: Those Who Kill and streamed on Acorn TV in the US and Joyn Plus+ in Germany.

Season 3 was broadcast on BBC Four in the UK as Lost: Those Who Kill, starting on 8 April 2023.

Season 4 was broadcast on BBC Four in the UK as Justice: Those Who Kill, starting on 26 October 2024.

== Reception ==
The series was nominated for the Best TV Series (Årets tv-serie) award at the Danish Film Academy's 2020 Robert Awards. Tessa Hoder was nominated for the Best Danish Actor (Årets danske skuespiller) award at TV 2 Zulu's 2020 Zulu Awards.

== Episode guide ==
=== Season one ===
No. overall	No. in season	Title	Directed by	Written by	Original release date
1	1	"Episode 1" (Afsnit 1)	Carsten Myllerup	Ina Bruhn	1 March 2019
Anders watches Emma at train station. Julie's missing for six months: no new leads. MT: reallocating resources, downscale case. Jan informs Vindings, but promises to keep looking. Jan checks 10–20 years old cases: finds Natasha's 2008 file has similarities to Julie's. Natasha missing after prom. Police deemed it suicide. Jan interviews parents: Natasha attempted suicide three years earlier, therapy helped. Natasha was previously followed from station. Jan notices Natasha's alternate route passes lake. Jan calls in divers: corpse found. Dental records confirm it's Natasha. Anette: require expert opinion before combining cases. MT convinces Louise to assist. Louise: Natiasha's dress missing; likely souvenir, Julie's taken because she's lookalike. Louise: impulse-driven sociopath will strike again. Emma takes karate lessons with Sisse. Anette to MT: no public revelation of combining cases. Van follows Emma, but stops, turns away. Emma phones Sisse: being followed. Anders knocks Emma out, puts her in van. Sisse contacts police, plays phone message, provides Emma's photo. Louise's supervisor: unready for police work. Jan assists Rasmus, who's been in fight over Julie's fate. Louise to Jan: perpetrator has recent trigger to restart crimes. Jan convinces Louise to continue on Emma's case. Battered Emma wakes on mattress, sees Julie sleeping nearby.
2	2	"Episode 2" (Afsnit 2)	Carsten Myllerup	Ina Bruhn, Per Daumiller	8 March 2019
1985: Anders locked up by mother, Ulla. No food or water for two days, drinks from snowdome. Present: police attend burnt out van. Emma's earring, purposely left behind. Emma in basement: no running water, bucket for waste, locked door. Julie's too frightened to talk. Louise: perpetrator 35–45 years old, record of sexual assault, rape or indecency. Louise: probably met Natasha at school, check male staff. Jan, Louise obtain faculty list from principal. Jan, Louise investigate former student Peter's home; find Natasha's photos on computer. Stine resets basement's entry code. Peter's alibi checked: he was in Cyprus when Julie was taken. Stine dines with family, but undecided about attending Mikkel's birthday; he's pushy. Anders at Stine's home, cannot access basement. Amanda describes assault; she did not say "No" so it's not rape? Louise: it is rape. Stine apologises for changing code, shares Ander's shower. Louise notices staff photo has extra man compared with list; she updates Jan. Missing man's janitor, Anders. Jan: Anders criminal history: burglary, robbery, 2011 rape. Emma prays, approaches Julie again. Anders' psychologist: emotionally abused as child, probably sexually abused, too. Anders forces Emma to wear yellow dress, rapes Emma. Jan, Louise find Ulla's corpse near snowdome.
3	3	"Episode 3" (Afsnit 3)	Carsten Myllerup	Ina Bruhn, Tine Krull Petersen	8 March 2019
1990: Ulla collects Anders from farmer, Erling. Erling resists, but Ulla cites police. Ulla's boyfriend, Lars takes Anders away. Present: Coroner: Ulla tied to chair, died of thirst, 1.5 years ago. Louise: Anders' MO changed between Natasha and Julie. Stine puts bread in basement, collects bucket, does not speak. Louise: do not release Anders description until Natasha's funeral, he may attend. Julie wears Emma's earring for missed birthday. Swedish policeman, Lasse details possible victim, Erika's 2014 case: taken by van, kept for days, same knots, ring finder severed. Louise: too many differences from Natasha, Julie. Police at funeral: Anders does not show; Stine secretly films. Emma disconnects pipe. Julie: Anders will kill me. Stine shows video, points to police. Anders: will remove one. Lars to police: uncontrollable Anders ran to Erling's farm. Police visit Erling. Anders enjoyed farm life, but could not prevent Ulla. Saw Anders last year, near slurry pit. Inside, Jan sees corpse's hand. Anders comes for Julie, Emma hits him with pipe. They go upstairs but foiled by locked door. Anders recovers, attacks; locks Emma inside, takes Julie. Murad: three corpses, all missing ring finger. Anders arrives at farm, Jan chases van but car gets stuck. Anders escapes.
4	4	"Episode 4" (Afsnit 4)	Carsten Myllerup	Ina Bruhn	22 March 2019
1998: Stine walks along; Anders, on motorcycle, offers ride. Present: Annette: alert public if finding Anders' car. Gitte, Dennis: identify Anders from petrol station CCTV. Dennis to Jan: van behind gravel pit. Julie's corpse in boot. Emma attempts to convince Stine to free her. Stine feigns being under Anders' control. Jan notifies Vindings. Coroner report on three slurry victims: all dealt mortal blow to head, left ring finder severed. Oldest corpse has knots, per Natasha. Stine invents story of being captured, raped for decades. Stine confirms Julie's dead; locks door leaves Emma crying in basement. Coroner to Jan: Julie still alive when chasing van. Two slurry victims: Rose illegal immigrant, prostitute 2017; Samira asylum centre detainee 2016. Annemarie visits Jan: will buy his portion of home. Louise sees Julie's earring. MT, Anette decides to release Anders' photo tomorrow. Louise to Jan: Emma could still be alive. Stine convinces Emma she will help escape. Samira's colleague: Samira fled when residency denied. Stine blindfolds Emma, takes her into car's boot. Stine drives to lonely road. Louise: slurry victims, Erika do not match Anders' MO. Stine lets Emma go, she runs towards Anders. Louise: Anders has an accomplice. Stine gloats over Emma's recapture.
5	5	"Episode 5" (Afsnit 5)	Carsten Myllerup	Ina Bruhn	27 March 2019
1998: Stine taunts Mikkel, lets him feel her breast. Stine threatens to tell parents. Mikkel follows Stine to bedroom, rapes her. Present: Stine provides food; Emma does not eat. Louise: identifying Anders will force him into dormancy; do not mention accomplice. Stine leaves work after seeing TV announcement. At home, Anders has gone. When Bente visits, Stine agrees to attend party. Jan, Louise seek Anders at men's shelter. Fellow resident: sometimes saw Anders at harbour in old boat. Jan: it's empty, but he stayed recently. Louise finds Natasha's dress. Anders sees Jan, Louise with dress. Anders returns to Stine's. Stine: police know your name, found slurry victims, Julie. Anders: police took dress. Anders bashes Stine, when preventing him leaving. Anders tries to kidnap cyclist, but passersby stop him. Jan: use Sisse as decoy to lure Anders. Stine attends Mikkel's party. Olivia shows Stine her new phone. During dinner, Stine publicly accuses Mikkel of raping her. MT calls off lure operation. As Louise exits, Anders grabs, knocks out Louise. Jan, Sisse have sex. Anders takes Louise out, orders her to phone for Natasha's dress. Louise: reveals his partner does the killing; Anders denies it. Police car sounds siren, Anders drives off.
6	6	"Episode 6" (Afsnit 6)	Carsten Myllerup	Ina Bruhn, Tine Krull Petersen	3 April 2019
1998: Bente disbelieves Stine, Mikkel claims Stine slept with others. Present: Louise: Anders reacted when accomple mentioned. Emma tries drinking from taps, little is released. Gitte: John was in prison alongside Anders. John admits to prison time: fought bully. Anders enters basement, Emma begs for water. Stine watches Anders masturbate onto Emma's dress. Anders cannot get erect. Anette castigates MT for using Sisse as bait. MT to Jan: external assistance takeover in three days. Louise to Jan: accomplice worked with Anders for four years. Anders tells Stine: police know about accomplice. Stine: take Emma, kill her; let's leave. Yasmin describes savagely beating from her best friend at urging of his new girlfriend. Therapy group notice Louise's bruises, scratches. Louise: accomplice could be woman. Anders drugs water. Gitte: third slurry victim: Mette (2018), also refugee-prostitute. Emma gulps down water. Mette's friend Karla: Mette stayed at women's refuge, thought returned to home country. Stine buries bottle of severed fingers. Refuge manager: Stine looked after Mette, Samira. Jan finds photo of Stine attending Natasha's funeral. Stine's packed bag, prepares to leave when doorbell rings. Drunken Mikkel accosts Stine, she walks outside, but police arrest her. Stine plays victim, shows basement room. Emma's gone.
7	7	"Episode 7" (Afsnit 7)	Carsten Myllerup	Ina Bruhn, Per Daumiller	10 April 2019
1998: Anders, Stine have sex. Stine asks Anders to attack Mikkel. Present: Murad finds slurry victims' fingers. Anders sees police at Stine's. Stine: Anders buried fingers. Louise notices Stine tells truth when looking directly at Jan, but lies when downcast. Emma's tied up on couch. Anders threatens her with knife, withdraws. Fingers checked, none are Erika's or Emma's. Mikkel to police: berated Stine for flirting at party. Mikkel: Stine's former boyfriend, Martin was Swedish. Stine: never met Erika. Stine lies: did not know Anders when Erika died. Anders loosens Emma's gag, gives water. Louise to Jan: Stine's disturbed past involves family. Bente: Stine became uncontrollable; lied about people, slept around from young age. Mikkel was bashed up 20 years ago; identifies Anders as attacker. Mikkel describes Stine's speech as fantasised abuse. Parents believed Mikkel, not Stine. Louise to Stine: believe Mikkel raped you. Stine looks straight at Louise: lies about where Emma is. Jan leads police to false location. Policeman takes Stine to car. Stine grabs his gun, gets uncuffed. Louise phones Jan: Stine escaped; going to parents. Anders approaches Emma with knife, cuts her bonds. Before Emma leaves, Stine arrives, knocks Emma out. Stine shoots Anders, dead; Emma screams.
8	8	"Episode 8" (Afsnit 8)	Carsten Myllerup	Ina Bruhn, Tine Krull Petersen	17 April 2019
1998: Bente accompanies Stine to boarding school. When alone together, Stine hits Bente with tennis racquet. Present: MT consoles Louise over Stine's escape. MT to squad: will announce Stine as accomplice. Stine dresses Emma as boy, search for Velins. Stine sighted at marina. Witness: left from shed. Jan, Dennis enter: find Anders' corpse. Stine steals car from her work place. At school, Stine uses Olivia's phone to find Mikkel's location. Jan, Louise pick up Olivia, Camilla go to summerhouse. Ole hears shots, Mikkel sees dead police. Emma, Stine enter. Stine orders them to sit. Mikkel finally admits he raped Stine. Stine shoots Mikkel: prevents parents from tending. Olivia reveals Stine used phone. Jan: no answer from summerhouse; calls for back up. Stine tells Ole to leave, but shoots him. Jan stops car, orders Camilla, Olivia to wait. Stine asks Bente to choose, who's killed next: Bente or Emma? Jan enters, asks to let Emma go. Stine shoots Jan, who's injured, but Jan knocks Stine out. Louise arrives with police backup. Jan has shoulder wound. Dennis: Mikkel died, Ole in recovery. Louise asks Dennis to gather Emma's parents. Louise, Jan enter Emma's room. Louise talks Emma into welcoming her parents.

=== Season two ===
No. overall	No. in season	Title	Directed by	Written by	Original release date
9	1	"Episode 1" (Afsnit 1)	Jonas Alexander Arnby	Ina Bruhn	8 May 2021
Five years ago: Markus kneels before masked murderer, who wields knife. Markus' has numerous wounds, arms tied; rope tightens around neck. Present: In Odense, Alice asks Louise to review Markus' information. Alice: Karina leads investigation. Louise consults Karina: victims Markus, Esben and Kasper were killed overnight. Alice: home broken into before murder. Markus' graduation hat's missing. Masja to Peter: remaining in Singapore, want Johannes to visit. Louise notifies Karina of break-in; asks to attend when other families queried. Peter jogs along path, tries keeping up with another runner, but lags behind. Ebsen's mother: trophy stolen. Illona: had break-in. Karina to Louise: need new profile. All victims had stab wounds, then strangled by rope. Peter prepares kit, wears mask, enters Ricky's bedroom, notices military medals. Karina points out corpses' locations. Louise: killer enjoys victim's fears, probably lives nearby; victim selection is not random: each are high-achievers. Likely knew first victim: Markus. Karina hires Louise as consultant. Ricky returns home after partying. Notices uniform hanging out of place. Peter attacks, subdues Ricky. Upon waking, Ricky's tied to car's front. Peter slices Ricky's soles, cuts off ropes; chases Ricky. Peter crosses footbridge, Ricky, Peter struggle. Peter repeatedly stabs Ricky, who drifts along creek.
10	2	"Episode 2" (Afsnit 2)	Jonas Alexander Arnby	Per Daumiller, Ina Bruhn	8 May 2021
Ricky's corpse discovered. Louise to Alice: unsure it's same killer. Leif asks Peter to meet William. Victim identified as ex-Army, teacher, Ricky. William bids for sawmill. Peter to Leif: Masja wants divorce. Louise, Karina search Ricky's home. Louise: Army medal's missing. Johannes: want new smartphone. Peter: new screen instead. Peter, masked, enters William's flat, takes watch. Teacher to Peter: Johannes fought Elliot, who threw Johannes' phone out window. Peter agrees to meet with Elliot's parents. William notices missing watch. William and wife Elvira view news report on Ricky's death. Coroner: Ricky sedated by midazolam, soles cut with knife. Louise: freed Ricky to hunt him. Colonel: Ricky would never give medal away. Johannes, Elliot argued over Johannes not hosting combined birthday party. Louise learns of victims' exceptional achievements. William greets Alice at Markus' grave. Peter apologises to Johannes for forgetting party. Louise: killing Ricky was unsatisfactory as killer lost control; likely to strike again. Peter in William's flat, sedates Elvira first, cuts William, indicates Elvira. Motions for silence, releases William's mouth. Karina, Louise visit William's flat. Elvira: William gone, phone here, car keys taken. Elvira: man was here, jabbed me. Louise points to pillow's blood. At William's parking spot, more blood.
11	3	"Episode 3" (Afsnit 3)	Jonas Alexander Arnby	Tine Krull Petersen, Ina Bruhn	15 May 2021
Police search for William's corpse. Louise to Alice: same killer murdered Ricky, now has William. Karina updates William's parents. After two days, Karina scales down search. Peter gives present to Johannes. Leif arrives with present. Peter: no present from Masja. Alice resigns from community committee. Louise, Karina drive along minor roads looking for CCTV cameras; they find footage of William's car passing. Leif tells Peter: police interviewing people, whom William met. William's father, Gorm believes it's kidnapping, not serial killer. Care home resident describes William's car. They follow side road: find car in hay field. Peter to Johannes: workshop's locked due to break-ins. Karina orders police to undertake door-to-door search. Alice invites Louise to restaurant. Peter arrives late for Johannes' match. Peter apologises, takes Johannes out for meal. Louise, Peter see each other waiting at toilets. When Alice goes to bed, Louise phones Elvira. Masja to Johannes: like your present? Johannes finds present in workshop. Elvira: watch was grandfather's confirmation present. Louise to Karina: stolen mementos signify close family bonds. Karina, Louise learn from Gorm that grandfather started business. Louise sees grandfather's farm. Louise, Karina enter hut, find William hanging from rafters: he's been tortured. Gorm arrives grabs William's legs.
12	4	"Episode 4" (Afsnit 4)	Jonas Alexander Arnby	Bo Hr. Hansen, Ina Bruhn	15 May 2021
William died by strangulation, after numerous cuts. Louise: killer will continue if anger was unsated. Doctor to Alice, Louise: tumour's expanding rapidly; no treatment – only pain relief. Karina: publicly confirm same killer as five years ago, provide description of killer's moods. Alice views Louise's files. Peter, Johannes argue over Peter hiding Masja's present: new mobile phone. Johannes runs away. Alice posts video: killer has five victims, reward of 500,000kr. for capture; displays police photos of wounds, strangulation rope, goads killer. Louise berates Alice for revealing sensitive information, provoking killer. Louise packs bags. Peter searches for Johannes. Louise moves into cabin. Karina cleared Louise with chief. Previous victim, Martin attacked in Aalborg six years ago. Leif calls Peter: Johannes's sleeping here. Louise's boyfriend, David's buying large apartment. Louise not ready to move in. Alice gets handgun from ex-con, Oliver. Peter views Alice's video. Martin heard camera beep; being filmed. Masja phones, Peter refuses Johannes visiting Singapore. David hurt by Louise's rejection; he leaves. Alice sees USB video of Markus being tortured, before he's murdered. Peter watches Alice from outside, she goes out but cannot find him. Alice returns inside, loads gun but cannot shoot. Louise hears Alice's message, discovers Alice's corpse holding gun.
13	5	"Episode 5" (Afsnit 5)	Goran Kapetanovic	Per Daumiller, Ina Bruhn	22 May 2021
Louise plans to reconcile with David, after Alice's funeral. Karina visits: Alice's death considered suicide. Alice's ashes buried with Markus. Alice's brother, Kaj: Alice's never suicidal. Louise to squad: may not be suicide. Louise to Karina: killer came to rear jetty by water, watched from garden, followed Alice inside after she saw him. Søren checks neighbouring wharves. Torben describes gun, likely sold by Oliver. Johannes perceives Peter's angered by Masja seeking divorce. Johannes sees Peter drive off late at night. Louise interviews Oliver, who admits to giving gun to Alice after seeing video. Karina: makes suicide more likely. Søren introduces kayaker, Lars, who recalls shed break-in, kayak damaged. Peter collects Johannes, who's disgruntled when not allowed to stay over with Elliot. Kaj to Louise: reward still stands. David breaks up with Louise. Leif wants Peter to takeover sawmill upon Leif's retirement. Peter learns Johannes saw him going off at night. Søren shows CCTV: masked man going to and from kayak shed. Karina: cannot tell who it is. Peter, Johannes argue over Johannes spilling family secrets. Johannes stomps off. Torben: pottery chip in kayak. Louise: Alice had similar vase. Karina finds pottery shard at Alice's: killer was at both places.
14	6	"Episode 6" (Afsnit 6)	Goran Kapetanovic	Tine Krull Petersen, Ina Bruhn	22 May 2021
At petrol station, Peter pays Louise's bill as she's forgotten her credit card. Louise gets Peter's address to repay. Louise to squad: killer likely to cover tracks, destroy evidence. Louise notices USB logo's similarity to Kasper's business logo. Louise hands Peter, money in envelope, with her address. Illona to police: USBs given to clients. Fellow sawmiller, Leon to Leif, Peter: police hired profiler. Peter rushes home, deletes kill videos, destroys hard drive; starts bagging clothes. Peter dumps bags in public bins. Peter assaults irate driver in carpark. Later driver and his colleagues attack Peter. Illona to Louise: Kasper had problems with Ørslev, who sold house. Peter has bruising across ribs. Peter meets Louise, again; claims he's divorced, Johannes camping for weekend. Irate driver, now drunk, stumbles along. Peter follows, viciously attacks driver. Karina: Ørslev was divorced, left army before Kasper died. Police visit Ørslev: he uses a wheelchair. He recalls Kasper cheating another buyer, Masja, out of Ørslev's house. Louise picks up jogging Peter as it's raining. Louise, Peter talk; he recalls his childhood. Karina discards Kasja from suspects: lives in Singapore, bought house alone. Karina: further trimming of client list required before surveillance. Louise returns to visit Peter, they have sex.
15	7	"Episode 7" (Afsnit 7)	Goran Kapetanovic	Bo Hr. Hansen, Ina Bruhn	29 May 2021
Peter claims: molecular biology doctorate. Johannes returns home early. Peter lies: Louise paid petrol bill; Johannes shows Louise's bracelet. When leaving, Louise admits being criminal profiler. Peter finds Louise's address, breaks into cabin; discovers CCTV photos of himself near kayak shed. At home, Louise notices cat inside. Peter loads up his kit. Louise reviews CCTV photos, phones Karina: killer lost right glove. Karina searches wharf area, finds discarded glove. Peter knocks out Karina; grabs glove. Johannes observes Peter burning evidence. Karina in hospital: did not see attacker. Police check Karina, but no foreign DNA. Peter to Leif: quits sawmill, without explanation. Peter to Johannes: moving to Norway. Martin to Louise: do not recognise suspects. Louise notices Martin's molecular biology book. Martin taught Peter, who forged experimental results – left course unfinished. Johannes to Peter: rather go to Singapore. Peter slaps Johannes, who locks himself in bedroom. Martin to police: never suspected Peter as attacker. Peter was living alone when early victims were killed; reunited with Masja after Kasper's death. Restarted killing when Masja left Peter for Singapore. Armed police enter Peter's home, but only find Johannes. Karina notices Johannes recognise Louise. Police find Peter's trophy hoard. Peter meets Masja at restaurant.
16	8	"Episode 8" (Afsnit 8)	Goran Kapetanovic	Ina Bruhn	29 May 2021
Karina orders Louise to explain how Johannes recognised her. Louise: met Peter by chance when petrol bill was paid, again when she returned payment. Louise does not reveal they had sex. Peter agrees to Masja's request to take Johannes to Singapore. Police search for Peter. Masja returns to hotel room. Peter turns around before police roadblock. Peter removes phone's SIM card. Johannes to Karina: Louise spent night with Peter. Karina berates Louise for lying, impeding investigation. Karina orders Louise to leave investigation. Peter enters Masja's room. Peter, Masja argue – Peter punches Masja. Louise packs her bag. Søren: Masja landed in Denmark, yesterday, staying at local hotel. Louise sleeps on couch, when she wakes: Peter's there. He's undecided about killing her. Police look for Masja: she's not in her room. Peter asks Louise to analyse him. Police trace rental car: it's at Louise's home. Louise: Johannes will learn what his father has done. Louise tells Peter she's leaving and exits. Louise frees hysterical Masja from car boot as police approach. Peter runs off towards highway. Peter suicides by jumping in front of oncoming truck. Karina tidies up investigation; Louise arrives. Louise, Karina farewell Johannes, Masja. Karina covers Louise's indiscretion with Peter.

=== Season three ===
No. overall	No. in season	Title	Directed by	Written by	Original release date
17	1	"Episode 1" (Afsnit 1)	Mads Kamp Thulstrup	Ina Bruhn	8 January 2023
Louise sits inside car. From behind, Peter touches her hair. Louise wakes. Louise describes her nightmare to therapist, who considers: Louise's developing PTSD. Louise meets Frederik, who describes knife murders of dating couple Hans, Therese. Suspect Kevin was breaking into Therese's house. Louise views crime scene. Louise: killer waited for Therese, stabbed her first; attacked Hans after he paid taxi driver. Killer returned to Therese, slit her throat: they knew each other. Killer faked scene to simulate burglary. Kevin too professional to smash window; did not know Therese. Louise: consider relatives. Frederik, Louise visit Maria and Anja. Maria: not seen Bjørn since moving to Copenhagen, fell out because when Maria left co-living farm, Breidablik. Both had not seen Therese in five years. Louise's nightmare: Kevin attacks Louise, turns into Peter, who kisses/chokes her. Louise visits Klaus: retiring soon, he reminisces about boat holidays. Police search for Bjørn, also trace Therese's recent activities. Louise revisits Maria; helps assemble cot. Bjørn asked Maria to abort foetus. Restaurant CCTV shows Therese, Bjørn arguing hours before murder. Bjørn enters clubhouse, where choir sings. Pelle recognises Bjørn; Pelle allows Bjørn to stay. Bjørn starts cuddling Pelle, when he becomes too intimate, Pelle stops embrace.
18	2	"Episode 2" (Afsnit 2)	Mads Kamp Thulstrup	Ina Bruhn, Iben Albinus Sabroe	8 January 2023
Frederik addresses squad: suspect, Bjørn likely hiding in area. Bjørn chops wood for Pelle. Louise meets Anja and her boss, Trine. Anja: could Louise become Maria's mentor? Trine: Maria's struggling, but refuses assistance. Anja: Maria attempted suicide in October. Maria: baby's father, Olivier left months ago. Margit to Frederik: Bjørn lived in shed, alone; Jon knew him well. Maria slashed her wrists; Louise takes Maria to hospital. Anja arrives to assist Maria. Frederik: Bjørn's work locker has bloodstained runners. Frederik asks Jon to attend Aalborg police station, tomorrow. Pelle, Bjørn reminisce about school camp. Louise visits Klaus, who refuses to apologise for abusing her mother. Jon: looked after Maria, Bjørn when Therese abandoned them at Breidablik. Therese arrived when Bjørn was about 12; initially he thrived with farm-life, but during high school became self-isolating. After having baby, Maria refuses to return to Breidablik, remembers Pelle was friendly. Bjørn sees Pelle with young music student. Bjørn asks Pelle: how many did you have sex with? Pelle: they always want it. Bjørn repeatedly punches Pelle. Bjørn's runners has both victims' blood. Louise at clubhouse, tells Bjørn: Maria had baby. Louise asks Bjørn to visit Maria, but he leaves. Louise finds Pelle, dead.
19	3	"Episode 3" (Afsnit 3)	Mads Kamp Thulstrup	Ina Bruhn, Christoffer Barfred Krustrup	15 January 2023
Frederik at clubhouse: Bjørn was seen running north. Louise: spoke to him; left before I discovered Pelle's corpse. Bjørn hides inside shed. Adnan to Frederik: Bjørn stayed with Pelle for 2–3 days, but left most of his effects behind. Louise updates Maria, Anja on Bjørn's status. Louise: police will make public appeal for Bjørn's whereabouts. Frederik finds Pelle's stash of child abuse photos. Maria recalls: Bjørn used to stay over with Pelle. Maria names baby, Sebastian. In shed, police find Bjørn's bloodstained hoodie. Bjørn stole clothes, money, motorbike. Louise: Bjørn felt special by Pelle's attention, later found others were special. Bjørn was rejected: so killed Pelle. Bjørn visits Maria, Sebastian. Bjørn: cannot survive prison, going to Sweden; Maria refuses to accompany him. Maria to Frederik: Bjørn will not go to prison; do not know where he went. Anja to Maria: council decided, you keep Sebastian. Frederik follows up Bjørn's sightings. He checks abandoned buildings; finds stolen motorbike. While searching nearby rooms, motorcyclist rides off. Frederik following by car. Frederik drives through woodlands, along dirt roads, until he crashes. Bjørn helps injured Frederik out of overturned car, before it catches fire. Bjørn takes Frederik's gun. Bjørn rages, then runs off.
20	4	"Episode 4" (Afsnit 4)	Mads Kamp Thulstrup	Ina Bruhn	22 January 2023
Louise at Maria's hospital room, Sebastian's gone. Wife Anna's sceptical of Frederik's car escape story. At hospital, Frederik to police officer, Elena: Bjørn took Sebastian as he wanted Maria to abort baby. Louise to Elena: it's not Bjørn, nor baby's father. Bjørn, in barroom, sees newspaper's wanted photo. Louise: baby abductors are predominantly women, who want baby. Bjørn phones Louise to learn about Sebastian. Bjørn fights men in barroom, brandishes gun, departs. Bjørn hijacks car, drives away. Anja accompanies Maria home. Maria's dispirited: Sebastian's gone. Louise arrives late for Klaus' retirement party. Maria demands Anja leave. Drunken Klaus argues with Louise, slaps her, she slaps him. Louise to Maria: Sebastian's with someone who wants him, will not hurt him. Maria: Bjørn's gone to Sweden. Bjørn considers suicide, but stops. Bar attendant to Frederick: Bjørn arrived early, got drunk. Asked for phone after TV appeal for stolen baby. Police find hijacked car nearby, signs of Bjørn at lake. Louise asks whether Bjørn's Sebastian's father; Maria has Louise leave. Frederik drives Louise home. Bjørn grabs Louise, asks about Sebastian. Frederik holds gun on Bjørn, who takes his gun out. Frederik fires shot, Bjørn collapses. Louise attends Bjørn, Frederik phones ambulance. Bjørn dies.
21	5	"Episode 5" (Afsnit 5)	Jesper W. Nielsen	Ina Bruhn	29 January 2023
Three years later: Frederick asks Louise to assist with the death of cabin resident, Dagmar. Dagmar was possibly pushed down stairs at beachfront. Fellow cabin resident, Arnold claims Dagmar rarely walked anywhere, especially when it's cold. Frederik, Louise interview Dagmar's caseworker, Karim. Dagmar was mentally disabled and used assisted community care. Dagmar recently inherited 140,000kr., however shortly before dying, only few thousands were left. Dagmar spent money on people at cabin owner, Christa's house. Alberte cares for disabled client, Victor. Bertram's assigned as Frederik's partner by boss, Annie. Victor buys expensive postage stamps. Victor running high temperature, Alberte clears his airways. Christa: Dagmar claimed she bought car for trip with friend. Frederik finds car seller; Dagmar bought car with younger blonde woman. Alberte steals Victor's latest purchase. Victor goes into shock. Dagmar's car re-registered to another man, Tue. Frederik, Bertram consider Dagmar's carers, only Alberte is blonde woman under 40. Tue identifies Alberte as car's seller. Louise looks up Maria, who is now studying law. Maria still misses Bjørn, Sebastian. When Frederik, Bertram visit Alberte's address, landlady informs them Alberte left this morning – no forwarding address. Landlady: Victor died last night. Alberte returns to Breidablik and Jon.
22	6	"Episode 6" (Afsnit 6)	Jesper W. Nielsen	Ina Bruhn, Christoffer Barfred Krustrup	5 February 2023
Alberte attempts to seduce Jon, but he fobs her off. Frederik's squad investigate Alberte, Victor's relationship and possible murder. Louise details female serial killers who target disabled victims. Jon asks Alberte to work in farm's store. Frederik to Louise: Alberte periodically leaves Breidablik; works elsewhere. Frederik: approach Maria about Alberte. Alberte to Jon: displays stamp worth 200,000kr. Jon, Alberte have sex. Maria: Alberte fired for stealing jewellery at nursing home. Alberte observes new resident, Patricia, visited by Jon. Klaus' friend, Lasse to Louise: Klaus had terminal cancer. Louise, squad discuss Alberte's previous robberies, no indication of theft from Victor. Alberte scares Patricia: brandishes hunting rifle, claims Jon's her lover. Frederik approaches Jens to assist investigation into Alberte. Margit to Jon: control Alberte, who caused Patricia to leave; not doing her chores. Louise poses as potential Breidablik joiner. Jens: Jon owns Breidablik, entirely; tenants are not co-owners. Louise tours with Jon, who invites her to join. Jens: Jon's business is poor, tenants are leaving, financials are falling. Bertram: Victor was stamp buyer, stamps missing from safe. Louise could move into Breidablik, tonight. Jon injures Alberte for interfering with Patricia. Alberte hides in room, burns stamp; Sees Jon hugging Louise upon arrival.
23	7	"Episode 7" (Afsnit 7)	Jesper W. Nielsen	Ina Bruhn, Iben Albinus Sabroe	12 February 2023
Nightmare: Alberte pushes Louise into lake, holds her under. Awake: Louise meets Margit; sees Frej, who is Sebastian's age. Jon, Alberte: leave Louise alone. Jon to Louise: describes Sebastian, who died in fire, 12 years earlier. Jon has son, Frej. Louise informs Frederik of Frej. Louise joins farmers for evening meal. Jens: Sebastian died in sleep, declared accidental. Louise quizzes Jon about Alberte. Jon sets up Louise's hut generator. Boyfriend, Ulrik wants to know Maria's back-story. Maria hides baby, Sebastian's photos. Margit: Alberte lives in basement, she's Frej's mother. Frederik confirms Frej's parentage. Maria tells Ulrik her past, shows Sebastian's photo. Former Breidablik resident, Max recalls: Jon's power-hungry, Sebastian was welcoming, pleasant. Jon inherited Sebastian's Breidablik share. Alberte searches Louise's effects during dinner: discovers Louise's criminal consultant. Margit suspects Louise of assessing Frej's status for children's services. Alberte informs Jon about Louise. Louise searches Alberte's room, but leaves when Alberte approaches. Jon claims he did not know Victor died, while Alberte listens. Once Jon admits Alberte stole stamp, Alberte locks hut from outside, grabs fuel can. Alberte starts fire with Louise, Jon inside. Alberte runs off. Louise helps Jon out through skylight, but cannot follow: falls to floor. Jon saves her.
24	8	"Episode 8" (Afsnit 8)	Jesper W. Nielsen	Ina Bruhn	19 February 2023
Emergency services give Louise oxygen. Jon discovers Alberte, brings her out; police arrest her. Alberte admits to stealing car, stamp but not to killing Dagmar, Victor. Louise researches Frej's birth. Jon claims: in Odense when Sebastian died. Maria informs Louise: Ulrik broke up with her. Alberte's mother, Karin: Jon controlled Alberte for years. Karin: tenants afraid of being kicked out. Sebastian helped Karin take Alberte away, but Alberte returned. Jon to Frederik: refutes Karin's claim that he had had sex with then, 14-year-old, Alberte. Jon recalls Karin was too drunk to look after Alberte. Maria: Jon slept with Alberte when she was 13-14. Maria: Jon also abused her at that age. Jon, Frej visit Alberte in prison. Jon orders Alberte to confess to killing Sebastian. Maria: Jon's not Sebastian's father. Alberte confesses to Sebastian's homicide. Louise confronts Jon, who denies coercing Alberte, abusing Maria or abducting baby Sebastian. Louise looks for Anja, meets supervisor Trine. Trine: Anja voted against Maria keeping Sebastian, but was outvoted. Anja quite job suddenly, then moved to Austria with husband. Louise, Frederik in Austria: find Anja kidnapped Sebastian. Three months later: Maria raises Sebastian with Louise's help. Frederik: many tenants are leaving Breidablik. Louise, Frederik snuggle.

=== Season four ===
No. overall	No. in season	Title	Directed by	Written by	Original release date
25	1	"Episode 1" (Afsnit 1)	Daniel Kragh-Jacobsen	Lasse Kyed Rasmussen	27 September 2024
Two men armwrestle amongst crowd. Patrick resigns from Legion-5 (L5), leaves gathering. Hooded man shoots Patrick. Gunnar delivers lecture to criminology students. Bjarke: Patrick recently released for accidental homicide. Frederik: turf war with BGF? Bjarke: turf war unlikely; no reprisals. Louise assists Frederik on shooting; Gunnar takes her remaining class. Louise: killer's unemotional first shot, however further shots indicates lost temper. CCTV shows L5 outside party: Patrick, Robin argue. Kim, My travel to cabin. Robin arrives, tells Kim: silence Jimmy's lawyer or My will get hurt. Kim, My return to Melissa. Kim collects gun. Robin to police: no argument or murder involvement. IT expert, Lea: undoctored CCTV shows Robin leaving party after shooting. Jimmy to Kim: cannot recall lawyer's name. Patrick's girlfriend, Amalie: no threats to Patrick before imprisonment. Frederik finds Buspirone, multiple cellphones. Victim's father, Johannes threatened Patrick. At Johannes' workshop, Louise finds files on Patrick. Johannes enters, but runs to his car, which Frederik blocks. Johannes: got drunk at bar; admits sending threatening texts. Frederik: bought drinks at same bar as L5 party. Kim watches Jimmy, Pernille talking. Jimmy: made it up, started rumours, too. Kim realises Jimmy was unsuccessful, Pernille drives away. Gunman kills Pernille. Kim hides his gun.
26	2	"Episode 2" (Afsnit 2)	Daniel Kragh-Jacobsen	Tine Krull Petersen, Lasse Kyed Rasmussen	27 September 2024
Frederik describes Pernille's murder by hooded killer. Ballistics report: cartridges match, same gun. Louise: same killer. Johannes released: could not have killed Pernille. Jacob: Pernille regularly represented L5 members. Robin does not respond to Kim's calls. Frederik, Louise are dating. Pernille was writing book; publisher: Pernille wrote about violent gang's kingpins. Pernille's voicemail: Patrick due to name killer. Patrick's father: Patrick knew about two gang killings, but never told parents. Bjarke: two BGF victims. Kim to teachers: My protected weaker child against bullying boys. Louise has Gunnar takeover one day's lessons, weekly. Louise discusses case with Gunnar. Melissa's upset that Kim works with Robin, who left gift basket. Melissa disbelieves Kim's denials, expels Kim with gift. Frederick scolds Louise for making date but not appearing. Louise: regulars at bar neighbouring killings were never questioned. Bar regular: driver was "Long Jimmy". Kim to Melissa: Robin asked for one-time only job, it's all done. Melissa, Kim reconcile. Bjarke: Jimmy known as L5 hanger-on, no criminal record. Jacob: Pernille met Jimmy. Frederik captures Jimmy. Louise, Frederik interview Jimmy. Jimmy do not remember killings. Louise: killer's already killed two people, who knew: you are next. Upon promise of protection, Jimmy names Kim.
27	3	"Episode 3" (Afsnit 3)	Daniel Kragh-Jacobsen	Christoffer Barfred Krustrup, Lasse Kyed Rasmussen	27 September 2024
Three years ago: Two BGF gang members exit building. Kim, wearing balaclava shoots both men. Jimmy drives Kim away. Present: Louise: historical shootings similar MO to recent ones. Lea identifies Kim's mother. Linda: not seen Kim in five years; argued about Kim's gun use. Linda: received anonymous calls from Swedish number. Lea: number for Malmö recycling factory, but Kim unknown there. Louise: probably changed name. Frederik, Louse interview Malmö factory foreman: employ Kim Erichsen. Frederik advises Swedish authorities. Gunnar accompanies Swedish police, which enter flat – no residents. Kim takes My to cabin. Louise: delay public appeal; interview Melissa first. Frederik overrules Louise's advice. Upon seeing police alert Melissa leaves workplace. Kim sees news; packs gun, bags, tent. Swedish police: Melissa owns cabin. Melissa arrives, disbelieves Kim, attempts to leave. Kim accidentally shoots Melissa. Police arrive at cabin, find Melissa's corpse. Louise: Kim probably returned to Linda. Kim begs Linda to care for My with Linda. Police arrive, Kim hides inside. When police see My, Frederik searches basement. Kim collects knife, waits. Frederik continues searching. Kim breaks through back door, collides with Jacob. Frederik approaches with gun, Kim holds Jacob at knifepoint. When My arrives, Kim drops knife, surrenders.
28	4	"Episode 4" (Afsnit 4)	Daniel Kragh-Jacobsen	Lasse Kyed Rasmussen	27 September 2024
Kim, handcuffed, awaits questioning. Kim asks for his lawyer, Frederik says they can talk until lawyer appears. Louise: tells us your version. Kim: accidentally killed Melissa in struggle. Kim admits to killing two BGF members. Denies killing Patrick, Pernille. Linda, Henrik learn Melissa has no family, My could enter fosterage. Lea checks Kim's phone calls. Kim's lawyer, John meets Frederik. John has photo showing Kim, Melissa together in Malmö at time of Patrick's murder. Kim's car logged leaving Øresund Bridge 29 minutes after Pernille's killed: cannot make it. Lea: Jacob took 38 minutes in light traffic. Louise, Frederik visit Gunnar, Lena. Frederik learns Lena's daughter, Karin died year earlier. My, Linda enter remand. Kim to My: mom died accidentally, police investigating. Lea analyses Malmö photo: taken 18 hours earlier. Louise to Fredrik: 25 minute trip, partly by train. My to Linda: want to live here. Jacob: pistol found on Kim was not used to kill Patrick, Pernille. Team figures Kim used two guns, disposed of at Linda's place near train station. Sniffer dog finds second gun. Jacob: shed gun killed Patrick, Pernille. Kim: do not recognise gun. Kim refuses to confess. Louise's unconvinced: leaving DNA on gun at Linda's is sloppy for Kim's MO.
29	5	"Episode 5" (Afsnit 5)	Olof Spaak	Christoffer Barfred Krustrup, Lasse Kyed Rasmussen	27 September 2024
Fellow prisoner bashes, threatens Kim: Robin will kill My if squeals. My to Frederik: Robin visited cabin with pistol. L5 henchman collects Jimmy. Robin orders Jimmy to inject himself with drug. Kim: Robin had nothing to do with BGF murders. Robin: gang relocate to Nordhavn. Robin's girlfriend, Angelica packs bags. Bjarke: L5 clubhouse empty; bullet holes by BGF. Street seller: Robin's car picked up Jimmy. Bjarke directs Frederik to Robin's car. Police discover Jimmy: overdose death. Louise, Frederick have sex. Lea to Frederik: Angelica used credit card, upon moving. Frederik, Louise: flat's empty, but watched by bazooka-wielding assassin. Blast injures Fredrik. Louise: likely meant for Robin. Gunnar to Louise: tell Frederik how you feel. Louise tends Frederik's wound; tells him she loves him. Squad welcome Louise, Frederik back. Jacob: Jimmy likely forced to overdose. Louise, Frederik conclude Kim could help if My's protected. Kim now confirms Robin ordered BGF members killed; whenever hiding Robin uses Neo House hotel. Robin learns flat was blasted by bazooka. Robin books flight to Marbella, but Angelica returns for son, Hector's teddy bear. Louise, Frederik enter Neo. Louise sees Angelica leaving with bags. Robin at carpark exit, he's shot dead. Hector saw killer.
30	6	"Episode 6" (Afsnit 6)	Olof Spaak	Lasse Kyed Rasmussen	27 September 2024
Hector picks out BGF's Jahfar from Frederick's photographic lineup. Jahfar denies recent killings, bazooka bombing or killing Robin. Louise: Robin likely murdered by serial killer. Frederik ignores Louise's opinion. Jacob: pistol, which killed Robin stolen from Østerbro Gun Club. Jacob views CCTV of break-in, masked men aware of cameras. Gun club's president: thief forced window, knew gun safe code; provides members list. Forensic expert, Anita: 194-cm tall Patrick unable to drive from car seat's position. Robin driving when Line killed. Police raid BGF's HQ; cannot find stolen guns. Bjark discovers used bazooka; arrests its user. Pernille acquired Patrick's short sentence. Louise: consider Line's relatives. Lea: path of Patrick, Robin's phones coincide on accident night. Johannes: Line's funeral attendees prepared photo album. Frederick, Karl dine with Louise. Frederik leaves to check Lea's lead. Frederik phones Louise: investigating Line's ex-boyfriend, Milos. Louise, Karl play video game. Frederik sees shop's CCTV; writes car's numberplate: DLH941 on newspaper. Frederik asks Gunnar to check Swedish numberplate. Gunnar to Frederik: car's in Husum, BGF territory. Frederik phones Louise, but she's asleep. Frederik arrives in Husum. Gunnar checks gun; meets Frederick. Frederik suspects something; both shoot one another. Federik staggers towards his car, where Gunnar shoots him, dead.
31	7	"Episode 7" (Afsnit 7)	Olof Spaak	Christoffer Barfred Krustrup, Lasse Kyed Rasmussen	27 September 2024
Louise sees Frederik placed in body bag; she cries. Gunnar tends wound; burns bandages, clothes. Jacob: same killer as earlier victims. Boss: Jacob head investigation. Jacob to Louise: cannot be part of investigation. Bjark: CCTV shows young man, not shooter, fleeing area. Lea: Frederik spoke to Louise and then Gunnar. Louise follows Fredrick's path to shop. Attendant: Frederik got numberplate from CCTV. Louise takes hard drive. Gunnar to Jacob: Frederik worried about Louise's obsession with case. Gunnar: waited for Frederik at bar. Jacob berates Louise for taking evidence. Lea: footage deleted. Jahfar introduces BGF witness. Manu: two men talking, suddenly shot each other, one in gut, other in left shoulder. Louise confronts Jacob; learns killer has shoulder wound. Jacob gives Louise Frederik's effects. Gunnar to Louise: stop working; deal with grief. Bjark: no unaccounted gun shot wounds. Jacob to Lea: get forensics to shooting scene, look for more blood. Louise discovers car numberplate on newspaper: phones Jacob. Jacob: car rental, from Malmö. Louise: I can check it. Lena sees Gunnar's bleeding: tends his wound from garage accident. Louise returns to Gunnar's place: forgot her phone charger. Discovers bloodied bandages in bathroom bin. Gunnar realises Louise saw his bleeding.
32	8	"Episode 8" (Afsnit 8)	Olof Spaak	Christoffer Barfred Krustrup, Lasse Kyed Rasmussen	27 September 2024
Year ago: Gunnar visits Karin's memorial. Her killer, Adam arrives to place flowers, apologises. Gunnar rages at Adam: one month in prison! Gunnar runs Adam over. Present: Prosecutor, Sara: not enough evidence for Gunnar's trial. Anita to Louise: Gunnar received Patrick, Karin's autopsy reports. Gunnar, Lena plan holiday at cabin. Lea: Adam – no activity for previous year. Jacob: Gunnar's car repaired, service call from Karin's accident site. Gunnar's mechanic to police: claimed he killed deer. Louise: used old spare tyre to sink body. Divers find Adam's corpse in gravel pit. Prosecutor: arrest Gunnar for Adam's murder. Gunnar leaves Louise letter. Police raid Gunnar's home. Gunnar, Lena at cabin. Letter: Gunnar confesses to killings, says he's going to Karin's death site. Jacob travels there. Louise believes Gunnar lied. Lena feels woozy, lies down. Louise sees cabin photos: alerts Jacob. Lena sleeps. Gunnar brings coal fire inside, lies beside Lena. Louise arrives before Swedish police; enters cabin through unlocked door. She tries to wake Lena. Gunnar orders Louise to leave, at gunpoint. Louise shoulder charges Gunnar; grabs his dropped gun. Gunnar blocks way to Lena; attempts to goad her to shoot. Swedish police arrive, subdue him; Lena's saved. Louise attends Frederik's funeral.
