= Dorph =

Dorph is a surname. Notable people with the surname include:

- Anton Dorph (1831–1914), Danish painter
- Bertha Dorph (1875–1960), Danish painter
- Birgitta Karlström Dorph (born 1939), Swedish diplomat
- Christian Dorph (born 1966), Danish author
- Niels Dorph (1681–1758), Danish/Norwegian clergyman
- Viggo Dorph-Petersen (1851–1937), Danish architect
