= Agnete Friis =

Agnete Friis may refer to:

- Agnete Friis (writer) (born 1974), Danish writer
- Agnete Friis (badminton), Danish badminton player
