= Dicte (TV series) =

Danish television series

- Genre: Detective fiction
- Starring: Iben Hjejle; Lars Brygmann
- Opening theme: Dragonborn feat. Jacob Bellens - "The Words"
- Country of origin: Denmark
- Original language: Danish
- No. of seasons: 3
- No. of episodes: 30

Production
- Running time: 45 minutes
- Production company: Miso Film

Original release
- Network: TV 2
- Release: January 7, 2013 – October 24, 2016

Dicte (broadcast in the UK as Dicte – Crime Reporter) is a Danish series starring Iben Hjejle as crime reporter Dicte Svendsen, who has returned to her hometown of Aarhus following a divorce. The series is based on Danish author Elsebeth Egholm's series of novels about the title character. It is broadcast in Denmark on TV2 Danmark.

Season 1 was broadcast in Denmark in 2013, season 2 in 2014, and season 3 in 2016. In the UK the first season was broadcast on More4 in mid-2016 as five feature-length episodes under the title Dicte - Crime Reporter, followed by the second season in mid-2017, and the third starting July 2018. All three seasons are available on Netflix (US) since November 2016.

== Cast and characters ==
Actor	Character
Iben Hjejle	Dicte Svendsen
Lars Brygmann	John Wagner
Lærke Winther Andersen	Anne Skov Larsen
Lene Maria Christensen	Ida Marie
Ditte Ylva Olsen	Bendtsen
Emilie Kruse	Rose Svendsen
Dar Salim	Bo Skytte
Lars Ranthe	Torsten
Tanya Moodie	Grace Tolou Aboka
Thue Ersted Rasmussen	Peter Boutrup
Brinette Odgaard Sorensen	Cecilie Høgh
Peter Schrøder	Kaiser
Sven Ole Schmidt	Kurt Hassing
Ulrik Jeppesen	Christian Willadsen
Jesper Riefensthal	Per Simonsen
Rolf Hansen	Jeppe Vrå
Simon Krogh Stenspil	Darko
Miro Labovic	Mirza
Jelena Bundalovic	Remza
Mikkel Boe Følsgaard	Cato Vinding
Neel Rønholt	My
Søren Malling	Tonni
Stine Stengade	Nina Storm

== Episodes ==
Season	Episodes	Originally released	
Season	Episodes	First released	Last released
1	10	January 7, 2013	March 11, 2013
2	10	September 24, 2014	November 26, 2014
3	10	August 22, 2016	October 24, 2016

=== Season 1 ===
No.	Title	Directed by	Written by	Original release date
1	"Personal - Part 1"	Unknown	Unknown	January 7, 2013
Dicte Svendsen moves back to her hometown, Aarhus, only to find rejection from her parents. She discovers a young woman's body when she is on journalistic assignment for something else. The detective in charge, John Wagner, and she discover a baby trafficking ring.
2	"Personal - Part 2"	Unknown	Unknown	January 14, 2013
Not unexpected, but Dicte and Wagner are hot on the trail of the traffickers, only to find them closer to home.
3	"Deductible - Part 1"	Unknown	Unknown	January 21, 2013
4	"Deductible - Part 2"	Unknown	Unknown	January 28, 2013
5	"Hidden Defects - Part 1"	Unknown	Unknown	February 4, 2013
6	"Hidden Defects - Part 2"	Unknown	Unknown	February 11, 2013
7	"Life and Body - Part 1"	Unknown	Unknown	February 18, 2013
8	"Life and Body - Part 2"	Unknown	Unknown	February 25, 2013
9	"Violence and Power - Part 1"	Unknown	Unknown	March 4, 2013
10	"Violence and Power - Part 2"	Unknown	Unknown	March 11, 2013

=== Season 2 ===
No.	Title	Directed by	Written by	Original release date
1	"Dreams and Diamonds - Part 1"	Unknown	Unknown	September 24, 2014
2	"Dreams and Diamonds - Part 2"	Unknown	Unknown	October 1, 2014
3	"Passion and Handcuffs - Part 1"	Unknown	Unknown	October 8, 2014
4	"Passion and Handcuffs - Part 2"	Unknown	Unknown	October 15, 2014
5	"Closeness and Distance - Part 1"	Unknown	Unknown	October 22, 2014
6	"Closeness and Distance - Part 2"	Unknown	Unknown	October 29, 2014
7	"Means and Ends - Part 1"	Unknown	Unknown	November 5, 2014
8	"Means and Ends - Part 2"	Unknown	Unknown	November 12, 2014
9	"Right and Responsibility - Part 1"	Unknown	Unknown	November 19, 2014
10	"Right and Responsibility - Part 2"	Unknown	Unknown	November 26, 2014

=== Season 3 ===
No.	Title	Directed by	Written by	Original release date
1	"After the Wedding - Part 1"	Unknown	Unknown	August 22, 2016
2	"After the Wedding - Part 2"	Unknown	Unknown	August 29, 2016
3	"In Wagner's Footsteps - Part 1"	Unknown	Unknown	September 5, 2016
4	"In Wagner's Footsteps - Part 2"	Unknown	Unknown	September 12, 2016
5	"When the Mind is Ill - Part 1"	Unknown	Unknown	September 19, 2016
6	"When the Mind is Ill - Part 2"	Unknown	Unknown	September 26, 2016
7	"The Price of Addiction - Part 1"	Unknown	Unknown	October 3, 2016
8	"The Price of Addiction - Part 2"	Unknown	Unknown	October 10, 2016
9	"Every Man Is an Island - Part 1"	Unknown	Unknown	October 17, 2016
10	"Every Man Is an Island - Part 2"	Unknown	Unknown	October 24, 2016

== Early reception ==
1.32 million viewers tuned into the first season's premiere in Denmark. While reviews were mixed, Hjejle received good reviews for her performance. Some critics complained that most of the actors' Copenhagen accents were not authentic for a show set in Aarhus, while other actors' accents were so overblown they seemed caricatures.
