= Ronal the Barbarian =

- Danish theatrical release poster
- Directed by: Kresten Vestbjerg Andersen; Thorbjørn Christoffersen; Philip Einstein Lipski
- Written by: Thorbjørn Christoffersen
- Produced by: Trine Heidegaard
- Starring: Anders Juul; Lærke Winther Andersen
- Edited by: Per Düring Risager
- Music by: Nicklas Schmidt
- Production company: Einstein Film
- Distributed by: Nordisk Film
- Release date: September 29, 2011
- Running time: 89 minutes
- Country: Denmark
- Languages: Danish; English
- Budget: DKK 18 million ($3 million)
- Box office: $2 million

Ronal the Barbarian (Danish: Ronal Barbaren) is a 2011 Danish adult animated fantasy comedy film co-directed by Thorbjørn Christoffersen, Kresten Vestbjerg Andersen and Philip Einstein Lipski, and their third cinema feature.

The film parodies the barbarians and other stereotypes of the sword and sorcery fiction, role-playing games and films such as Conan the Barbarian, Lord of the Rings and the Dungeons & Dragons class, with nods towards the 1980s fantasy boom and its association with traditional heavy metal. It was released in Denmark on September 29, 2011, and was a box office bomb, grossing only $2 million against a budget of $3 million.

== Plot ==
In the land of Metalonia, the demon Zaal is defeated by Kron, the world's mightiest hero. As Kron dies, a hundred warriors drink his blood to gain his strength, becoming the first Barbarians.

10,000 years later, the barbarian clan are the strongest and bravest clan in the world, except for Ronal, a weak but intelligent barbarian who cannot swing an axe or fight. Ronal opts to be the clan's lookout, a relatively easy job as no one dares to attack them. As the barbarians feast, Ronal spots an army led by the evil Lord Volcazar. He attempts to blow the warning horn but his lungs are too weak and the barbarians are taken by surprise. Ronal's uncle Gundar is killed and all the other barbarians are captured. The only two left behind are Ronal and Aliberth, a travelling bard in training.

Ronal travels to an oracle for help and Aliberth decides to accompany him. The oracle reveals that Volcazar wears a magical suit of armour and the only weapon capable of killing him is the sword Kron used to destroy Zaal, which must be wielded by a fearless warrior. Volcazar's sorcerer attempts to resurrect Zaal using the captured barbarians' blood, but the spell fails as one barbarian is missing: Ronal. Volcazar sends his army to find him.

Ronal and Aliberth search for Elvengard, the elven kingdom, to find a library containing the entire world's wisdom, hopefully including the location of Kron's sword. Suddenly, they are confronted by a young shield-maiden named Zandra who beats up any warrior who attempts to challenge her. Ronal tearfully begs Zandra to spare his life, and she reluctantly agrees as he is not a worthy challenger. Aliberth suggests she could be the fearless warrior the oracle spoke of and Zandra agrees to help save the barbarians. They travel towards a village where an elf lives, Elric, an effeminate elven archer, who agrees to guide them. Zandra is challenged by a strong warrior but Ronal's attempt to avoid a fight leads to him duelling instead. He is saved by the arrival of Volcazar's soldiers and they flee in the chaos.

Elric leads them to the gate of the elven kingdom, a dangerous stone passageway. Ronal insists on going around instead, angering the spirits guarding the gate who set off a trap, almost crushing them. Zandra angrily criticizes Ronal for avoiding problems instead of solving them. Ronal decides to sneak inside the library rather than fight the guards and uses an invisibility potion to go unseen (though the potion fails to obscure his testicles). He succeeds in retrieving the location of the sword inside Kron's tomb, impressing Zandra.

That night, Zandra tells Ronal that shield-maidens can only marry men who defeat them in battle, but she was never defeated and was sent away to find a strong man capable of defeating her and hopes that such a man is among the barbarians. Ronal points out being defeated is not what love is and they have a romantic moment where they admit they enjoy talking to each other. Zandra is suddenly captured by Volcazar's soldiers while Ronal and Aliberth end up being kidnapped by buxom Amazonian women, who have never seen men before and spend the whole night using Ronal for breeding purposes, while Aliberth is made to wait his turn.

Zandra attempts to kill Volcazar during her escape but is defeated by his strength and impenetrable armor. Volcazar declares himself her master, forcing her to obey him. Ronal succeeds in escaping the Amazonians, leaving Aliberth behind who wants his turn with the ladies. However his conscience gets the better of him and he escapes as well. Ronal succeeds in finding Kron's tomb and retrieves the sword, only to accidentally drop it. Zandra appears and unwillingly hands the dropped sword to Volcazar. With Ronal captured, his blood and the blood of the other barbarians are used to resurrect Zaal, who combines his power with Volcazar, transforming into Zaal's demon form.

Aliberth sneaks inside the fortress and retrieves Kron's sword, passing it to Ronal, who accidentally succeeds in freeing the other barbarians to battle Volcazar's army. Volcazar orders Zandra to execute Ronal but she refuses to kill someone who actually cares about her. Ronal attacks Volcazar with Kron's sword and succeeds in stabbing the same weak spot on his skull Kron once did, destroying both Volcazar and Zaal.

With Ronal believed to be dead, the barbarians honor him as the bravest barbarian in history only for Ronal to suddenly wake up, having only been unconscious. As the barbarians celebrate, Zandra kisses Ronal declaring she no longer needs a warrior to defeat her as Ronal has already conquered her heart. They return to the barbarian village where Ronal and Zandra are married, Aliberth becomes popular with the barbarian ladies and Elric becomes the barbarian's new masseuse.

== Cast ==
- Anders Juul as Ronal the Barbarian
- Lærke Winther Andersen as Zandra
- Lars Mikkelsen as Lord Volcazar
- Hadi Ka-Koush as Alibert
- Brian Lykke as Elric
- Peter Aude as Gundar
- Lars Bom as Gorak
- Jens Jacob Tychsen as Gu'ra Zul
- Ole Thestrup as The Oracle
- Preben Kristensen as Master Florian
- Ole Ernst as Narrator
- L.O.C. as Tango The Bar-Hunk
- Brigitte Nielsen as Amazon Queen
- Jesper Binzer as Drunk Guy
- Bodil Jørgensen as Bar-fe
- Szhirley as Amazon Guard

The voice acting includes Brigitte Nielsen and Sven-Ole Thorsen in the original Danish and Ben Bledsoe, Dee Snider, Ashley Acarino, Pierce Cravens, and Louis Lombardi in the English-language dub.

== See also ==
- List of adult animated feature films
