= Miso Film =

Danish production company

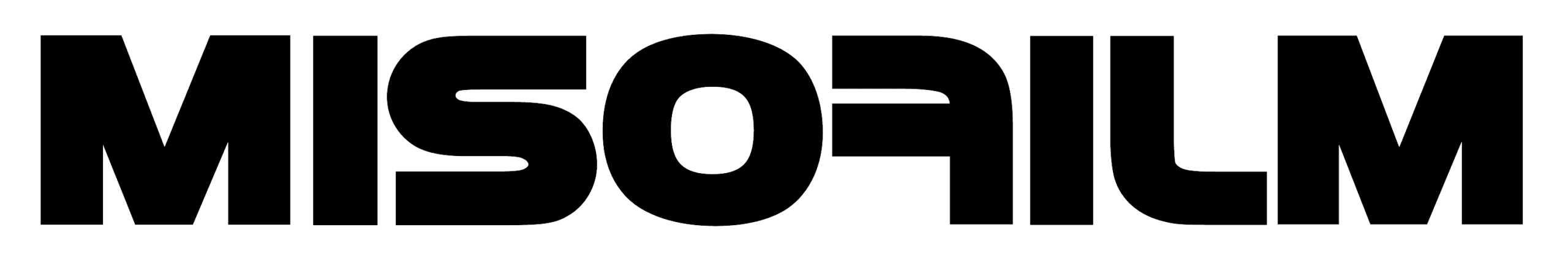
- Company type: Subsidiary
- Founded: 2004; 22 years ago
- Founder: Jonas Allen; Peter Bose
- Headquarters: Copenhagen, Denmark
- Products: Feature films; Television series
- Parent: Fremantle (2014–present)
- Website: misofilm.dk

Miso Film is a Danish film and television production company owned by Fremantle and based in Copenhagen. It was founded by Jonas Allen and Peter Bose in 2004.

== History ==
Jonas Allen and Peter Bose initially met at Per Holst Film/Nordisk Film in 1999. Later, they continued their collaboration with FilmPeople and Yellow Bird, before setting up their own company in 2005. In November 2014, FremantleMedia acquired 51 percent of Miso Film.

In March 2025, it was announced that Miso Film had appointed producer Ruth Reid to oversee their TV series production in Denmark, Norway, and Sweden, starting on 1 May. Reid had previously worked as an in-house producer for HBO Nordic, followed by a stint as creative associate at Netflix Nordic. Reid was born in Scotland but had lived and worked in Sweden for many years.

== Selected productions ==
=== Film ===
- Max Manus: Man of War (2008)
- The Candidate (2008)
- Jensen & Jensen (2011)
- Ginger & Rosa (2012)
- Fortidens skygge (2012)
- Dannys Dommedag (2014)
- Lang historie kort (Long Story Short) (2015)
- Small Town Killers (2017)
- The Way to Mandalay (2018)
- Iqbal & the Indian Jewel (2018)
- 438 days (2019)
- I'll be home for Christmas (2019)
- Selvhenter (Heavy Load) (2019)
- Skyggen i mit øje / The Bombardment (2021)
- Blasted (2022)

=== Television ===
- Varg Veum (2008)
- Those Who Kill (2011) and Darkness: Those Who Kill (2019, 2021, 2023)
- Dicte (2013)
- 1864 (2014)
- The Rain (2018)
- Heksejakt (Witch Hunt) (2020)
- The Investigation (2020)
- Elves (2021)
- Face to Face (2019, 2021, 2023)
- Box 21 (2021)
- Cell 8 (2022)
- Lust (2022)
