= Simon Pasternak =

Danish author (b. 1971)

Simon Pasternak (born 1971) is a Danish author and publisher. He holds a master's degree in Comparative Literature from the University of Copenhagen.

Together with his author colleague Christian Dorph Simon Pasternak is writing a series of crime novels that all take place in the last fourth of the twentieth century and in which historical events and people play a crucial role.

In 2014 Pasternak was awarded the Harald Mogensen Prize by the Danish Criminal Academy (Det danske Kriminalakademi, DKA) for his novel Death Zones.

== Published works ==
- Oqaluttuartoq Jens Rosing/Fortælleren Jens Rosing (1999)
- Om et øjeblik i himlen (2005). Crime fiction, written by Christian Dorph & Simon Pasternak
- Afgrundens rand (Edge of the Abyss) (2007). Crime fiction, written by Christian Dorph & Simon Pasternak
- Jeg er ikke her (I'm Not Here) (2010). Crime fiction, written by Christian Dorph & Simon Pasternak
