= Gretelise Holm =

Danish author and journalist

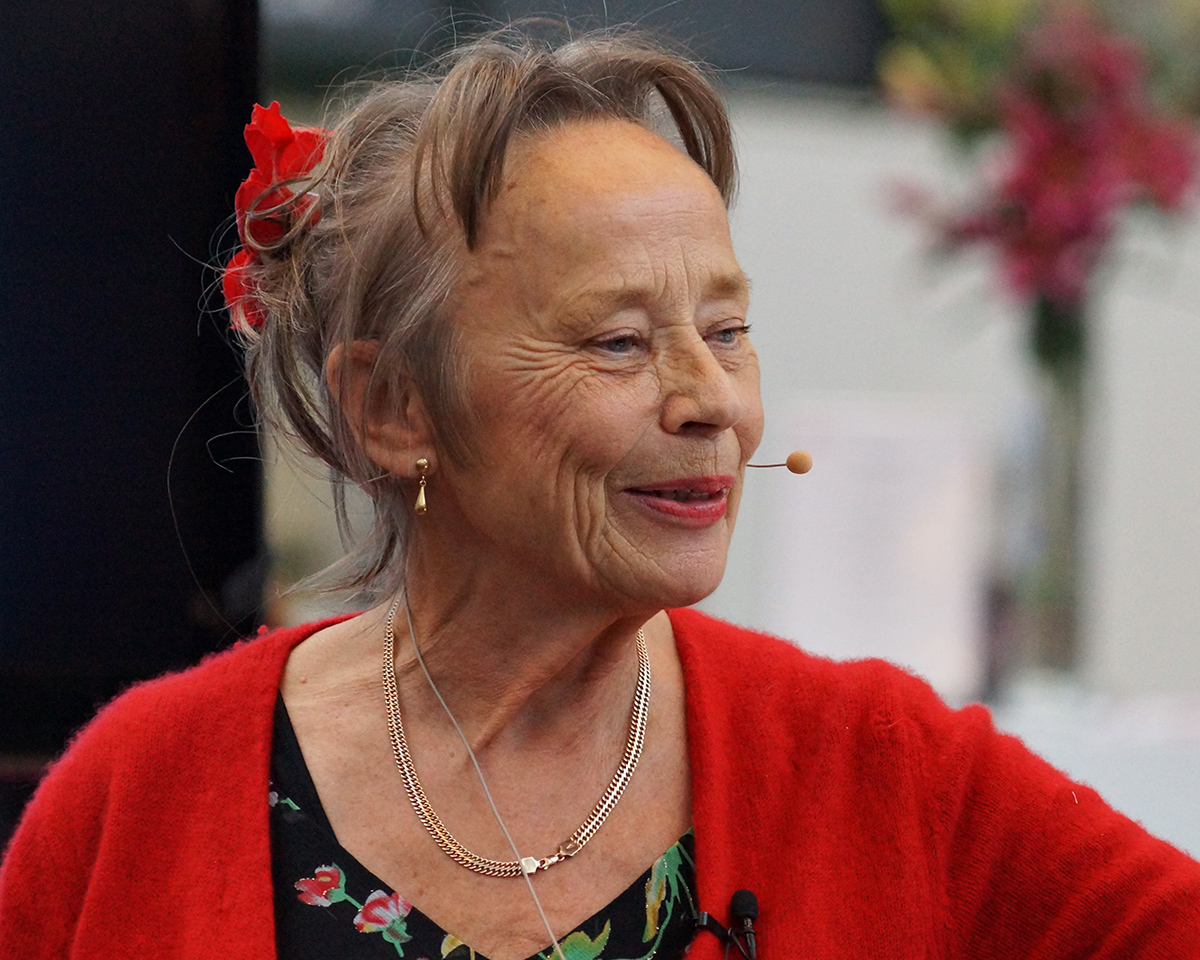
- Gretelise Holm in 2012
- Born: March 22, 1946 (age 80); Rejsby-Ballum, Denmark
- Occupation: Journalist

Gretelise Holm (born 22 March 1946 in Tønder) is a Danish journalist and a writer of both fiction and non-fiction. After working as a columnist for the Danish newspapers Berlingske and Politiken, she taught at the Danish School of Media and Journalism in Aarhus (1983–87). The four years she spent with her husband in Zimbabwe (1993–97) significantly influenced her writing, increasing her interest in women's rights and gender disparities. She has been particularly successful as a novelist, embarking on her Karin Sommer crime series in 2002 with Paranoia.

== Early life ==
Born on 22 March 1946 at Tønder in the south of Jutland, Gretelise Holm was the second-oldest child of the family's eight children. She was brought up in a poverty-stricken home by a deeply religious mother, who nevertheless was successful in having the municipality cover her daughter's educational expenses. As a result, on leaving the realskole in Kolding at the age of 14, Holm was able to earn her own living.

== Career ==
When she was 17, Holm trained as a journalist at the Kolding Folkeblad. She then moved to Copenhagen, where she worked for Berlingske and Børsen, after which she spent 12 years as a columnist with Politiken. From 1983, she taught at the Danish School of Media and Journalism in Aarhus until 1987.

In 1981, she published her first book, Ud går du nu på livets vej: om at være ung (transl. Now You Go Out on the Path of Life: About Being Young). This initial publication was followed by many more non-fiction works, as well as short stories. From 1993 to 1997, Holm lived in Zimbabwe with her husband, which significantly influenced her writing and increased her interest in women's rights and gender disparities.

After returning from Zimbabwe, she worked for a few years as a journalist for the journal Sygeplejersken (The Nurse). She then turned full time to writing as a novelist. She published her first crime novel, Mercedes-Benz Syndromet (1998), which won the debut crime novel award from Det Danske Kriminalakademi (Danish Criminal Academy). This was later followed by Paranoia (2002), the first book in a series about the journalist Karen Sommer.

In support of her feminist interests, in 2008 she published Hvorfor er feminister så snerpede? (Why are feminists so snarky?).

== Marriage ==
Gretelise Holm was happily married for 44 years to the clinical immunologist Knut Wallevik (1933–2015). The couple had two daughters together.

== Awards and honours ==
- 1980: Holm received the PH Prize, reflecting the interests of Poul Henningsen.
- 1998: Mercedes-Benz Syndromet won the debut crime novel award from Det Danske Kriminalakademi (Danish Criminal Academy).
- 2020: Holm was awarded the Harald Mogensen Prize for Dødfunden.
