= Those Who Kill =

Danish crime television series

- Danish DVD cover
- Also known as: Den som dræber
- Genre: Crime drama Thriller
- Created by: Elsebeth Egholm
- Starring: Laura Bach; Jakob Cedergren; Lars Mikkelsen; Lærke Winther Andersen; Frederik Meldal Nørgaard
- Country of origin: Denmark
- Original language: Danish
- No. of seasons: 1
- No. of episodes: 10 (Denmark); 6 (UK, Germany)

Production
- Running time: 60 min. (Denmark); 120 min. (UK, Germany); 92 min. (Fortidens skygge)

Original release
- Network: TV2
- Release: 13 March – 15 May 2011

Related
- Those Who Kill (2019 TV series)

Those Who Kill (Danish: Den som dræber) is a Danish crime TV series from 2011, which follows a fictitious unit within Copenhagen Police which specialises in investigating serial murders. The series was aired as five two-part stories in Denmark (i.e. ten episodes in total), but has aired as five feature-length episodes in most other countries. A separate 92 minutes feature film, Fortidens skygge, which forms a continuation and ending of the series, premiered in Danish cinemas on 15 March 2012, and is being aired as the final episode or episodes of the series in many other countries, such as the UK and Germany.

The series is created and written by Elsebeth Egholm and Stefan Jaworski, with various other screenwriters helping out as episode writers, among them Siv Rajendram, Rikke De Fine Licht and Morten Dragsted. Directors have been Birger Larsen, Niels Nørløv and Kasper Barfoed. The series is a Danish-German-Swedish-Norwegian co-production.

Although originally planned to run for several seasons, Danish TV2 announced in October 2011 that there would be no further seasons made, due to falling viewer shares after the first few episodes. TV2 programming manager Keld Reinicke stated that, "We have no plans to continue the series as it never gave us the audience share we expected in Denmark".

Announced in April 2018, Those Who Kill returned to the screens in 2019 on the Viaplay streaming service and the TV3 network across Scandinavia, with a new separate season which starred Kenneth M Christensen and Natalie Madueño.

== Cast and characters ==
Actor	Character	Episode(s)
Laura Bach	Katrine Ries Jensen	All (team member)
Jakob Cedergren	Thomas Schaeffer	All (team member)
Lars Mikkelsen	Magnus Bisgaard	All (team member)
Lærke Winther Andersen	Mia Vogelsang	All (team member)
Frederik Meldal Nørgaard	Stig Molbeck	All (team member)
Iben Dorner	Benedicte Schaeffer	All (team member)
Carsten Bjørnlund	Adam Krogh	Liget i skoven
David Dencik	Lars Werner	Utopia
Stine Stengade	Andrea Lorck	Utopia
Ulrich Thomsen	Martin Høegh	Ondt blod
Kim Bodnia	Jacov Yugorski	Øje for øje
Thomas Levin	David Vergunov	Øje for øje
Alexandre Willaume	Simon	Dødens kabale
Marie Askehave	Maria	Dødens kabale
Mille Dinesen	Signe	Dødens kabale

== Episodes ==
Danish episode title	First broadcast in Denmark (TV2)	Danish viewers TNS Gallup	First broadcast in Sweden (TV4)	Swedish viewers MMS	English episode title	First broadcast in the UK (ITV3)
Liget i skoven	13 March 2011 (part 1); 20 March 2011 (part 2)	1,477,000 (part 1); 1,329,000 (part 2)	10 October 2011 (part 1); 17 October 2011 (part 2)	NA (part 1); 815,000 (part 2)	Corpse in the Woods	23 February 2012
Utopia	27 March 2011 (part 1); 3 April 2011 (part 2)	1,155,000 (part 1); 1,156,000 (part 2)	24 October 2011 (part 1); 31 October 2011 (part 2)	825,000 (part 1); NA (part 2)	Utopia	1 March 2012
Ondt blod	10 April 2011 (part 1); 17 April 2011 (part 2)	1,026,000 (part 1); 906,000 (part 2)	14 November 2011 (part 1); 21 November 2011 (part 2)	NA (part 1); NA (part 2)	Bad Blood	8 March 2012
Øje for øje	24 April 2011 (part 1); 1 May 2011 (part 2)	619,000 (part 1); 859,000 (part 2)	28 November 2011 (part 1); 5 December (part 2)	NA (part 1); NA (part 2)	An Eye for an Eye	15 March 2012
Dødens kabale	8 May 2011 (part 1); 15 May 2011 (part 2)	801,000 (part 1); 913,000 (part 2)	12 December 2011 (part 1); 19 December 2011 (part 2)	NA (part 1); 665,000	A Deadly Game	22 March 2012
Fortidens skygge	Cinema premiere: 15 March 2012	NA	NA	NA	Shadow of the Past	29 March 2012

== Broadcast ==
Those Who Kill has been sold to broadcasters in more than 25 countries. In Germany 3.8 million viewers watched the final episode on channel ZDF. In the United Kingdom, the series has been shown by commercial channel ITV3, and by the BBC iPlayer.

== Remakes ==
=== American remake ===
In January 2012, the A&E television channel announced that it had bought the rights to develop a US version of the series. A pilot episode began filming in Pittsburgh in December 2012, produced by Fox 21 and written by Glen Morgan. The pilot starred Chloë Sevigny as police detective Catherine Jensen, and James D'Arcy as forensic profiler Thomas Schaeffer. In April 2013, A&E announced that it had greenlit a 10-episode first season of the series, which would begin production in Pittsburgh in late 2013. The series premiered on A&E on 3 March 2014.

Although the series received poor critical reviews, it got positive viewer reviews.

A&E pulled the series after poor opening ratings plunged even more for the second episode, then moved it to Lifetime Movie Network (LMN), where it was not renewed for a second season.

=== Dutch remake ===
In 2016 a Dutch remake was launched called 'De Jacht' (the hunt). Only six episodes were made and actress Loes Haverkort, who played inspector Lea Smit was nominated for a 'Golden Calf' award in the section 'best actress TV-drama.
