= Satisfaction 1720 =

2016 Danish film

- Danish: Tordenskjold & Kold
- Directed by: Henrik Ruben Genz
- Written by: Erlend Loe
- Produced by: Lars Bredo Rahbek
- Starring: Jakob Oftebro; Martin Buch
- Music by: Henrik Skram
- Production company: Nimbus Film
- Release date: 28 January 2016 (Denmark)
- Running time: 93 minutes
- Country: Denmark
- Language: Danish

Satisfaction 1720 (Danish: Tordenskjold & Kold) is a Danish feature film directed by Henrik Ruben Genz. The drama takes place in 1720 and follows the acclaimed Danish-Norwegian Vice-Admiral Peter Tordenskjold at the end of his life, after the Great Nordic War, when he embarks on a proposal journey with his butler Kold.

The script is written by Erlend Loe. The film is produced by Nimbus film with co-producers in the Czech Republic, Norway and Sweden.

== Plot ==
Tordenskjold has been appointed Vice-Admiral after the war against Sweden. He is extremely restless after a period of the successful naval battles. He is a prominent hero in Denmark and a draw in the corporate world. His butler Kold works as the hero's impressionario and arranges his visits to suitable companies. Kold also tries to arrange a marriage for him with Ms. Norris, an English noblewoman. To meet her, he travels through southern Jutland, to some of the great cities of northern Germany. But when he reaches Hanover, he is tricked into a duel, apparently arranged by vengeful Swedes.

== Cast ==
- Jakob Oftebro as Tordenskjold
- Martin Buch as butler Kold
- Natalie Madueño as Leonora Ployart
- Kenneth M. Christensen as captain Ployart
- David Dencik as doctor Mabuse
- Björn Kjellman as Axel Staël von Holstein
- Martin Greis as king Frederick IV of Denmark
