= Thomas Hwan =

Danish actor (born 1982)

Thomas Hwan (born 4 May 1982), full name Thomas Hwan Hoegh Andersen, is a South Korean-Danish actor, best known to international audiences for his appearances in the Danish TV crime series Bedrag (Follow the Money).

Hwan was adopted from Korea by Danish parents, and graduated from the Danish National Theatre School in 2007. He has played Romeo at the Royal Danish Theatre, where he co-founded the experimental "Red Room" stage.

His girlfriend is Danish actress Johanne Louise Schmidt. They have a daughter named Allie.

Hwan has a leading role in the 2018 film The Return, an international production directed by Malene Choi Jensen, with dialogue in Danish, Korean and English.
