= Harald Mogensen Prize =

Danish literary award for detective novels

The Harald Mogensen Prize (Danish Harald Mogensen-prisen) is a Danish literary award for detective novels awarded by the Danish Criminal Academy (Det danske Kriminalakademi, DKA). It was founded in 2006 and was first awarded in 2007. It is named after Danish author, editor, journalist and critic Harald Mogensen who was awarded The Danish Criminal Academy diploma in 1993.

== Prize recipients ==
- 2024 Jens Henrik Jensen: Pilgrim
- 2023 Torben Munksgaard: Damevennens død
- 2022 Morten Hesseldahl: Mørket under isen
- 2021 Jenny Lund Madsen: Tredive dages mørke
- 2020 Gretelise Holm for Dødfunden
- 2019 Jesper Stein: Solo (crime)
- 2018 Elsebeth Egholm: I always find you (crime)
- 2017 Lars Kjædegaard: What is worse
- 2016 Ane Riel: Resin (novel)
- 2015 Thomas Rydahl: The Hermit (crime)
- 2014 Simon Pasternak: Death Zones (novel)
- 2013 Michael Katz Krefeld: Black snow falls (novel)
- 2012 Erik Valeur: The Seventh Child (novel)
- 2011 Susanne Staun: The Room of Death (novel)
- 2010 Jussi Adler-Olsen: Bottle mail from P. (crime)
- 2009 Lene Kaaberbøl and Agnete Friis: The boy in the suitcase (crime)
- 2008 Morten Hesseldahl: Dragons over Kabul (novel)
- 2007 Kirsten Holst: Her brother's guardian
