= Follow the Money (TV series) =

Danish television series

- Title card
- Genre: Financial thriller Crime drama
- Created by: Jeppe Gjervig Gram
- Written by: Anders August; Jannik Taj Mosholt; Jeppe Gjervig Gram
- Directed by: Per Fly
- Starring: Nikolaj Lie Kaas; Thomas Bo Larsen; Natalie Madueño; Esben Smed
- Theme music composer: Tobias Wilner
- Opening theme: Toydrum and Gavin Clark (Season 3)
- Composer: Tobias Wilner
- Country of origin: Denmark
- Original language: Danish
- No. of seasons: 3
- No. of episodes: 30

Production
- Executive producer: Piv Bernth
- Producer: Anders Toft Andersen
- Running time: 58 min
- Production company: Danmarks Radio (DR)

Original release
- Network: DR1

Follow the Money (Danish: Bedrag) is a Danish television financial crime thriller. The first series of ten episodes is set in the renewable energy business in Denmark. It was broadcast in Denmark in January 2016. The second series was broadcast in October–November 2016, continuing with most of the characters from the first series, but with the main focus on a bank practising P2P lending and their attempted takeover by a bank whose chair, Knud Christensen, was behind the fraud case investigated in the first season. The third series, again ten episodes, was aired in January 2019. It focuses on money laundering with two of the main characters from the previous two series.

== Main cast ==
Actor	Character	Seasons		
Actor	Character	1	2	3
Thomas Bo Larsen	Mads Justesen	Main	Main	
Thomas Hwan	Alf Rybjerg	Main	Main	Main
Natalie Madueño	Claudia Moreno	Main	Main	
Esben Smed	Nicky Rasmussen	Main	Main	Main
Nikolaj Lie Kaas	Alexander "Sander" Sødergren	Main		
Lucas Hansen	Bimse	Recurring	Recurring	
Julie Grundtvig Wester	Lina	Recurring	Recurring	
Waage Sandø	Knud Christensen	Recurring	Recurring	
Claes Ljungmark	"The Swede"	Main	Main	
David Dencik	Simon Absalonsen		Main	
Sonja Richter	Amanda Absalonsen		Main	
Søren Malling	Hans Peter		Guest	
Thomas W. Gabrielsson	Martin Enevolden		Guest	
Maria Rich	Anna Berg Hanssen			Main
Marijana Jankovic	Stine			Recurring
Marie Askehave	Isa			Recurring
Bijan Daneshmand	Abbas			Guest
Sajjad Delafrooz	Aslam	Guest		

== Broadcast ==
The first series, which has dialogue in Danish, Swedish and English, was broadcast subtitled in the UK on BBC Four from March 2016 under the title Follow the Money with two episodes being shown back-to-back. In Finland, the first episode was broadcast on 12 April 2016 on Yle Fem, subtitled in Swedish and Finnish. In The Netherlands, the first episode was broadcast on 7 March 2016, under the title Follow the Money, subtitled in Dutch. In Belgium, Canvas has broadcast the series under the title Follow the Money with Dutch subtitles between 12 March 2016 and 9 April 2016. It premiered in Canada on CBC on 18 June 2016. It has also been shown on SBS in Australia, concluding in June 2016. It was shown in Portugal on RTP2 on 7 December 2016. In Slovenia it was broadcast on Radiotelevizija Slovenija from 15 May 2017 with Slovene subtitles.

In the UK, series 2 broadcast began on 4 March 2017 on BBC Four with two episodes being shown back-to-back.

In Denmark, series 3 broadcast began on 6 January 2019 on DR1; in Finland from 10 March 2019 on Yle Teema & Fem and in the UK from 6 April 2019 on BBC Four with two episodes being shown back-to-back. In Portugal, it was broadcast from 3 September 2019 on RTP2.

== Reception ==
Reviewers from several major Danish newspapers were critical of the second season. The series' cast and technical aspects such as photography were praised, while the story and the development of the characters were criticized. Berlingske, Ekstra Bladet, Politiken and Jyllands-Posten awarded the second season three stars, while BT awarded it four stars.

== Awards ==
Award Show	Year	Category	Nominee(s)	Result
C21 International Drama Awards	2016	Best non-English language drama series	Follow the Money I	Won
Robert Awards	2017	Best TV series	Jeppe Gjervig Gram, Anders Toft Andersen, Per Fly	Won
Robert Awards	2017	Best Actor – TV series	Thomas Bo Larsen	Won
Robert Awards	2017	Best Actress – TV series	Natalie Madueño	Nominated
Robert Awards	2017	Best Supporting Actor – TV series	Esben Smed	Won
Robert Awards	2017	Best Supporting Actor – TV series	Nikolaj Lie Kaas	Nominated
Robert Awards	2017	Best Supporting Actress – TV series	Line Kruse	Nominated
