= May Simón Lifschitz =

Danish-Argentinian actress

May Simón Lifschitz is an actress and transgender model of Danish and Argentinian descent. She is known from Netflix's Warrior Nun, where she plays Chanel, and Danish productions Wild Witch, Yes No Maybe, and Christian IV.

== Career ==
Lifschitz began her modeling career when she was 16. She worked on campaigns for Adidas, and became the second transgender model to work on a Victoria's Secret campaign, following Valentina Sampaio.

She began acting in 2015. Show writer David Hayter told a fan that Lifschitz was pleased with the Warrior Nun script specifically because it doesn't mention that she is transgender, which is very unusual for transgender roles. She also plays Forcer Wallik in Apple TV's Foundation.

== Personal life ==
Lifschitz was born in Corrientes, Argentina but grew up in Denmark. Her mother is Danish and her father is Argentinian, and she holds a Danish citizenship.
