= Wildwitch =

Danish children's/juvenile fantasy novel series

- Wildfire – 2010; Oblivion – 2011; Life Stealer – 2011; Bloodling – 2012; Enemy’s Blood – 2013; The Return – 2014
- Author: Lene Kaaberbøl
- Original title: Vildheks
- Translator: Charlotte Barslund
- Illustrator: Anders Walter, Rohan Daniel Easton
- Cover artist: Anders Walter
- Country: Denmark
- Language: Danish
- Discipline: Fantasy children's literature/juvenile literature
- Publisher: Alvilda, Pushkin Press
- Published: 2011–2014
- Published in English: 2016
- No. of books: 6

Wildwitch (Danish: Vildheks) is a children's/juvenile fantasy novel series published by Danish-born writer, Lene Kaaberbøl, from 2011 to 2014. The six-part series had its first four novels translated into English by Charlotte Barslund in 2016. A Danish feature film, Wild Witch (Vildheks), based on the series was released in 2018. The stories centre on Clara, a 12-year-old, who has a love of animals and nature. She struggles to become a wildwitch and encounters deadly enemies, Chimera and Bravita Bloodling.

== Book series ==
Wildwitch is six-part book series.

=== Wildfire (Ildprøven) – 2010 ===
The first book, Wildfire (Ildprøven) introduces the central character, Clara, a 12-year-old Danish student. She has a friendship with Oscar – they share a love of animals and nature. Oscar is considered "weird" by the popular students as he challenges teachers in class. Clara encounters a black cat, which scratches her cheek. Her mother, Mille, takes her to a remote forest to her previously unacknowledged aunt Isa. After treating her wounds, Isa starts to instruct her in the ways of a wildwitch and helps protect her from evil witch, Chimera. Guardian Australia's reviewer summarised, "a stunning and wonderful short novel for kids."

=== Oblivion (Viridians blod) – 2011 ===
The second book, Oblivion, has Clara attacked by wild animals, which have been enslaved by the evil Chimera. With the help of her wildfriend and guardian, Cat, she defends herself and learns more about her wildwitch powers. Love Reading's Andrea Reece observed, "Young readers will love these stories, the magical world is full of just the right sort of dangers and mystery, while the bonds Clara forms with animals and the wild world are just as satisfying."

=== Life Stealer (Kimæras hævn) – 2011 ===
The third book, Life Stealer, finds Clara extending her powers while being careful not to be drawn into the minds of animals locked in their predator-prey roles. She receives more training from aunt Isa. A new set of dangers develops from Chimera's interfering with wild magic. John Millen of South China Morning Post finds the author treads a familiar path and warns that some sections are "a bit strong for the readership of this otherwise inoffensive mid-grade."

=== Bloodling (Blodsungen) – 2012 ===
In the fourth book, Bloodling, Clara must finish a difficult task to become a fully realized wildwitch. A set of attacks on her family leads to a confrontation with Chimera's boss, the undead witch Bravita Bloodling. Kirkus Reviews' writer summarised, "There’s plenty of action, but it's hard to tell where this episode fits into the main storyline (if there is one)."

=== Enemy’s Blood (Fjenblod) – 2013 ===
The fifth book, Enemy's Blood, Clara becomes increasingly troubled by the death of numerous ravens, which threatens the ruling council of wildwitches, the Raven Mothers. She has to help them and protect the last raven in the world from Bravita.

=== The Return (Genkommeren) – 2014 ===
The sixth book, The Return, finds Bravita Bloodling making malicious and threatening moves against Clara and all other wildwitches. Bloodling's evil witches combine to try to return her fully into the world. They would end natural wild magic and bring back the unbearable dark.

== Film adaptation ==
On October 11, 2018, the film version of Wild Witch (Vildheks) was issued in Denmark. It was released to streaming services on February 14, 2020. It stars Gerda Lie Kaas as Clara a wildwitch apprentice, Sonja Richter as her aunt and wildwitch instructor Isa, Vera Mi Bachmann as fellow apprentice Kahla, Signe Egholm Olsen as her mother Mille, May Lifschitz as the chief antagonist Chimera and Albert Werner as Clara's long-term school friend Oscar. Director Kaspar Munk also worked on the script with Poul Berg and Bo Hansen.

Filming had started in May 2017 on location in Hungary. Gerda Lie Kaas is the daughter of Danish actor Nikolaj Lie Kaas and granddaughter of actor-director Preben Kaas and actor Anne Marie Lie. Danny Brogan of Common Sense Media felt, "[it] is an uneven Danish movie... [with] messages of self acceptance and standing up against bullies, but there are also many scary moments, most notably involving the evil witch [Chimera]."
