= Lene Kaaberbøl =

Danish author

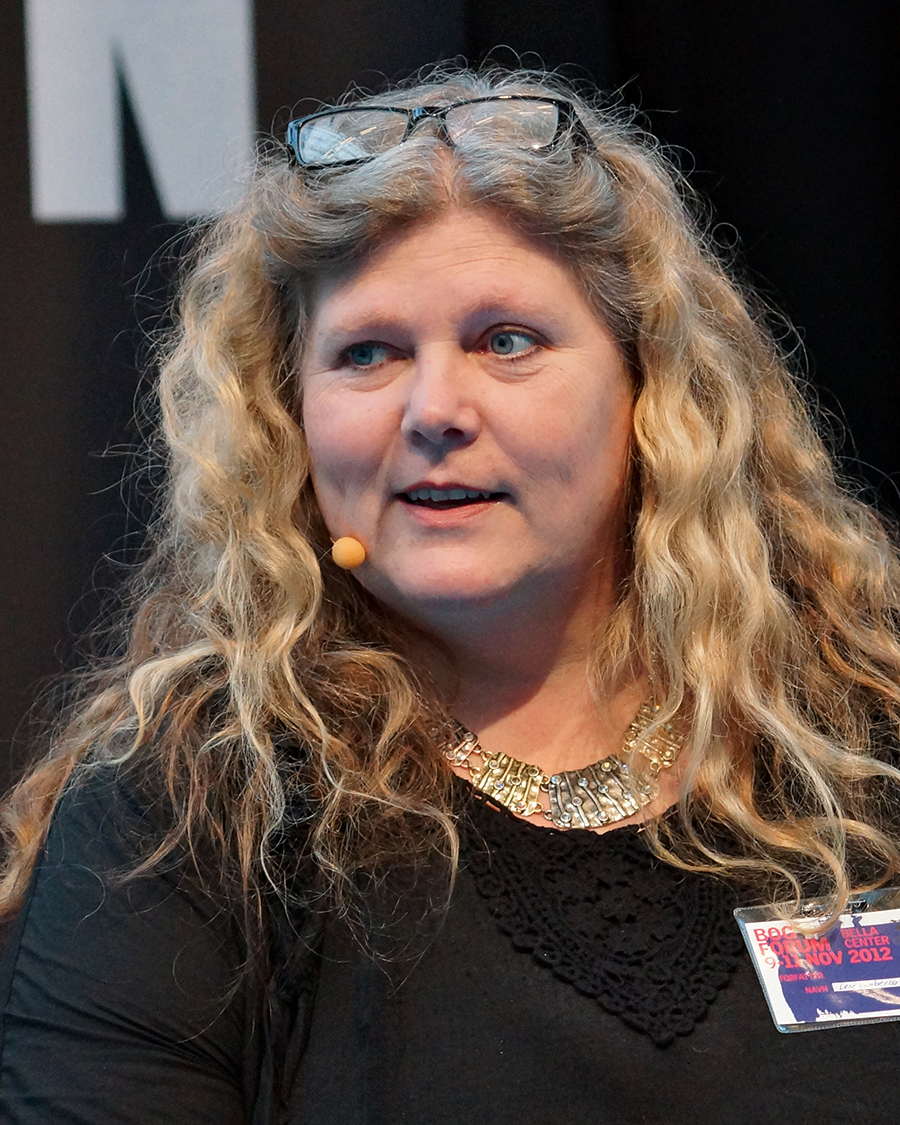
- Born: March 24, 1960 (age 66); Copenhagen, Denmark
- Occupation: Author

Lene Kaaberbøl (born in 1960) is a Danish writer born in Copenhagen, Denmark. Her work primarily consists of children's fantasy series and crime fiction for adults. She received the Nordic Children's Book Prize in 2004. In 2009 Kaaberbøl with her co-author Agnete Friis was awarded the Harald Mogensen Prize by the Danish Criminal Academy (Det danske Kriminalakademi, DKA) for novel The boy in the suitcase. Kaaberbøl's most famous works include the Shamer Chronicles book series, especially the first installment The Shamer's Daughter, and her Wildwitch (Vildheks) book series (2011–2014), the former of which had the first and third book adapted into two Danish theatrical children's live-action fantasy films, and the latter series providing the basis for a Danish live-action children's fantasy film in 2018.

== Biography ==
Born in Copenhagen, Lene Kaaberbøl grew up in the small town of Malling, in the countryside south of Aarhus in Jutland. She got her first book published when she was only 15 years old. It was also the first book of what became the Tina series and it has been translated into Norwegian and Swedish. Graduated from Aarhus Katedralskole and educated with a degree in both English and Dramaturgy from Aarhus University, she has worked as a high school teacher and a translator, but her working life has been very diverse and she also made a living as a cleaning lady at one time. Having resided on Zealand, Kaaberbøl now lives in Sark, in the Channel Islands, close to France.

== Bibliography ==
=== Translated works ===
==== The Shamer Chronicles ====
- The Shamer's Daughter (Henry Holt and Company, 2006)
- The Shamer's Signet (Henry Holt and Company, 2007)
- The Serpent Gift (Henry Holt and Company, 2007)
- The Shamer's War (Henry Holt and Company, 2008)

==== Katriona ====
- Silverhorse (Macmillan Children's Books, 2008)
- Midnight (Macmillan Children's Books, 2009)

==== W.I.T.C.H. ====
- When Lightning Strikes (Volo, 2004)
- Enchanted Music (Volo, 2004)
- Heartbreak Island (Volo, 2005)
- The Cruel Empress (Volo, 2005)
- Stolen Spring (Volo, 2005)
- Stenfalken (2003)
- Ørnekløer (2003)
- Uglens skygge (2003)
- Den gyldne fønix (2003)

==== Nina Borg (with Agnete Friis) ====
- The Boy in the Suitcase (Soho Crime, 2011)
- Invisible Murder (Soho Crime, 2012)
- Death of a Nightingale (Soho Crime, 2013)
- The Considerate Killer (Soho Crime, 2016)

==== Madelein Karno ====
- Doctor Death (2015)
- A lady in shadows

==== Wildwith ====
- Wildfire (Pushkin Press, 2016)
- Oblivion (Pushkin Press, 2016)
- Life Stealer (Pushkin Press, 2016)
- Bloodling (Pushkin Press, 2016)
