= The Rain (TV series) =

Danish post-apocalyptic television series

- Genre: Drama; Post-apocalyptic; Psychological thriller; Science fiction
- Created by: Jannik Tai Mosholt; Esben Toft Jacobsen; Christian Potalivo
- Written by: Jannik Tai Mosholt; Lasse Kyed Rasmussen; Marie Østerbye; Poul Berg; Mette Heeno
- Directed by: Kenneth Kainz; Natasha Arthy
- Starring: Alba August; Lucas Lynggaard Tønnesen; Mikkel Boe Følsgaard; Lukas Løkken; Jessica Dinnage; Sonny Lindberg; Angela Bundalovic; Natalie Madueño; Clara Rosager; Evin Ahmad; Johannes Bah Kuhnke; Rex Leonard
- Composer: Av Av Av
- Country of origin: Denmark
- Original languages: Danish, Swedish
- No. of seasons: 3
- No. of episodes: 20

Production
- Executive producers: Peter Bose; Jonas Allen
- Producer: Christian Potalivo
- Production locations: Denmark, Sweden
- Cinematography: Jesper Tøffner; Rasmus Heise
- Editors: My Thordal; Marlene Billie Andreasen; Morten Egholm; Benjamin Binderup; Esben Bay Grundsøe
- Running time: 35–48 minutes
- Production company: Miso Film

Original release
- Network: Netflix
- Release: 4 May 2018 – 6 August 2020

The Rain is a Danish post-apocalyptic television series created by Jannik Tai Mosholt, Esben Toft Jacobsen and Christian Potalivo. It premiered on Netflix on 4 May 2018. The show stars Alba August, Lucas Lynggaard Tønnesen, Mikkel Boe Følsgaard, Lukas Løkken, Jessica Dinnage, Sonny Lindberg, and Angela Bundalovic, with Lars Simonsen, Bertil De Lorenhmad, Evin Ahmad, and Johannes Bah Kuhnke in recurring roles. The latter two become main characters in the second season.

On 30 May 2018, Netflix renewed The Rain for a second season, which was released on 17 May 2019, with 6 episodes. In June 2019, it was confirmed that the series was renewed for a third and final season, which was released on 6 August 2020.

== Premise ==
When a virus that is carried by rainfall wipes out almost all humans in Scandinavia, Danish siblings Simone and Rasmus take shelter in a bunker. Six years later, they emerge to search for their father, a scientist who left them in the bunker but never returned. Along the way, they join a group of young survivors and together they travel across Denmark and Sweden, searching for a safe place, and for the siblings' father, who may be able to provide answers and a cure.

== Cast and characters ==
=== Main ===
- Alba August as Simone Andersen
- Lucas Lynggaard Tønnesen as Rasmus Andersen
- Mikkel Boe Følsgaard as Martin
- Lukas Løkken as Patrick
- Jessica Dinnage as Lea (seasons 1–2)
- Sonny Lindberg as Jean
- Angela Bundalovic as Beatrice (season 1)
- Natalie Madueño as Fie (season 2–3)
- Clara Rosager as Sarah (season 2–3)
- Evin Ahmad as Kira (season 2–3)
- Johannes Bah Kuhnke as Sten (recurring, season 1; main, season 2–3)
- Rex Leonard as Daniel (season 3)

=== Recurring ===
- Lars Simonsen as Dr. Frederik Andersen, Simone and Rasmus' father (seasons 1–2)
- Jacob Luhmann as Thomas, Apollon "stranger" (seasons 1–2)
- Iben Hjejle as Ellen Andersen, Simone and Rasmus' mother (season 1)
- Bertil De Lorenzi as Young Rasmus (seasons 1–2)
- Anders Juul as Jakob, Sarah's older brother (season 2)
- Cecilia Loffredo as Luna (season 3)

== Episodes ==
=== Series overview ===
Series	Episodes	Originally released
1	8	4 May 2018
2	6	17 May 2019
3	6	6 August 2020

=== Season 1 (2018) ===
No. overall	No. in season	Title	Directed by	Written by	Original release date
1	1	"Stay Inside"	Kenneth Kainz	Jannik Tai Mosholt	4 May 2018
A deadly virus spread by rainfall forces siblings Simone and Rasmus and their parents to seek refuge in a well-equipped underground bunker. Their father, Dr. Frederik Andersen, is a scientist who works for Apollon, the company that crafted the bunkers. He instructs Simone to protect Rasmus, explaining that he is the key to curing the virus. He then leaves the bunker, saying he will return. Shortly after, Simone hears banging on the outer door, and she opens it, incorrectly assuming her father has returned. Her mother, knowing that it is not Frederick and that their family will be infected if anyone else comes in, runs outside the bunker and tackles a stranger before he can enter. She is exposed to the virus and quickly dies, leaving Simone and Rasmus alone. They are able to contact someone by radio, but the communication eventually stops. Simone has flashbacks to her parents' arguing about treating a sick Rasmus with some sort of virus. Six years pass. With their food supply dwindling, Rasmus wants to leave. Simone agrees, but first goes out alone in a contagion suit while Rasmus sleeps and finds only collapsed, desolate ruins. Later, back at the bunker, the air control alarms go off, signaling that oxygen is depleted. When Rasmus and Simone open the hatch to escape, they are confronted at gunpoint by other survivors who had covered the vents to force the siblings out. Flashback: Simone & Rasmus
2	2	"Stay Together"	Kenneth Kainz	Jannik Tai Mosholt	4 May 2018
Simone shows the group's leader, Martin, a map of other bunkers and promises them food. She then destroys the map, telling them they need to keep her alive to find it. In a flashback, Martin is revealed to have been a soldier tasked with holding the quarantine line at the onset of the virus. Unable to shoot a woman who is walking the highway holding an infant, Martin allows her to pass the checkpoint. He later finds his patrol dead, infected by the woman. In the present, the group encounters two men, referred to as "strangers", who are hunting survivors. Martin and Patrick (another member of Martin's group) kill the men. As the group travels, they struggle between doing what is needed to survive and holding on to their humanity. Finally, they arrive at a second bunker. Simone finds her father's phone in the bunker and learns, via information she finds on the device, that her father has likely traveled to Apollon headquarters in Sweden. Simone tells Martin that she and Rasmus are going to find their father. Flashback: Martin
3	3	"Avoid the City"	Kenneth Kainz	Jannik Tai Mosholt	4 May 2018
Simone and Rasmus venture into the city of Copenhagen as they travel toward Sweden. They are soon joined by Beatrice, Lea, and Jean, three members of Martin's group. Lea believes that Simone's search represents hope and calls Simone "their guiding star". Emotionally connected to Beatrice, Martin later follows along with a frustrated Patrick. Separated, each finds shelter during a rain storm. Simone helps a small child, only to later see him attacked and killed by a desperate group of starving scavengers. Beatrice and Rasmus take shelter in an expensive house, with Beatrice claiming that it is the house she was born in. Martin and Patrick take shelter inside a bus. Playing with a piece of tech he took off the dead "strangers", the device activates, revealing itself to be a map. Martin's group meets up after the storm, but a scavenger follows them and takes Rasmus hostage. The scavenger threatens to slit Rasmus' throat if the group does not give up their food supply to him. Martin and Patrick arrive and the scavenger stabs Rasmus before escaping with a bag of food supplies. The group arrives at a third bunker, only to find it stripped bare. In a flashback, Beatrice tells Martin a story about her family house, similar to the one she told Rasmus, revealing that she is not being truthful. In the present, Martin shows Simone the map and they determine it is of the quarantine zone. As the map shows a wall to the north, Martin concludes the spread of the virus was stopped. The wall, he declares, is where they need to go. Flashback: Beatrice
4	4	"Trust No One"	Kenneth Kainz	Poul Berg	4 May 2018
Rasmus, suffering from the stab wound he sustained earlier, is unable to walk, so Simone plans with the group to steal a car from one of the quarantine patrols run by the "strangers". The group manages to successfully intercept a quarantine patrol and incapacitate a group of "strangers". As Martin interrogates the captured "strangers" for information, Jean spots a snake tattoo on one of the men and recalls a memory that haunts him. He urges Martin to kill the men, and Patrick agrees. Martin seemingly does so, upsetting Simone. In a flashback, Jean stays with a kind family in the early days of the virus. One day, a quarantine patrol arrives and a group of "strangers" confronts the father of the family, instructing him to come with them. When the father refuses, he is killed by a man with a snake tattoo, and the mother is taken away. Trying to quiet the shocked daughter to protect them from discovery by the "strangers", Jean accidentally smothers her to death. After the "strangers" leave, Jean buries the family and is introduced to Beatrice and Lea, who had come upon him as he stood before the graves he had just dug. In the present, the group has moved north and meets a doctor who operates on Rasmus' stab wound. After Simone reveals who their father is, the doctor tells them she also used to work for Apollon. The doctor lures Simone and Rasmus away from the rest of the group and to her own bunker, confessing that she blames Dr. Andersen, the siblings' father, for the death of her children. The doctor attempts to inject Rasmus with a fatal poison. The "strangers" arrive and, seeing the man with the snake tattoo, Jean shoots him in the head and is then captured by the rest of the "strangers". The others flee to the bunker. Patrick goes in alone and shoots the doctor, declaring that this is how things will be done from now on. Later, Patrick asks Martin why he listens to Simone and not him. Martin tells Patrick that the latter made the choice not to help Jean, and so is partially responsible for his fate. Patrick breaks down in tears. The group takes shelter as the rain falls during the night. Flashback: Jean
5	5	"Have Faith"	Natasha Arthy, Kenneth Kainz	Mette Heeno	4 May 2018
Lost in the woods, the survivors stumble upon a mansion where residents invite them to stay the night. Martin is distrustful of the residents, who appear very cult-like. The others enjoy the accommodations, including showers, fresh food, and clean clothes. They are asked to forget their past and live in the now. In a flashback, Lea, a devout Christian, goes to a teen party against her mother's wishes. As a prank, her school peers spike her drink, and Lea's drunken behavior is caught on video and shared. Her mother sees the video, which has gone viral, and disowns Lea. Inside the house of the party, Lea prays for God to save her, and moments later, the rain begins. Her partying peers die from the virus (having all gathered outside except for Lea). However, Lea's mother also dies from the virus, having stepped outside during the rain in an attempt to pick Lea up. In the present, Lea bonds with an older woman, Karen, who teaches her to let go of the guilt she carries. Simone discovers that an Apollon employee is a resident of the mansion and seeks information from him. That night, all residents of the mansion are invited to a monthly "ceremony". It is revealed that every month, a member is randomly chosen to be killed and eaten for the next month's ceremony, allowing them to be one with the group. Lea is "chosen", but Karen takes her place and the survivors are allowed to leave. As he will not let go of the past, the Apollon employee is forced out of the mansion against his will. When he catches up with the survivors, he tells them Apollon is responsible for ending the world, before injecting himself with the virus and dying. Simone collects the syringe and the group walks into the night. Flashback: Lea
6	6	"Keep Your Friends Close"	Natasha Arthy, Kenneth Kainz	Jannik Tai Mosholt	4 May 2018
As the group squats in a cabin, Patrick is hurt when Martin states the two are not friends during a casual conversation. Needing supplies, the group prepares to go to the next bunker, but Rasmus says he is too sick to move. Simone, Martin, Patrick, and Lea go, planning to return with supplies. It turns out that Rasmus faked his illness to spend more time with Beatrice. It rains and the four are stuck in the bunker. They find videos of Apollon testing vaccines on random individuals. Depressed and alone, Patrick gets drunk. In a flashback to before the rain, Patrick is a loser who cannot hold a job or a girlfriend and his father disowns him. He is getting high in his car when the rain comes, sparing his life. In the present, a drunk Patrick tries to kiss Simone. When she rejects him they tussle and Patrick pushes her into the rain. Patrick tells Martin to shoot her, assuming she is infected. Martin hesitates, and Lea stands between the gun and Simone. Lea then backs up into the rain with Simone. When neither has a reaction, the group realizes the rain no longer causes infection. Back at the cabin, Beatrice and Rasmus enjoy their intimate day together, but a leaky roof causes Beatrice to be hit with a drop of water. Rasmus kisses her, assuming she is now infected, and they resign themselves to dying together. In the bunker, Martin tells Patrick he needs to leave and not come back, because he had pushed Simone into the rain. In a flashback, Patrick meets Martin for the first time, Martin telling him he is lucky they met when Patrick gives him a lighter. Patrick says it is the first time anyone has said that. In the present, Patrick returns to Rasmus and Beatrice, only to find Rasmus in a state of panic carrying Beatrice's corpse—she had come into contact with a stray, infected dog seen earlier near the cabin. Patrick panics and runs away, only to trip and be captured by the "strangers". Flashback: Patrick
7	7	"Don't Talk to Strangers"	Natasha Arthy, Kenneth Kainz	Poul Berg	4 May 2018
A band of armed "strangers" tortures Patrick in order to extract information from him. Patrick discloses to the "strangers" the location of the bunker, where Simone, Lea and Martin are, and about Rasmus not having been infected by Beatrice. Meanwhile, Rasmus arrives at the bunker, carrying Beatrice's corpse. In the bunker's quarantine room, Rasmus begins to unravel, refusing to leave Beatrice's side. Eventually he does, but he contacts the "strangers" and allows himself to be captured. In a flashback, Sten, the head of Apollon, briefs the mission to the "strangers", and then reveals to them that they have ingested nanocapsules of the virus which will be triggered if they leave the zone. Like the survivors, the "strangers" are trapped. In the present, the leader of the "strangers", Thomas, feels that Rasmus is the one they are looking for. After burying Beatrice, Simone, Martin, and Lea capture a "stranger". They try to trade him for Rasmus, but a depressed Rasmus takes the syringe with the virus and injects himself. However, he does not die. Martin makes up with Patrick, setting him free. Everyone leaves for Apollon headquarters, hoping Rasmus is the cure. As they leave, a "stranger" kisses Rasmus on the forehead for good luck. The former dies of the virus soon after the rest of the group is gone. Flashback: Thomas
8	8	"Trust Your Instincts"	Natasha Arthy, Kenneth Kainz	Jannik Tai Mosholt	4 May 2018
Arriving at Apollon headquarters, the group is separated. Rasmus and Simone meet their father while Martin, Patrick, and Lea wait in a bunker. There, they are reunited with Jean, much to Lea's joy. Simone's father, Dr. Andersen, tells her that they need to get away. To get the antidote, he tells her they will need to access Rasmus' brain and bone marrow, killing him. In a flashback, Dr. Andersen lies to Apollon, claiming his children are dead in order to save them. Dr. Andersen has been exposing people to the virus in an attempt to find someone to replace Rasmus, and brutally killed a colleague who found out the lie. In the present, a doctor taking a swab from Rasmus is infected and dies. Dr. Andersen realizes the virus has mutated and that Rasmus is now a carrier, needing to be stopped to save the world. As the lab goes on lockdown, Lea, Jean, Martin, and Patrick are reunited with Simone and Rasmus, and they plan to flee. However, Dr. Andersen shoots Martin in an attempt to stop the group from leaving with Rasmus. Patrick arrives with a stolen vehicle and the group reaches the wall. The "strangers" block their path, and Thomas tells them that the nutritional supplements Jean, Lea, Martin, and Patrick were given contain the virus nanocapsules. The four cannot leave, except Simone with Rasmus. The group encourages her to go. However, Simone cannot bear leaving her friends behind so the group backs away from the wall and drives off. Thomas tells Simone that he will be after her. In a final scene, Sten is making a sales pitch to a select group of investors, telling them the virus can be controlled and weaponized. Flashback: Dr. Anderson

=== Season 2 (2019) ===
No. overall	No. in season	Title	Directed by	Written by	Original release date
9	1	"Avoid Contact"	Søren Balle	Jannik Tai Mosholt	17 May 2019
On the run from Apollon soldiers, the group is eventually captured and reunited with Simone's and Rasmus' father, who is shot and killed while giving them directions to a place that can help save Rasmus and find a cure. They escape after Rasmus, in his distress over the death of his father, somehow infects the soldiers near him, causing a distraction. The group follows a set of coordinates to a base where rebel scientists who defected from Apollon are working on a vaccine for the virus. Fie and Jakob help them get into the community. Jakob runs tests on Rasmus, including a risky spinal tap that reveals there is no fluid or blood but only virus in his body. Rasmus, distressed by the pain and the doctor's discovery, accidentally releases the virus, killing Jakob and everyone else in the lab.
10	2	"The Truth Hurts"	Søren Balle	Rune Schjøtt	17 May 2019
Following the lab disaster, Simone arrives and convinces Rasmus to lie and say someone dropped a sample, infecting them all. Unbeknownst to them, Jakob's sickly younger sister Sarah witnessed her brother's death and their coverup from outside the lab. Martin accompanies Simone on a journey to retrieve her father's computer. At the base, Patrick stumbles upon a hidden room filled with strange devices. Flashback: Sarah
11	3	"Stay in Control"	Kasper Gaardsøe	Julie Budtz Sørensen	17 May 2019
As Apollon surrounds the base, Simone scrambles to find a cure. Rasmus's secret draws Sarah to him—but threatens to tear the group apart. Flashback: Fie
12	4	"Save Yourself"	Kasper Gaardsøe	Rune Schjøtt, Simon Oded Weil	17 May 2019
Simone, Martin, and Fie pursue Rasmus and Sarah, whose bond deepens while they are on the run. Sarah and Rasmus want to have one good day together. They go to an old amusement park. Sarah threatens to kill herself by jumping off the roller coaster but is talked down by Rasmus. Patrick makes a discovery. There is an Apollon facility that can remove the capsules that keep them trapped inside the zone with the virus. Jean tries to console Lea.
13	5	"Keep It Together"	Josefine Kirkeskov	Julie Budtz Sørensen	17 May 2019
Plagued by frightening visions, Rasmus takes his fate into his own hands. He knows the virus is taking over but the cure is not ready yet. He still injects himself with some of the solution. Sarah's health worsens. Jean and Lea share a tender moment. Simone and Fie may have discovered the cure. Lea sacrifices herself so that Simone can inject Rasmus with the cure.
14	6	"Survival of the Fittest"	Josefine Kirkeskov	Simon Oded Weil	17 May 2019
In the wake of their grim encounter, Martin and Patrick race back to the base. Meanwhile, a grief-stricken Jean plots revenge.

=== Season 3 (2020) ===
No. overall	No. in season	Title	Directed by	Written by	Original release date
15	1	"Don't Give Up"	Josefine Kirkeskov	Julie Budtz Sørensen	6 August 2020
Haunted by nightmares and afraid of his newfound powers, Rasmus voluntarily confines himself at Apollon. Meanwhile, Simone and Fie attempt to venture beyond the wall so that Fie can give birth to her child in a safe place. However, they are separated and Fie is captured. Simone escapes to the other side of the wall only to discover the virus is not contained, so she returns and is also captured and they are transported to the last Apollon base. Rasmus and Simone are happily reunited, but things quickly turn sour when Simone discovers Rasmus intends to infect her and everyone else so that they can survive the virus as he did, in order to create a new world. Patrick, Martin, and Kira break into the camp to rescue Fie and Simone. Fie refuses to leave due to her impending labor, but saves Patrick from imprisonment by claiming he is the baby's father. Simone manages to exit the compound but is cornered by Rasmus and Apollon staff, so she throws herself over a bridge into a river to avoid joining Rasmus. A distraught Martin witnesses this and is captured by Apollon staff. Sarah and Rasmus reunite.
16	2	"Never Let Go"	Josefine Kirkeskov	Anna Bro	6 August 2020
Simone is rescued by siblings Daniel and Luna who, with their parents, are living off the grid. Back at Apollon, Rasmus convinces Sarah to be studied by Sten so that they can spread the virus and create a new human race. Martin escapes imprisonment and frees Fie and Patrick, but they refuse to leave due to Fie's impending labor and their belief that Simone is dead. Fie and Sarah reunite but Sarah is resentful of Fie leaving her for dead, while Martin is recaptured. Daniel and Luna's father wants Simone gone as soon as she recovers as he fears her discovering the flower extract. Luna, however, demonstrates to Simone the power of the flower extract to repel the virus and she eventually follows the father to the source. Rasmus attempts to convince Martin that Simone is dead by showing him the tracker and asking him to join him; while Martin initially refuses, when alone, he apologizes to Simone for not being able to run anymore. Fie rejoins Apollon as a biologist after discovering Apollon was right as Sarah is living proof; she discovers a person's immune system must be completely compromised to absorb the virus. Sarah and Rasmus discover many of the terminally ill patients intended to receive the virus are already dead as Sten has started testing. Simone is nearly executed by Daniel's father to protect their secret; however, Daniel attacks his father and allows her to escape. Martin agrees to join Rasmus and receive the virus. Flashback: Daniel
17	3	"Stay Strong"	Kaspar Munk	Lasse Kyed Rasmussen	6 August 2020
Daniel's father pursues Simone on foot, while Daniel runs into Kira and Jean and recruits their help to save Simone from his father. After Kira disarms Daniel's father, Simone refuses to leave until Daniel gives her the flower extract and demonstrates its power to Jean and Kira, not knowing they are being watched. Sten wants to test Fie's theory on a terminally ill cancer patient named Olivia and then be the first to receive the virus once it has proven successful, while Rasmus wants the first to be Martin as he trusts him. Sten threatens Rasmus with Sarah's death by fire to ensure his cooperation with the test, which turns out to be a success, but has adverse effects on Rasmus. Daniel agrees to show Simone the dangerous extraction process but in the process disturbs the flower, which shoots out shrapnel that almost kills Daniel, Kira, and Simone. Back at the RV, Jean and Daniel's family are attacked by unknown assailants and Daniel's father is injured by an arrow. Kira pursues the assailants and shoots one but is horrified to discover their attackers are children. Rasmus frees Patrick and Martin to find Sarah and agrees to pass the virus to Sten first, but instead kills him by infecting him before his immune system is fully compromised. Daniel restores the tracker for Simone, alerting Fie and Patrick to her being alive. Patrick runs to stop Martin from taking the virus, but is too late. Luna goes missing while Kira and Simone are patrolling the perimeter.
18	4	"Be the Change You Want in the World"	Kaspar Munk	Christoffer Barfred Krustrup	6 August 2020
Simone, Kira, Jean, and Daniel go after Luna, who has been kidnapped by the young scavengers, intending to trade food for her return. However, the man leading the group tricks Simone into using the flower extract to escape the virus after being attacked and cornered by the young scavengers. He demands the flower extract in return for Luna. Martin discovers Simone's survival after Patrick attempts to keep it hidden, and Rasmus allows Martin to leave to pursue Simone since he has forcibly taken control of Apollon following Sten's death. Rasmus, who has developed a lesion on his neck, uses his powers to spy on Martin. Sarah is resentful of him attempting to bring Simone back but worries about the lesion. Simone brokers a deal with the leader of the young scavengers, but he double-crosses them and spikes their Coca-Cola in order to go after the flower. Rasmus infects more of the sick patients but weakens during the process, worrying Fie, who confides in Sarah. Rasmus overhears and becomes convinced that Fie should be the next infected since he believes he cannot trust her. Fie and Patrick make the decision to flee Rasmus and Apollon. Jean frees Simone, Kira, Daniel, and Luna, but they are too late as the flower's defenses killed almost all the young scavengers (except the one shot by Kira) and their leader. As a result, the flower is dead and only one vial of extract remains. Martin finds Simone in time to see Daniel and Simone kiss; Rasmus also sees this as he is telepathically spying on Martin. Flashback: Kira
19	5	"Love Yourself"	Kasper Gaardsøe	Lasse Kyed Rasmussen	6 August 2020
Simone and Martin reunite. Martin tells Simone that Rasmus has changed and that Sten is dead, but Simone still believes he is dangerous and intends to use the last vial of extract on Rasmus. As Rasmus grows weaker and develops more lesions, a worried Sarah asks Fie for help before she and Patrick can flee Apollon. Martin and Simone leave the camp to make the trek to Apollon, while Kira and Jean remain behind. Fie discovers that Rasmus is killing himself and changing the virus by infecting others, and refuses to leave Apollon without Sarah. Sarah forces Rasmus to stop infecting others as his condition deteriorates, but he decides to infect a pregnant Fie anyway as she betrayed his condition to Sarah; he locks Sarah away to prevent her from stopping him. On the walk to Apollon, Martin does not tire due to the virus inside him and Simone eventually forces him to stop so she can rest. She professes her love for him and claims she will never leave him no matter what, but her attitude quickly changes when she discovers he has been infected. Martin tries to convince Simone to join them, but she tells him to drink the vial or never see her again. Martin, not in control, enshrouds Simone in the virus, forcing her to drop the vial, but ultimately saves her by drinking the last drops from the vial, which kills the virus in him and him within it. Rasmus sees Martin's death and goes into a rage, while Simone is distraught over his death. Rasmus convinces Sarah and the rest of the infected to go after Simone and kill her. Patrick helps Fie escape.
20	6	"And This Too Shall Pass"	Kasper Gaardsøe	Julie Budtz Sørensen	6 August 2020
A distraught Simone and Daniel return to camp with Martin's body. Kira encourages Simone to be there for Martin's burial. The virus left behind by Martin in the pool brings the flower back to life and they discover Martin actually saved them as the flower feeds off the virus. Fie and Patrick are reunited with the group but Patrick is devastated to learn Martin is dead. Simone intends to kill Rasmus with the new flower extract and Patrick reveals that he is already on his way to the camp to kill her. Daniel's family agrees to stay to help fight Rasmus and gives Simone Luna's necklace, which contains the extract, as the new flower is not yet ready to be harvested. They create a trap for Rasmus to separate him from the group and use the extract to create a single bullet capable of killing the infected. Fie goes into labor and demands Patrick stay alive as she cannot go through it alone. Rasmus continues to deteriorate but refuses to return with Sarah when she doesn't want to murder Simone and the others. Sarah saves Patrick and Daniel's father from being executed by Apollon and reunites with Fie, who convinces Sarah to attempt to stop Rasmus. The trap fails when they kill only one of the infected and not Rasmus. Olivia pursues Daniel, Kira, and Jean, while Rasmus remains alone with Simone. The young scavenger shoots Olivia with a flaming arrow, allowing them to escape, and she along with the rest of the infected refuse to fight anymore. Sarah rejoins Rasmus and they inject the flower with their combination of the virus, causing a massive shockwave that immediately kills them and all the infected and destroys the flower, which rids the world of the virus. Fie gives birth to a baby boy. The group leaves the camp and returns to the city to rebuild a new world for Rasmus.

== Production ==
Production on Season 1 commenced in late June 2017 in Denmark and Sweden.

Netflix announced on 30 May 2018 that the series would go into production for a second season at the end of 2018. The second season premiered on Netflix on 17 May 2019.

Season 3 of The Rain premiered on Netflix on 6 August 2020.
