= Natalie Madueño =

Danish actress (born 1987)

- Born: Natalie Wolfsberg Madueño; 7 November 1987 (age 38); Copenhagen, Denmark
- Occupation: Actress
- Known for: The Rain

Natalie Wolfsberg Madueño (born 7 November 1987) is a Danish actress best known to international audiences for starring in the 2019 Netflix series The Rain and in four seasons of Those Who Kill.

== Early life and education ==
Madueño was born to a Spanish father and a Danish mother. She grew up in the Vesterbro district of Copenhagen and trained as an actress at the Danish National School of Performing Arts.

== Career ==
Madueño had a leading role in the first two seasons of Follow the Money, which dealt with big business, crime, and corruption. In an interview, she described her character, Claudia, as a cutthroat person, saying, "I think the duality in her character attracted me to her". Her roles have turned her into one of Denmark's best-known younger actresses.

In 2019, Madueño was cast in one of the lead roles of the Scandinavian-noir series Darkness: Those Who Kill. In 2026, she was cast in the Netflix series The Secret Woman.

== Selected filmography ==
=== Film ===
List of film appearances, with year, title, and role shown
Year	Title	Role	Notes
2006	Life Hits	Josephine	credited as Natalie Manduno
2014	Lev stærkt	Lisa	
2015	Itsi Bitsi	Young girl 2	
2016	Satisfaction 1720	Leonora Ployart	
2016	Swinger	Patricia	
2018	Wonderful Copenhagen	Aggi	
2018	I krig & kærlighed	Marie	

=== Television ===
List of television appearances, with year, title, and role shown
Year	Title	Role	Notes
2016	Follow the Money	Claudia Moreno	20 episodes
2018	Warrior	Søs	3 episodes
2019	The Rain	Fie	12 episodes
2019–2024	Those Who Kill	Louise Bergstein	32 episodes
