= Elsebeth Egholm =

Danish journalist and author

Elsebeth Egholm (born 17 September 1960) is a Danish journalist and best-selling author who writes mainly crime fiction novels. She is known internationally as the creator of the television series Those Who Kill.

== Early life ==
Born in Nyborg on the Danish island of Funen, she grew up in Lisbjerg near Aarhus, where her parents had a garden centre. After schooling in Aarhus, she matriculated from the state gymnasium in Hasle. She went on to study piano at the Music Conservatory of Jutland, where she remained for four years before switching to journalism at the Danish School of Journalism (Journalisthøjskolen) in 1985.

== Career ==
After an apprenticeship with Berlingske Tidende in Copenhagen, she worked as a background reporter for the newspaper until 1992, when she quit and moved to Malta. There she worked both as a freelance journalist and as a short story writer for women's magazines such as Alt for Damerne. On the Maltese island of Gozo, she met her future husband, British thriller author Philip Nicholson, with whom she lived until his death in 2005. Her first major success was De frie kvinders klub (The Free Women's Club) in 1999, followed by Scirocco and Mig og min ø (Me and My Island) in 2000 and Opium in 2001, addressing the problems of marriage in a background of international intrigue.

Her series featuring the journalist Dicte Svendsen began in 2002 with Skjulte Fejl og Mangler (Hidden Errors), continuing with Selvrisiko (Own Risk), Personskade (Personal Damage), Nærmeste Pårørende (Next of Kin), Liv og Legeme (2008), and Vold og magt (2009). By this time, her novels were also being published in Germany, Holland, Sweden and Norway. Translations into English include Life and Limb (2012) Next of Kin, Three Dog Night (2013) and Dead Souls (2014).

In 2018 Egholm was awarded the Harald Mogensen Prize by the Danish Criminal Academy (Det danske Kriminalakademi, DKA) for her novel I always find you.

== Television ==
The 10-episode television series Those Who Kill (2012), first broadcast in Denmark as Dem som dræber (2011), tells how police detective Katrina Ries Jensen investigates several gruesome murders with strange psychological overtones.

Dicte, a series based on several of Egholm's books, was first broadcast in Denmark in 2013. It is centred in Aarhus, Egholm's home town.
