= Christian Dorph =

Danish author

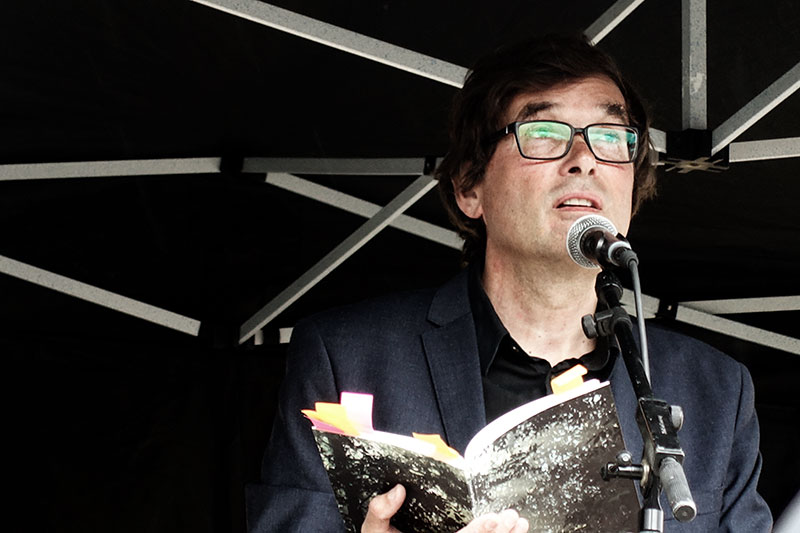
Image of Christian Dorph

Christian Dorph (born August 27, 1966 in Odense, Denmark) is a Danish author. He has written several collections of poems as well as crime fiction.

In 1988, Christian Dorph was admitted at the Forfatterskolen (a 2-year artistic education) in Copenhagen. He studied Danish literature at Aarhus University, and today he teaches creative writing classes at Testrup Højskole.

Along with his author colleague Simon Pasternak, Christian Dorph is writing a series of crime novels that all take place in the last fourth of the twentieth century and in which historical events and people play a crucial role.

== Published works ==
- Et stykke tid (1992). Poems
- Kontinuum (1995). Poems
- Øjet og øret (1999). Crime fiction
- Popcorn (2000). Poems
- Hylster (2003). Crime fiction
- Om et øjeblik i himlen (In a Moment in Heaven) (2005). Crime fiction, written by Christian Dorph and Simon Pasternak
- Afgrundens rand (Edge of the Abyss) (2007). Crime fiction, written by Christian Dorph and Simon Pasternak
- Jeg er ikke her (I'm Not Here) (2010). Crime fiction, written by Christian Dorph & Simon Pasternak
