= Agnete Friis (writer) =

Danish author (born 1974)

Agnete Friis (born 1974) is a Danish writer who is best known for co-authoring Drengen i kufferten, or The Boy in the Suitcase with Lene Kaaberbøl. The book was short-listed for the Scandinavian Glass Key Award, competing against The Girl with the Dragon Tattoo and received the 2008 Harald Mogensen award for best crime novel.

It has been translated into ten languages and there are more than two million copies in print. It was translated into English in 2011. The book was reviewed by Sarah Weinman as "among one of the best crime novels of the year".

Agnete Friis also works as a journalist, and has also published children and adolescent literature.

== Published works ==
=== The Nina Borg series (written with Lene Kaaberbøl) ===
1. Drengen i kufferten / The Boy in the Suitcase (2008) ISBN 978-1-56947-981-0
2. Et stille umærkeligt drab / Invisible Murder (2010) ISBN 978-1-61695-170-2
3. Nattergalens død / Death of a Nightingale (2011) ISBN 978-1-61695-304-1
4. Den betænksomme morder / The Considerate Killer (2013) ISBN 978-1-61695-528-1

=== Standalone novels ===
- Blitz / What My Body Remembers (2017) ISBN 978-1-61695-602-8
- Summer of Ellen
- Justas' Børn (2025), ISBN 978-87-7593-688-5
