= Lærke Winther Andersen =

Danish actress (born 1975)

Lærke Winther Andersen (born 23 September 1975) is a Danish actress, best known for her role in Shake It All About (2001) and her recurring role in Those Who Kill.
