= Claes Bang =

Danish actor and musician (born 1967)

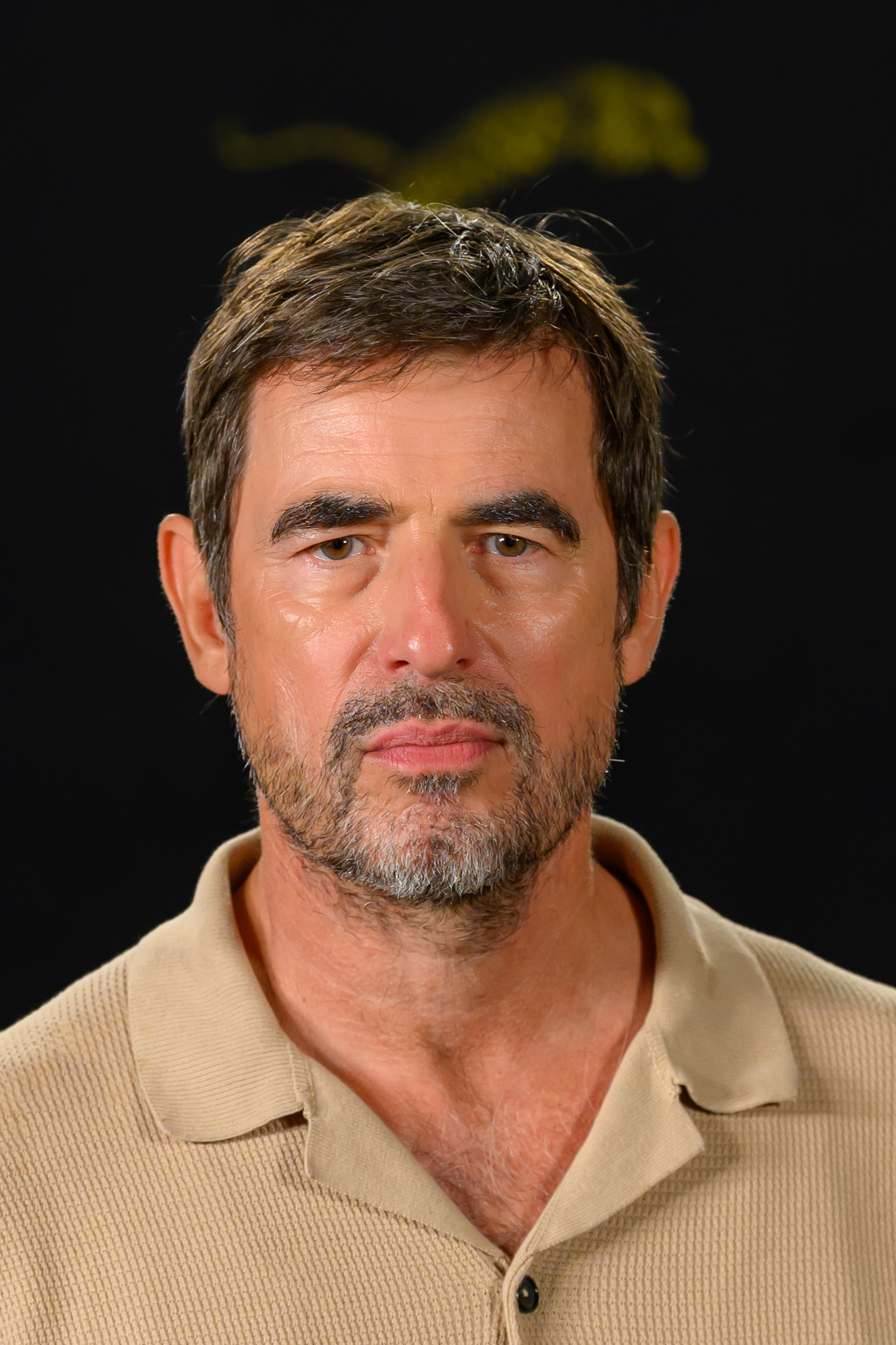
- Bang in 2026
- Born: Claes Kasper Bang; 28 April 1967 (age 59); Odense, Denmark
- Education: Danish National School of Theatre
- Occupation: Actor
- Years active: 1996–present
- Spouse: Lis Louis-Jensen (m. 2010)
- Musical career
- Also known as: This Is Not America
- Genres: Electronica, synth-pop
- Instruments: Vocals, piano, guitar
- Years active: 2008–present
- Labels: Music for Dreams, Sound Seduction

Claes Kasper Bang (Danish: [ˈkʰlɛˀs ˈpɑŋˀ]; born 28 April 1967) is a Danish actor and musician. He is best known for playing the leading role of Christian in Ruben Östlund's 2017 film The Square, which won the Palme d'Or at the Cannes Film Festival, and for the role of Fjölnir in Robert Eggers's 2022 film The Northman.

In 2019, he played the role of Sasha Mann for the final season of The Affair, and he rose to further international recognition by starring as Count Dracula in the BBC/Netflix series Dracula (2020). For his role in The Square, he became the first Dane to win the European Film Award for Best Actor.

Bang has also developed a music career under the moniker of This Is Not America.

== Early life and education ==
Claes Kasper Bang was born in Odense on the Danish island of Funen. After his parents' divorce, he mostly lived with his father and moved home frequently, attending several schools while growing up.

During his third year of high school, Bang participated in the musical Hair, that began his interest in acting, and after he left school he continued to do amateur theatre. At the age of 23, he made an application to the Danish National School of Theatre after discovering that the age limit for applying is 25. He was unsuccessful but applied again the next year and was accepted five days before his 25th birthday. He attended the school in 1992 and graduated with a diploma in 1996.

== Acting career ==
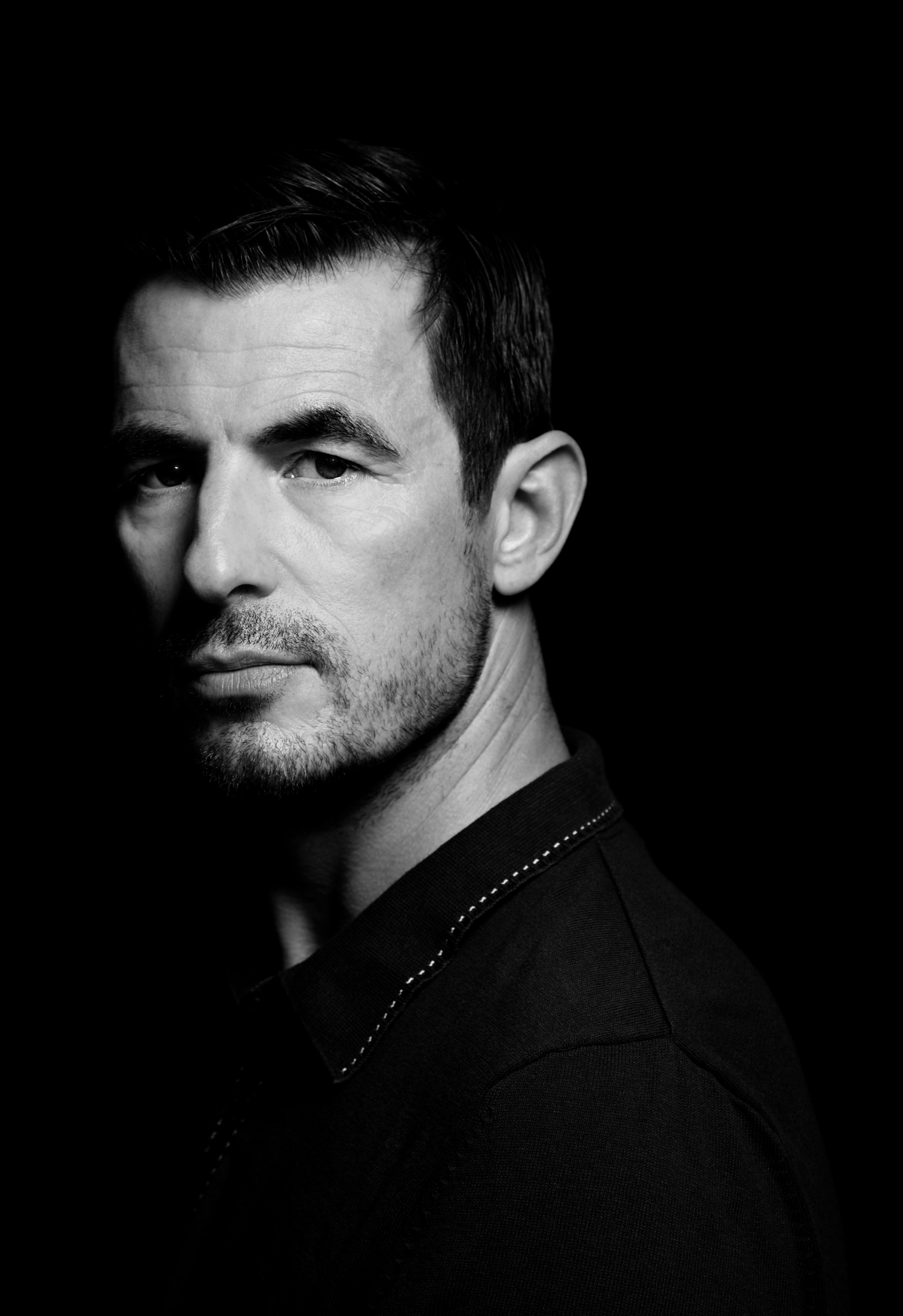
Bang in 2015

Bang's first theatre role after graduation was at Børneteatret Skægspire in the play Tudseakvariet, and he received his first breakthrough role in the Danish 1997 television show Taxa.

From 2001 to 2004, he was a permanent member of the cast at Aalborg Teater. In 2002, he asked the theatre director for permission to perform a monologue called Ondskaben, which is based on Jan Guillou's novel Evil. After leaving the theatre in 2004, Bang bought the rights to the work so he could perform the monologue at other theatres. He has performed the monologue almost 400 times, including an English language version in Denmark, Sweden, the UK, Germany, and South Africa.

Bang starred in numerous Danish television series and films early in his career. From 2006 to 2008, he gained wide recognition (particularly in Germany) for his role in the Danish police drama Anna Pihl. He subsequently starred in several German language roles both on television (Küstenwache, SOKO Wismar, Notruf Hafenkante, Sibel & Max, and Cologne P.D.) and in film (Jungle Child, Rettet Raffi!, Alle unter einer Tanne, and Überleben an der Scheidungsfront).

He played the leading role of the art museum curator Christian in Ruben Östlund's 2017 film The Square, which won the Palme d'Or at the 2017 Cannes Film Festival. He also won the European Film Award for Best Actor, becoming the first Dane to do so.

In November 2018, Bang was cast to play Count Dracula in the BBC mini-series Dracula, created by the film-makers involved in Sherlock. In an interview for The Guardian, it was observed that, while "sexy" and "insatiable", it is also "a very witty performance" from Bang.

On 14 April 2020, it was announced that Bang would be working on the pilot of Little Room (previously called The Agoraphobics Detective Society), which was produced by Maggie Montieth and directed/written by his Dracula co-star Dolly Wells, with Suzi Ewing and Heidi Greensmith. Bang and the other cast members filmed themselves from home on Zoom, and were responsible for the props, wardrobe, hair and makeup, and sound. The pilot was released online by Pinpoint Presents on 27 May 2020, and viewers were asked to donate to The Film and Television Charity and the Motion Picture & Television Fund, to help those in the film, TV and cinema industries who have been financially impacted by the COVID-19 pandemic.

In 2022, Bang starred in the Apple TV comedy drama series Bad Sisters as the cruel husband John Paul (JP), whose funeral the series revolves around. Bang later told about how he experienced being approached on the streets in New Zealand and Copenhagen from people asking if he was “the prick” from the show. In 2022 Bang also starred in the Robert Eggers drama, The Northman, opposite of Alexander Skarsgård. The shooting for the film took place in July of 2020 after being pushed from March 2020 due to the break out of COVID-19-pandemic. Bang later told about how he believed the production was perhaps only pushed through because a large amount of money had already been spent on creating sets and costumes prior to the outbreak of the pandemic. During the shooting period, Bang lived in isolation in his apartment in Belfast, and only went outside for shooting the film.

In 2024, Bang starred in the Apple TVs drama series The New Look where he portrayed nazi officer and Coco Chanels lover, Hans Günther von Dincklage. He appeared in six out of ten episodes in the series.

In 2024, Bang portrayed the Swiss mythical figure William Tell in Nick Hamm‘s movie with the same name. Bang later stated that he was happy to have been cast for the part and play the hero after having starred in Bad Sisters (2022) and The Northman (2022). For the film, Bang had to learn how to use and shoot a crossbow.

In 2025, Bang portrayed the Danish architect Johan Otto von Spreckelsen in the historic drama The Great Arch which was based on the creation of the Grande Arche in Paris in the 1980s. Bang had to learn French for the part, a skill which he was later praised for by his co-actor Sidse Babett Knudsen who herself is fluent in French. The movie received critical acclaim, and Bang received his first nomination for the César Awards Best Actor.

In 2026, Bang starred in Angel Manuel Soto’s action comedy The Wrecking Crew, where he as the leader of a yakuza-gang acted opposite Jason Momoa and Dave Batista.

=== Upcoming ===
In October of 2025, it was announced that Bang would portray Felix Kersten, known as the masseuse for the leader of the SS, Heinrich Himmler, in Felix Randau’s historical drama I Is Another. No announced premiere date was confirmed.

In December of 2025, reports stated that Bang would star in the American action movie Painter. Bang’s role and the premiere date was undisclosed.

== Music ==
This Is Not America is the name of Bang's musical side project. He describes it as "a sanctuary and a creative playground where there is no director making the decisions." Bang writes and composes the songs himself, and his musical style can be described as a mix of Gangway, Pet Shop Boys and Depeche Mode. Music videos and album art for This Is Not America are produced with help from his wife Lis Kasper Bang, née Louis-Jensen, who does the filming and photography.

Bang started composing music for fun with a recording studio on his computer in 2002. He records the piano and guitar pieces himself (he learnt these instruments when he was younger) and then programs them with other sounds on his computer. Bang chose the alias This Is Not America to circumvent DR's policy of not broadcasting tracks by actors, and to prevent his acting career from influencing how people perceive his music. The name comes from a song by David Bowie, who is one of Bang's great role models. His first three singles "Don't Come Crying", "Shameless", and "Run" were played on P3 for a year before the station found out that they were made by the actor, however his songs were still played on various DR radio stations for a few more years. These singles were later released on the debut album Dislocated on 7 April 2010.

Two of Bang's co-stars have featured on some This Is Not America tracks. In 2015, he released the single "Still of the Night", featuring Charlotte Munck, his co-star in the Danish police drama Anna Pihl. While filming The Square, Bang discovered that co-star and musician Marina Schiptjenko shared the same taste in music, so he showed her some of his music and sent her a few demos. Once filming finished, they recorded five songs together in his home studio in Copenhagen. So far, the duo has released "Who Am I", "I Don't Care" and "Here We Go".

== Personal life ==
Bang met stylist and photographer Lis Louis-Jensen in 2006 while they were both working on the play Den grønne elevator at Kanonhalløj. Louis-Jensen proposed to Bang on New Year's Eve 2007, and they got married on 25 September 2010 on a canal boat in Copenhagen. Bang is stepfather to Lis' two children. The pair have lived together in Frederiksberg, Copenhagen since 2008.

== Filmography ==
=== Film ===
Year	Title	Role	Notes
1998	On Our Own	Police officer	
1999	Fast Lane	Jesper	
2003	Regel nr. 1	John T	
2005	Nynne	Henrik	
2005	Far til fire gi'r aldrig op	Gym teacher	
2006	A Soap	Male 2	
2008	Take the Trash	Lars	
2011	Jungle Child	Herb	
2011	Biler 2	Professor Zündapp	Danish dub of Cars 2
2012	Lærkevej - til døden os skiller	Per	
2014	Unga Sophie Bell	Klaus	
2015	Rettet Raffi!	Henry Wiese	
2017	The Square	Christian	Bang dubbed himself in the German language version
2018	The Girl in the Spider's Web	Jan Holtser	
2019	The Glass Room	Viktor	
2019	The Burnt Orange Heresy	James Figueras	
2019	The Last Vermeer	Captain Joseph Piller	
2020	The Bay of Silence	Will Walsh	Also an executive producer
2021	Locked Down	Essien	
2022	The Northman	Fjölnir	
2022	Diorama	Ben	
2022	It Is In Us All	Jack Considine	
2024	Stockholm Bloodbath	King Christian II	
2024	The Master and Margarita	Pontius Pilate	
2024	Bonjour Tristesse	Raymond	
2024	William Tell	William Tell	
2025	Mother's Baby	Dr. Vilfort	In competition at the 75th Berlin International Film Festival
2025	The Great Arch	Johan Otto von Spreckelsen	
2025	Momo	Richter	
2026	The Wrecking Crew	Marcus Robichaux	
2026	Home	Jesper	
TBA	Billion Dollar Spy †	TBA	Post-production
TBA	Painter †	TBA	Post-production
TBA	I Is Another †	Felix Kersten	Post-production

=== Television ===
Year	Title	Role	Notes
1997	Station 7-9-13: Gufol mysteriet	Trench coat man 1	
1997	Taxa	Kriminalbetjent	Episode: "Del 8"
1998	Taxa	Betjent	Episode: "Del 29"
1998	Taxa	Betjenten	Episode: "Del 31"
1998–1999	Taxa	Christian, kriminalbetjent	2 episodes
2000	Madsen og Co.	Henrik	Episode: "Ud på ski"
2000	Skjulte spor	Preben	1 episode
2000	Pyrus i alletiders eventyr	Udyret	Episode: "På med pilen"
2001	At the Faber	Bjarne	4 episodes
2002	Rejseholdet	Villy	Episode: "Assistancemelding A-3/01"
2002	Nikolaj og Julie	Kevin	1 episode
2002	Langt fra Las Vegas i nærheden af Meyerheim	Dennis	Television film; uncredited
2003	Langt fra Las Vegas	Dennis Randrup	Episode: "Mere møs til Dennis"
2003	The Country Doctor	Jørn	Episode: "Wiedersehen in Dänemark"
2006–2008	Anna Pihl	Martin Krøyer	Main cast
2008	Max	Claes Bang, Skuespiller	Episode: "Magiske Mester Max"
2008–2009	2900 Happiness	Borgmester Hans Holm	Main cast
2010	Borgen	Tore Gudme	Episode: "Det muliges kunst"
2010	Küstenwache	Tomas Jorgensen	Episode: "Am Abgrund"
2012	SOKO Wismar	Urmas Savi	Episode: "Zuckerbrot"
2012	Notruf Hafenkante	Holger Lüder	Episode: "Unter Brüdern"
2013	Dicte	Arne Bay	Episode: "Liv og legeme - del 1"
2013	The Bridge	Claudio	3 episodes
2014	Alle unter eine Tanne	Micha	Television film
2015	Überleben an der Scheidungsfront	Lars Knudsen	Television film
2015–2016	Sibel & Max	Dr. Tobias Olsen	Main cast
2016	Cologne P.D.	Jens Jensen	2 episodes
2019	The Affair	Sasha Mann	7 episodes
2020	Dracula	Count Dracula	Main cast
2020	Syv kontinenter, en klode	Narrator	Danish dub of Seven Worlds, One Planet
2020	Little Room	Oskar Amundsen	Main cast
2021–2024	The Outlaws	Liam "The Dean" Matheson	10 episodes
2022	Bad Sisters	JP Williams	Main role
2024	The New Look	Hans von Dincklage	Main role
TBA	Assassin's Creed	TBA	Main role

=== Podcasts ===
Year	Title	Role	Notes
2016	Den Fjerde Væg	Himself	Episode 19
2017	Bucket List	Himself	Episode: "Claes Bang gør status på, hvor han er nu og taler om 'Vild Med Dans', angst og kontrol"
2017	Ungdoms Bureauet: De flygtede	Narrator	Episode: "Claes Bang at forandre verden gennem dans"
2017	Hva så?! med Christian Fuhlendorff	Himself	Episode 15
2018	The Curzon Film Podcast	Himself	Episode: "The Square, feat. Ruben Östlund & Claes Bang"
2018	RADIO GLAD - I rollen som skuespiller	Himself	
2020	Soundvenue Streamer	Himself	Episode: "Special guest Claes Bang taler Dracula, Bond-rygter og sms’er fra Mick Jagger"
2020	Uopklaret	Narrator	13 episodes; Danish version of the Unresolved podcast
2020	Til eftertiden (sammen hver for sig)	Himself	
2020	Mellem ørerne med Cecilie Frøkjær	Himself	Episode 31
2020	HFPA in Conversation	Himself	Episode: "Claes Bang on the Loneliness of Eternal Life"
2020	Dirty Diana	Oliver Wood	Main cast
2020	The Filmmakers Podcast	Himself	Episode: "Claes Bang: Acting & Making Films and TV -The Bay of Silence, The Square, Dracula and The Northmen"
2021	Red River Horror	Himself	Episode 33
2021	Filmland	Himself	Episode: "Hvad er det for noget med Claes Bang og kunsteksperter med råd i moralen?"
2021	Guttermand	Himself	Episode 24
2021	Nordic Portraits	Himself	Episode: "Claes Bang"
2021	Nordic Portraits	Himself	Episode: "Bonus Ep - Claes Bang Returns"

== Theatre credits ==
Year	Title	Role	Venue	Notes
1994	Faust	Various	Betty Nansen Teatret	
1996	Tudseakvariet	Faderen	Børneteatret Skægspire	
1997	En ren formalitet	Kommisæren	Statens Teater Skole	
1997	Freden	Various	Det Danske Teater	
1997	Pelleas & Melisande	Pelleas	Kaleidoskop	
1998	Kondylomer	Anders	Kaleidoskop	
1999	La Dispute	Mesrin	Husets Teater	
1999	Leg med Ild	Knud	Teater Styhr & Kjær	
1999	Leg med Ild	Knud	Aalborg Teater	
2000	Håndværkerne	Various	Husets Teater	
2001	Vennebogen	Georg	Aarhus Teater	
2001	Dansemus	Albert Halling	Aarhus Teater	
2001	Jean de France	Tjeneren	Aalborg Teater	
2001	Revisoren	Various	Aalborg Teater	
2002	Fruen fra Havet	Den Fremmede	Aalborg Teater	
2002	Ondskaben	Erik	Aalborg Teater	Monologue
2002	Kiss Me, Kate	Hank Calloway	Aalborg Teater	
2002	Ondskaben	Erik	Aalborg Teater	Monologue
2003	Købmanden fra Venedig	Lorenzo	Aalborg Teater	
2003	Boblerne i bækken	Morten	Aalborg Teater	
2003	Skylddrup, Skamdrup og Vamdrup	Hans-Erik, Skyldrup	Aalborg Teater	
2004	Jorden rundt på 80 dage	Various	Aalborg Teater	
2004	De lærde damer	Vadius	Aalborg Teater	
2004	Hamlet	Rosenkrantz	Hamletscenen, Kronborg	
2004	Ondskaben	Erik	Folketeatret	Monologue
2005	Gregersen Sagaen - Visse hensyn	Erik	Aarhus Teater	
2005	Nattur	Han	Husets Teater	
2006	Ondskaben	Erik	Aarhus Teater	Monologue
2006	Gregersen Sagaen - Faste forhold	Erik	Aarhus Teater	
2006	Den grønne elevator	Jakob	Kanonhalløj	
2007	Rene linjer	Erik	Aarhus Teater	
2007	Ondskaben	Erik	Kanonhalløj	Monologue
2007	Idioten	Rogozjin	Aarhus Teater	
2008	Familien Gregersen - Hele historien	Erik	Aarhus Teater	
2008	Privatliv	Victor	Grønnegårds	
2008	Glade Dage	Willie	Hamletscenen, Kronborg	
2009	Blekingegade	Holger Jensen	Husets Teater	
2009	Ondskaben	Erik	Docken	Monologue
2009	Ondskaben	Erik	Nørregade Teatret	Monologue
2010	Håndværkerne	Karl	Aalborg Teater	
2010	Saunaen	Bjoern	Får 302	
2010	Saunaen		Borupgaardteatret	
2010	Saunaen		Dansk Pistol Teater	
2010	Saunaen		Jomfru Ane Teatret	
2010	I morgen i Qatar	Wüntrop	Husets Teater	
2011	Hundesvømning	Johann	Folketeatret	
2012	Ondskaben	Erik	Folketeatret	Monologue
2012	Lykkebjørn	Nikolaj	Folketeatret	
2012	Squash	Christian	Får 302	
2013	Æblet	Ronni	Mammutteatret	
2014	Sne	Grøn	Husets Teater	
2014	Ondskaben	Erik	Folketeatret	Monologue
2014	The Evil	Erik	Riverside Studios	Monologue; English version of Ondskaben
2014	Min Arm		Team Teatret	Monologue; Danish version of My Arm
2014	L'histoire du soldat	The Devil/Narrator	Copenhagen Phil	
2015	Danske Permafrost		AKT1 Danmarks Lydteater	Live in the Dome of Visions, Copenhagen
2015	The Evil	Erik	St. James Theatre	Monologue; English version of Ondskaben
2015	Min Arm		Team Teatret	Monologue; Danish version of My Arm
2016	Sidst på dagen er vi alle mennesker		Betty Nansen Teatret	
2016	The Evil	Erik	Folketeatret	Monologue; English version of Ondskaben
2016	Ren (Medea)	Jason	Husets Teater	
2017	Ondskaben	Erik	Sønderborghus	Monologue
2017	Ondskaben	Erik	Folketeatret	Monologue
2017	Min Arm		Betty Nansen Teatret	Monologue; Danish version of My Arm
2017	The Evil	Erik	Edinburgh International Children's Festival	Monologue; English version of Ondskaben
2017	Byen	Chris	Odense Teater	Danish version of The City by Martin Crimp
2017	Jul i republikken	Prince Henrik	Aveny-T	Was intended to be broadcast on DR P1
2018	The Evil	Erik	Deutsches Theater (Berlin)	Monologue; English version of Ondskaben
2018	The Evil	Erik	Theatre Arts Admin Collective, South Africa	Monologue; English version of Ondskaben
2019	The Evil	Erik	Maxim Teatern	Monologue; English version of Ondskaben
2020	The Evil	Erik	Deutsches Theater	Monologue; English version of Ondskaben
2022	"Daddy" A Melodrama	Andre	Almeida Theatre	

== Discography ==
=== Albums ===
- 2010: Dislocated

=== EPs ===
- 2011: EP1
- 2014: Keep on Dancin
- 2015: Still of the Night
- 2020: Here We Go
- 2020: Butterflies in December
- 2020: You & I (Forever Live or Die)
- 2020: No Song Left Unsung
- 2020: Your Love Is Wasted on Me
- 2020: Take It on the Chin
- 2021: Late to the Party

=== Singles ===
Year	Title	Album/EP
2008	"Don't Come Crying"	Dislocated Featured on the soundtrack for Take the Trash
2009	"Shameless"	Dislocated
2009	"Run"	Dislocated
2011	"Virgin Mary"	EP1
2012	"Imaginary Friend"	Re-released on Butterflies in December in 2020
2012	"Jealousy"	—N/a
2014	"No One"	Keep on Dancin' Re-released on No Song Left Unsung in 2020
2014	"Care"	Keep on Dancin' Re-released on No Song Left Unsung in 2020
2015	"1983"	Still of the Night Re-released on Butterflies in December in 2020
2015	"Still of the Night (feat. Charlotte Munck)"	Still of the Night
2015	"I'm Not Ready Yet"	Still of the Night Re-released on No Song Left Unsung in 2020
2015	"Will Santa Be There for Christmas?"	—N/a
2018	"They Say It's Wrong"	Re-released on No Song Left Unsung in 2020
2018	"Who Am I (feat. Marina)"	—N/a
2018	"I Don't Care (feat. Marina)"	—N/a
2020	"All Said and Done"	—N/a
2020	"Here We Go (feat. Marina)"	Here We Go
2020	"Don't Come Crying (2020 edit)"	Here We Go
2020	"Butterflies in December"	Butterflies in December
2020	"You & I (Forever Live or Die)"	You & I (Forever Live or Die)
2020	"You & I (Forever Live or Die) - Gregers Remix"	You & I (Forever Live or Die)
2020	"If Love Is the New Black"	—N/a
2020	"Your Love Is Wasted on Me (feat. Marina)"	Your Love Is Wasted on Me
2020	"Lullaby"	Your Love Is Wasted on Me
2020	"Take It on the Chin"	Take It on the Chin
2020	"Will Santa Be Here for Christmas?"	Take It on the Chin
2021	"Last Dance"	—N/a
2021	"Just for a While"	Late to the Party
2021	"A Saturday Afternoon at the End of the World"	—N/a

=== Music videos ===
- 2009: "Run"
- 2014: "No One"
- 2015: "I'm Not Ready Yet"
- 2018: "Who Am I (feat. Marina)"

=== Other ===
Bang has also performed a number of songs as himself:

- 2007: Claes Bang - "Når En Sailor Går I Land" (Otto Brandenburg cover)
- 2014: Nogen Andre - "September" (feat. Claes Bang)
- 2014: Martin Valsted - "Bilist" (feat. Claes Bang)
- 2017: Claes Bang - "Party at the Castle" (The Square Original Motion Picture Soundtrack)
- 2019: Jacob Gurevitsch - "Motivo Loco" (Bang featured in the music video)

== Bibliography ==
=== Audiobooks ===
Year	Title	Author	Publisher	Notes
2013	Fryser jeg	Martin Kongstads	People'sPress	
2016	Tykkere end vand	Carin Gerhardsen	People'sPress	
2016	Frøken Peregrines hjem for sælsomme børn	Ransom Riggs	Gyldendal	Danish version of Miss Peregrine's Home for Peculiar Children
2016	Hollow City	Ransom Riggs	Gyldendal	Danish version of Hollow City
2016	Sjælenes bibliotek	Ransom Riggs	Gyldendal	Danish version of Library of Souls
2017	Chefen	Aksel Heltoft	Lindhardt og Ringhof	
2017	Blodets bånd	Henning Prins	Lindhardt og Ringhof	
2017	Dengang vi var os	René Jacobsen	Gyldendal	
2017	Værelse til leje	Eddie Thomas Petersen	People's Press	
2018	Kokken der holdt op med at rødme	Martin Kongstads	Politikens Forlag	
2020	Spræng-Smith - I BOPA-sabotøren Knud Børge Jensens fodspor	Søren Knudsen	Storyside	Knud Børge Jensen is Bang's father-in-law
2020	Kallocain	Karin Boye	Penguin	
2020	Søvnrummet	Helena Kubicek Boye	Mofibo Original	Part of SØVN, a series of audiobooks designed to help the reader relax and fall asleep
2020	Universet	Helena Kubicek Boye	Mofibo Original	Part of SØVN, a series of audiobooks designed to help the reader relax and fall asleep
2020	Strandliv	Helena Kubicek Boye	Mofibo Original	Part of SØVN, a series of audiobooks designed to help the reader relax and fall asleep
2020	Casper	Martin Kongstad	Politikens Forlag	
2021	De sidste timer – Ingen kender dagen, før solen er gået ned	Frihedsmuseets venners forlag	Storyside AB	Bang is one of the 86 actors who narrate this audiobook

=== Afterwords ===
- 2020: Dracula by Bram Stoker, translated to Danish by Benny Andersen, published by Gyldendal

== Awards and nominations ==
Year	Award	Category	Work	Result	Ref(s)
2017	Subtitle: Spotlight European Film Festival's Angela Awards	Actor	The Square	Won	
2017	European Film Awards	Best Actor	The Square	Won	
2017	Pingyao International Film Festival People's Choice Award	Best Actor	The Square	Won	
2018	Guldbagge Awards	Best Actor in a Leading Role	The Square	Nominated	
2018	Zulu Awards	Best Actor	The Square	Nominated	
2018	Lauritzen Fonden Awards	Wauw Award	N/A	Won	
2018	Ekko Shortlist Awards	Best Actor	Hotel Boy	Nominated	
2020	Mofibo Audiobook Awards 2020	Novel of the Year	Kokken der holdt op med at rødme	Nominated	
2020	TV Choice Awards	Best Actor	Dracula	Nominated	
2021	National Television Awards	Best Drama Performance	Dracula	Nominated	
2022	Peabody Awards	Entertainment	Bad Sisters	Won	
