= Sthyr & Kjær =

Danish grocery wholesaler

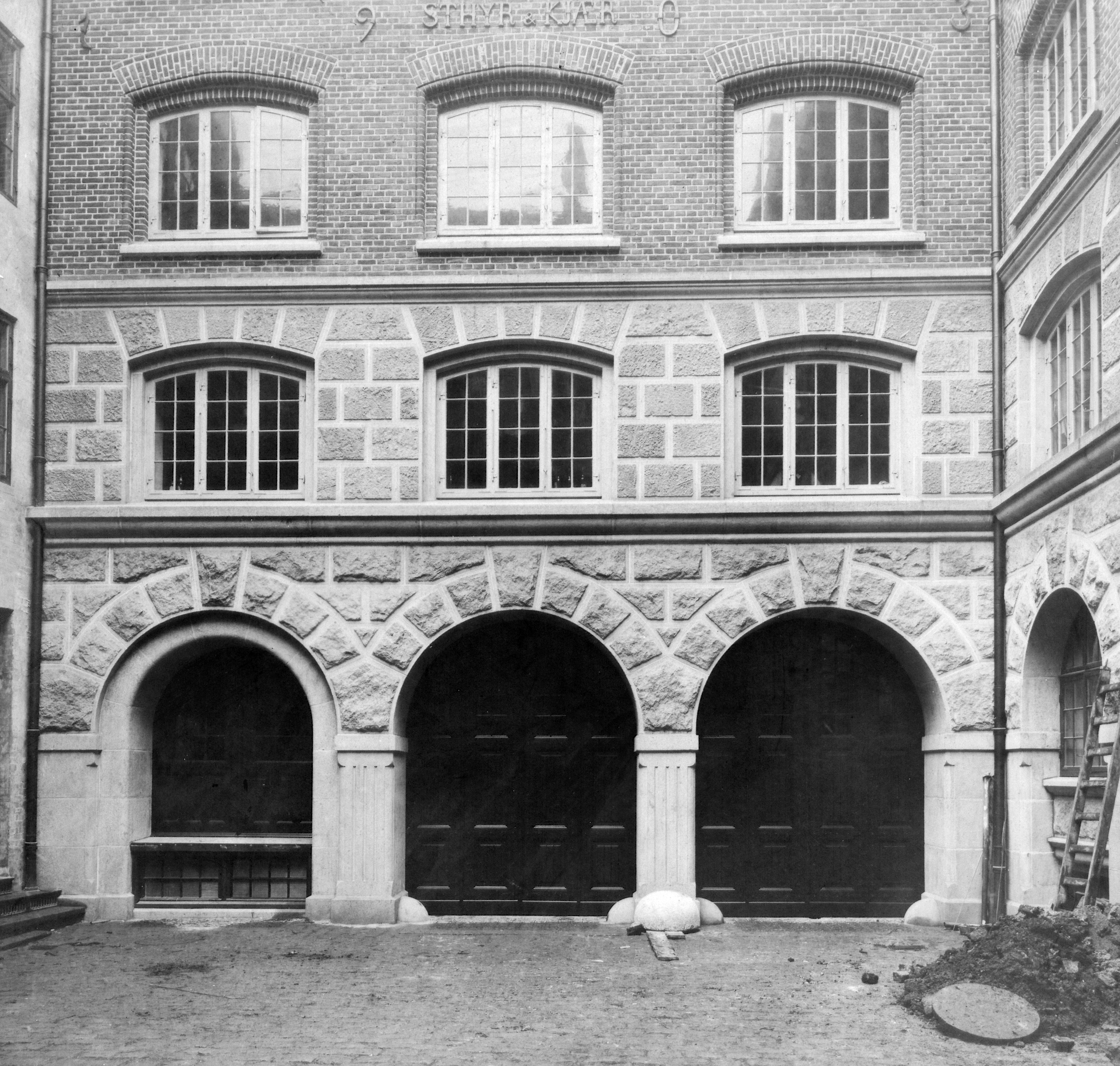
The company's headquarters at Rådhusstræde 13 in 1903.

Sthyr & Kjær was a grocery wholesaler based in Copenhagen, Denmark. In 1978, it was merged with another firm under the name Dagros (after another merger renamed Dagrofa). Since 1970, its former headquarters at the corner of Rådhusstræde and Magstræde has housed the Huset KBH cultural centre (formerly known as "Huset i Magstræde").

== History ==
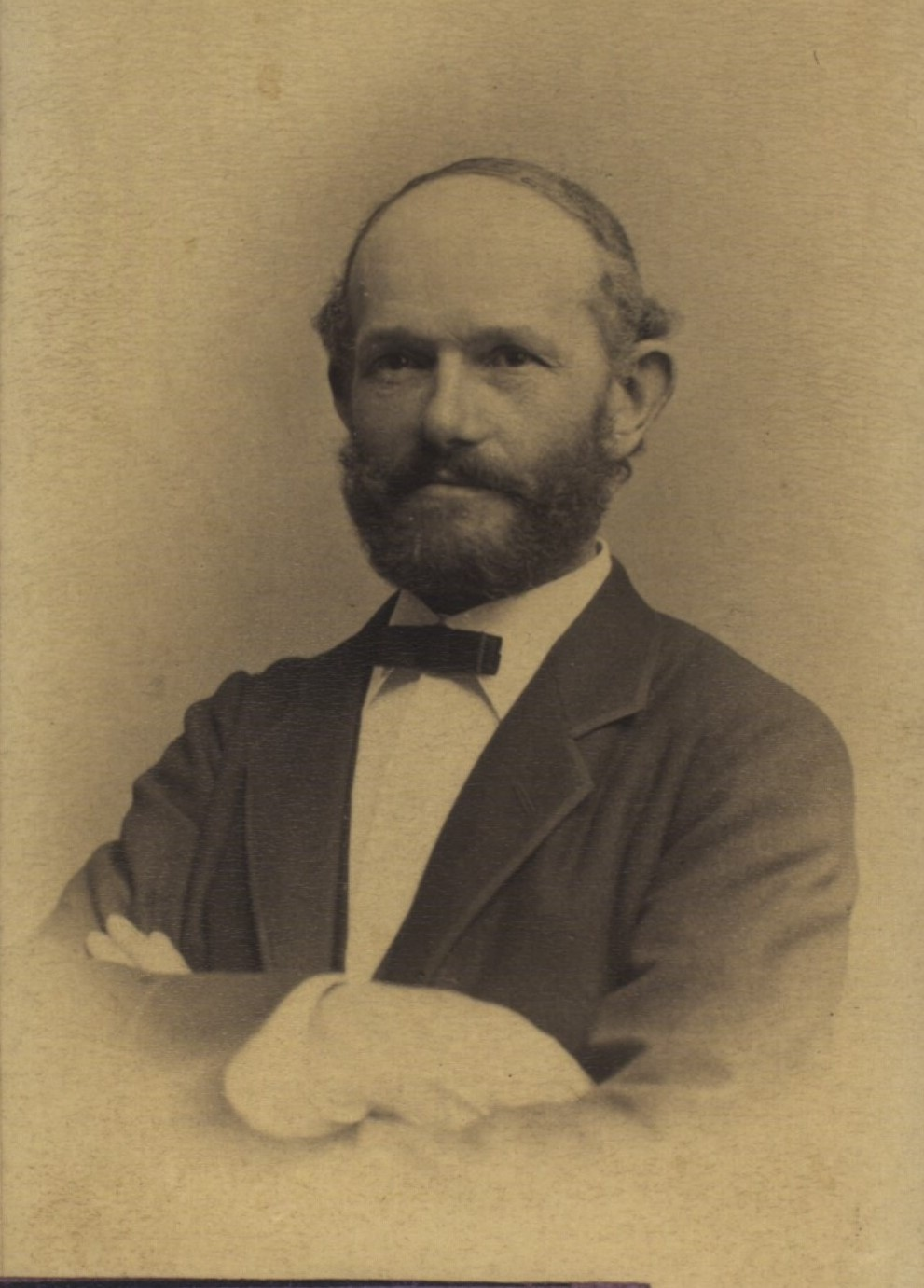
Selgen Sthyr.

The company was founded on 2 August 1866 by Selgen Sthyr (1837–1922) and P. B. Kjær (1835–1911). They knew each other from Adolph's trading firm where they had both worked. Initially, the company was primarily involved in the sugar trade. It bought almost all the sugar that Moses & Søn G. Melchior imported from the Danish West Indies.

In 1875, Selgen Sthyr's brother P. C. A. Sthyr (1835–1916) became a partner. In 1881, Sthyr & Kjær bought the property at Rådhusstræde 13 and made it its new headquarters. It also owned the Niels Brock House on Strandgade in Christianshavn. In 1893, P. B. Kjær retired from the firm. In 1894, Selgen Sthyr's son Hans Hald Sthyr (1868–1944) became a partner.

In 1888, Sthyr & Kjær established a washing soda factory. In 1896, it became part of Akts. Sodafabrikkerne. In 1896, together with Moses & Søn G. Melchior, Sthyr & Kjær established Maribo Sugar Factory on Lolland. In 1898, it was taken over by De Danske Sukkerfabrikker. In 1899, Sthyr & Kjær also established a potato flour factory at Holstebro. It was later converted into a sugar factory. It was destroyed by fire in 1912. It was subsequently moved to Copenhagen where it was continued as A/S Kbh.s Sukkerraffinaderier.

In 1913, P. C. A. Sthyr left the firm. In 1919 Sthyr & Kjær was converted into a limited company with Hald Sthyr as chairman. By the 1920s, Sthyr & Kjær was one of the largest grocery wholesalers in Denmark. The company was the principal supplier of the retail chains CENTRA and SPAR.

In 1978, Sthyr & Kjær was taken over by Lund & Rasmussen and continued as Dagros. The company was later merged with Brdr. Justesen and continued as Dagrofa.

== Legacy ==
In 1969, Copenhagen Municipality bought Sthyr & Kjær's former headquarters at Rådhusstræde 13. It was subsequently converted into a cultural centre, known simply as Huset i Magstræde ("The House in Magstræde"). In the late 1990s, it housed a theatre known as Teater Sthyr & Kjær. Selgen Sthyr is one of the men seen on Peder Severin Krøyer's monumental 1894 oil-on-canvas group portrait painting From Copenhagen Stock Exchange.
