= Husets Teater =

Theatre in Copenhagen, Denmark

Coordinates: 55.6702°N 12.5614°E

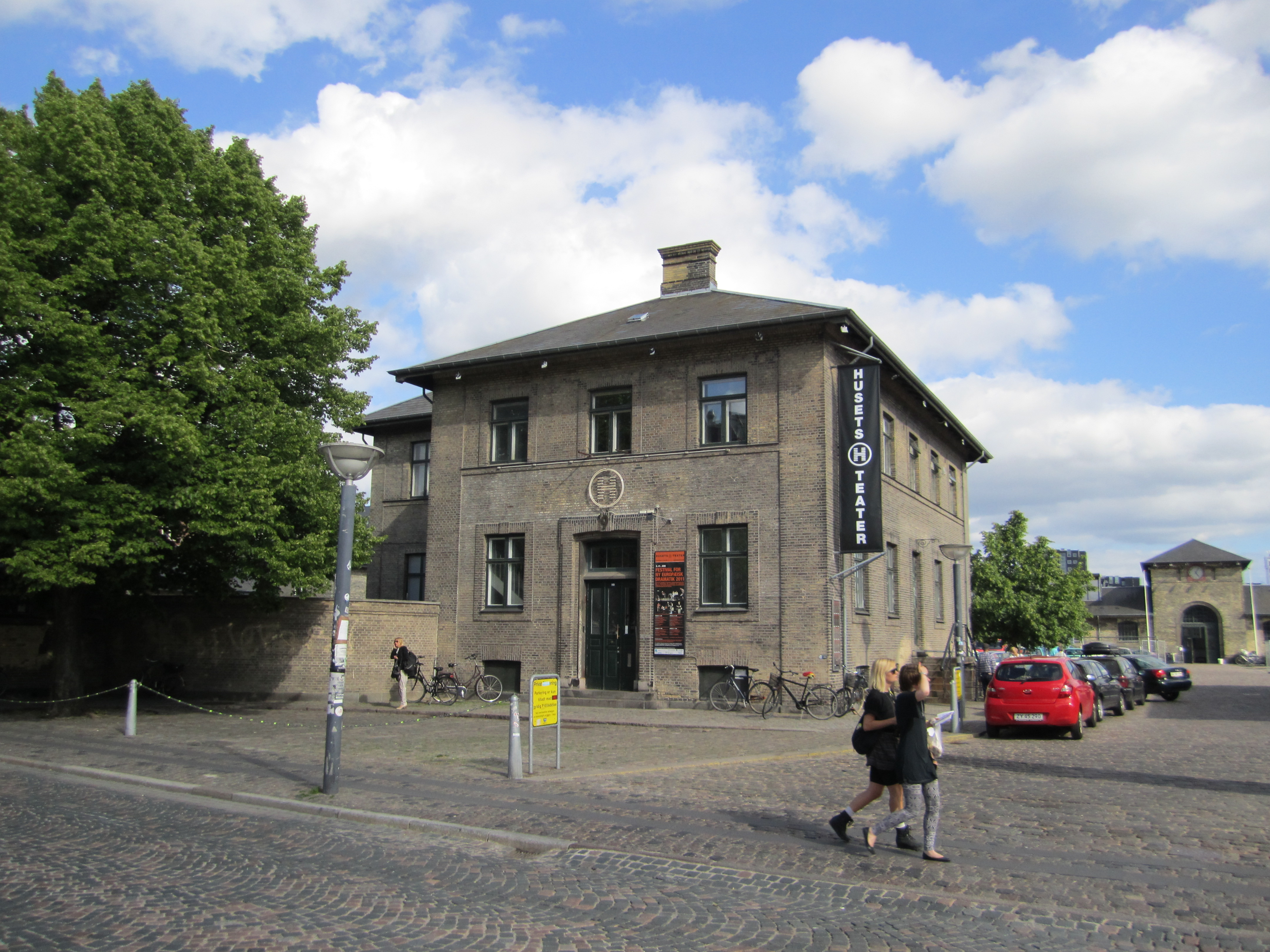
Husets Teater viewed from Halmtorvet

Husets Teater is a studio theatre in Copenhagen, Denmark. It takes its name from the Huset cultural centre in the city centre, where it was founded in 1975, but has since 1995 been based at Halmtorvet in a building which is part of the Kødbyen district.

== History ==
The theatre grew out of the alternative cultural environment around Huset in Magstræde which had grown out of the political protest movement of the late 1960s. From its foundation in 1975, it served as a platform for contemporary political theatre, and both a venue for local ensembles such as Natholdet and frequently playing host to visiting international ensembles from countries such as Sweden and Italy.

From the mid-1980s, the theatre's repertoire became more focused on drama with plays such as Bertholt Brecht's Baal and Rainer Werner Fassbinder's controversial play Garbage, the City, and Death which in Klaus Hoffmeyer's staging caused debate for its rawness.

After a duo consisting of the director Søren Iversen and Lisbeth Sjölin took over the leadership in 1992 and its move to new premises in the Brown Meat District, the theatre has created a profile as a venue for newer Danish and international drama of relevance to people of today: Astrid Saalbach's trilogy Morning and Evening, The Blessed Child and Ashes to Ashes, Dust to Dust (1996–97) and Nicoline Werdelin's The Fanciers (1997) and My Two Sisters (2001). The theatre has won several Reumert Awards in recent years.

From 1 June 2008 the theatre has been headed by a duo consisting of actor and director Mads Wille and dramatist and director Simon K. Boberg. They came from the theatre PLAN-B which from 2002 to 2008 they ran in Husets Teater's old premises on the 4th floor in Magstræde.

== Husets Teater today ==
The theatre has two stages, UnderHuset with 121 numbered seats and OveHuset with 70 unnumbered seats. The names are a play on the Danish words for the House of Commons Underhuset, literally Lower House) and the House of Lords (Overhuset, literally Upper House) and, at the same time, refers to their location in the building.

The theatre is economically subsidised by Copenhagen Municipality.

== See also ==
- Theatre in Denmark
