= Mother's Baby =

2025 Austrian thriller film

- Teaser poster
- Directed by: Johanna Moder
- Written by: Arne Kohlweyer; Johanna Moder
- Produced by: Sabine Moser; Oliver Neumann
- Starring: Marie Leuenberger; Hans Löw; Claes Bang
- Cinematography: Robert Oberrainer
- Edited by: Karin Hammer
- Music by: Diego Ramos Rodriguez
- Production companies: Freibeuter Film; Match Factory Productions; Tellfilm
- Distributed by: Filmladen; The Match Factory
- Release date: 18 February 2025 (Berlinale)
- Running time: 108 minutes
- Countries: Austria; Switzerland; Germany
- Language: German

Mother's Baby is a 2025 thriller film co-written and directed by Johanna Moder. The film follows Julia, a 40-year-old woman, whose dream of having her own family turns into a nightmare, as she struggles to build a bond with her newborn child.

The international co-production between Austria, Switzerland, and Germany, was selected in the Competition at the 75th Berlin International Film Festival, where it competed for the Golden Bear and had first screening on 18 February 2025 at Berlinale Palast.

== Synopsis ==
Julia, a 40-year-old successful conductor, and her partner Georg have longed to become parents. Julia becomes pregnant after successful fertility treatment at Dr. Vilfort clinic. However, complications arise during delivery, and the baby is taken away, without telling Julia. When she finally meets her child, she feels an unexpected sense of detachment and begins to question if the baby is truly hers.

== Cast ==
- Marie Leuenberger as Julia
- Hans Löw as Georg
- Claes Bang as Dr. Vilfort
- Julia Franz Richter as Gerlinde
- Judith Altenberger as Social worker
- Nina Fog as Renata
- Tchuci as Matilda
- Caroline Frank as Elisabeth
- Greta Stranka as Luisa
- Selina Ströbele as Konzertmeisterin
- Rupert M. as Lehofer
- Julia Koch as Anna
- Andreas Ortner as Manuel
- Mona Kospach as Franziska
- Laura Preiss as Fremde Frau

== Production ==
Principal photography began on 6 March 2024 at locations in Wien, Zürich, Hamburg. Filming ended on 24 April 2024 in locations in Austria – Vienna, Germany – Hamburg, Swiss – Zürich.

== Release ==
Mother's Baby had its world premiere on 18 February 2025, as part of the 75th Berlin International Film Festival, in Competition.

It competed in the International competition section of the 56th International Film Festival of India in November 2025.

=== Critical reception ===
On the review aggregator website Rotten Tomatoes, 73% of 15 critics' reviews are positive.

== Accolades ==
Award	Date of ceremony	Category	Recipient	Result	Ref.
Berlin International Film Festival	23 February 2025	Golden Bear	Mother's Baby	Nominated	
Sitges Film Festival	19 October 2025	Best Feature Film	Mother's Baby	Nominated	
Biberach Film Festival	2 November 2025	Best Feature Film	Mother's Baby	Won	
International Film Festival of India	28 November 2025	Golden Peacock	Mother's Baby	Nominated	
