= Dracula (2020 TV series) =

British horror series

- Genre: Drama; Gothic horror
- Created by: Mark Gatiss; Steven Moffat
- Based on: Dracula by Bram Stoker
- Written by: Mark Gatiss; Steven Moffat
- Directed by: Jonny Campbell; Damon Thomas; Paul McGuigan
- Starring: Claes Bang; Dolly Wells; John Heffernan
- Composers: David Arnold; Michael Price
- Country of origin: United Kingdom
- Original language: English
- No. of series: 1
- No. of episodes: 3

Production
- Executive producers: Mark Gatiss; Steven Moffat; Sue Vertue; Ben Irving
- Producer: Sue Vertue
- Running time: 88–91 minutes
- Production company: Hartswood Films

Original release
- Network: BBC One; Netflix
- Release: 1 January – 3 January 2020

Dracula is a horror drama television serial developed by Mark Gatiss and Steven Moffat, loosely based on the 1897 novel of the same name by Bram Stoker. The series, consisting of three episodes, premiered on 1 January 2020 and was broadcast over three consecutive days on BBC One before releasing on Netflix. Claes Bang stars as the title character.

== Premise ==
The series follows Dracula from his origins in Eastern Europe to his battles with Van Helsing's descendants and beyond. Netflix's description reads: "The Count Dracula legend transforms with new tales that flesh out the vampire's gory crimes – and bring his vulnerability into the light."

== Cast ==
- Claes Bang as Count Dracula
- Dolly Wells as Sister Agatha Van Helsing / Zoe Van Helsing
- John Heffernan as Jonathan Harker
- Morfydd Clark as Mina Murray
- Joanna Scanlan as Mother Superior
- Lujza Richter as Elena
- Jonathan Aris as Captain Sokolov
- Sacha Dhawan as Dr Sharma
- Nathan Stewart-Jarrett as Adisa
- Clive Russell as Valentin
- Catherine Schell as Duchess Valeria
- Patrick Walshe McBride as Lord Ruthven
- Lily Dodsworth-Evans as Dorabella
- Youssef Kerkour as Olgaren
- Samuel Blenkin as Piotr
- Alec Utgoff as Abramoff
- Natasha Radski as Mother
- Lydia West as Lucy Westenra
- Matthew Beard as Jack Seward
- Mark Gatiss as Frank Renfield
- Chanel Cresswell as Kathleen
- Lyndsey Marshal as Bloxham
- Paul Brennen as Commander Irving
- John McCrea as Zev
- Phil Dunster as Quincey Morris
- Sarah Niles as Meg

== Episodes ==
No.	Title	Directed by	Written by	Original release date	UK viewers (millions)
1	"The Rules of the Beast"	Jonny Campbell	Mark Gatiss and Steven Moffat	1 January 2020	6.99
Jonathan Harker travels to Count Dracula's castle in Transylvania to assist with a property purchase in England. During Harker's stay, Dracula feeds on his blood and becomes youthful, while Jonathan becomes increasingly weak. Harker searches the castle, and discovers various undead, all of whom were bitten by Dracula. Some retain some of their humanity and Dracula describes them as his brides. Dracula kills Harker, who immediately revives and throws himself into the river. Some time later Harker is found in the sea and taken to a convent, but his memories are impaired. He is questioned by Sister Agatha Van Helsing, accompanied by his fiancée, Mina. After almost attacking Mina, Harker tries to kill himself with a stake. Dracula, drawn by Harker's presence, arrives at the convent but is unable to enter without an invitation. After a verbal confrontation with Van Helsing, Dracula finds Harker, who is still undead, and addresses him through an open window. Explaining that the undead cannot kill themselves, he promises to end Harker's existence in return for an invitation inside. Harker agrees and Dracula enters, killing all the nuns ("I'm undead, not unreasonable.") except Van Helsing and Mina, whom he corners in a basement.
2	"Blood Vessel"	Damon Thomas	Mark Gatiss and Steven Moffat	2 January 2020	5.58
Dracula is a passenger on the Demeter, which has been chartered to sail to England by a mysterious figure named Balaur. It carries other passengers, all of whom have a connection to Balaur, and cargo which includes boxes of soil from Transylvania. Dracula begins to kill passengers and crew, acquiring their memories and traits. It transpires that Dracula was Balaur and carefully selected his fellow passengers to prepare for his entrance into English society. The surviving passengers and crew search for the killer and discover an emaciated Agatha Van Helsing in one of the cabins. Dracula, who has been slowly draining her during the voyage, attempts to blame Agatha for the killings, but she convinces the others that Dracula is a vampire. After the surviving humans manage to set him on fire, Dracula throws himself into the sea. As the ship approaches Whitby, Dracula, who had been hiding on the ship, miraculously re-emerges. Agatha distracts him while the captain uses gunpowder to blow up the ship and prevent the vampire from reaching the shore. Dracula, however, manages to seal himself inside a coffin filled with his native soil as the ship sinks.
3	"The Dark Compass"	Paul McGuigan	Mark Gatiss and Steven Moffat	3 January 2020	5.22
Dracula emerges from his coffin and surfaces on Whitby beach. He is met by Dr. Zoe Van Helsing, who tells him that 123 years have passed. He tries to feed on her, but her blood makes him vomit. He is imprisoned in a laboratory for study, and his blood is sampled. However, he contacts a lawyer who threatens to expose their illegal operations, and he is released. Zoe drinks Dracula's blood and begins to experience Sister Agatha's memories. Dracula becomes infatuated by Lucy Westenra, a young socialite who does not fear him, and plans to make her his bride. Zoe, dying of cancer, begins to merge with Agatha's personality. Zoe travels to Dracula's London home. Lucy, now undead, also arrives but is horrified at what she has become, and is killed at her own request. Zoe exposes Dracula to the sunlight, but he is unaffected. Zoe explains that Dracula fears death above all and is greatly ashamed of this. He has conditioned himself to believe the legends as they allowed him to hide himself from the society that he feels unworthy of. Zoe dies and Dracula drinks her poisoned blood. The two share an epiphany in the sunlight.

== Production ==
=== Development ===
Development on Dracula began in June 2017, with Mark Gatiss and Steven Moffat reuniting to write the episodes. In October 2018, the series was officially commissioned by the BBC, to air on BBC One and Netflix. Claes Bang was set to star as the eponymous Dracula in November 2018. According to the writers, Dracula in their version is "the hero of his own story" – the central focus of the narrative and main character, rather than a shadowy villain for more traditional heroes to overcome. As with their TV series Sherlock, they aimed to make their version of Dracula both faithful and faithless at the same time, taking details from the original novel, adding "a lot of new stuff" [that was not in the novel] and ignoring some passages from it.

While the series includes a scene in which it is implied that Dracula and Harker have sex, Moffat has said that it is not correct to describe their interpretation of Dracula as bisexual: "He's bi-homicidal, it's not the same thing. He's killing them, not dating them." He also added: "He's not actually having sex with anyone. He's drinking their blood."

=== Casting ===
In February 2019, John Heffernan, Dolly Wells, Joanna Scanlan, Morfydd Clark and Lujza Richter joined the cast, with Gatiss also set to appear in the series. In April, Jonathan Aris, Sacha Dhawan, Nathan Stewart-Jarrett, Catherine Schell, Youssef Kerkour and Clive Russell joined the cast with Jonny Campbell, Damon Thomas and Paul McGuigan announced as directors.

=== Filming ===
Moffat revealed filming on the series had begun on 4 March 2019. Filming took place at Orava Castle, Banská Štiavnica and Zuberec in Slovakia and at Bray Studios in Berkshire. Filming was completed on 1 August 2019. Bray Studios was the home of many Hammer Film Productions, the studio, having been initiated by the company (famed for its horror films including Dracula) as their base of productions in the 1950s.

=== Title sequence ===
The title sequence was made by Peter Anderson Studio. In 2021 it was nominated for a BAFTA at the British Academy Television Craft Awards in the category "Television Craft – Titles & Graphic Identity".

== Release ==
=== Broadcast ===
Dracula premiered on BBC One on 1 January 2020, and was broadcast over three consecutive days. The three episodes were released on Netflix on 4 January 2020. The documentary In Search of Dracula, with Mark Gatiss exploring the legacy of the famous Count, aired alongside the series on BBC Two on 3 January. The overnight ratings for the three episodes were 3.60 million, 2.85 million, and 2.70 million respectively.

=== Marketing ===
To mark the series premiere, BBC Creative and Talon Outdoor constructed billboards stabbed with wooden stakes that would cast a shadow of the Count after sunset, and below the billboards was a stake inside a case with the label "In case of vampires – break glass". These billboards were put up on Brixton Road in London and Upper Dean Street in Birmingham. The billboards won a number of awards and £100,000 worth of media space for the creators at the 2020 Outdoor Media Awards organised by Clear Channel UK in partnership with Campaign.

== Reception ==
=== Critical reception ===
The series was met with positive reviews. On Rotten Tomatoes, the series garnered a 71% approval and an average rating of 7.2/10 from 55 critic reviews. The website's critical consensus reads, "A delicious blend of horror and humor that more-or-less balances modern sensibilities and the character's beloved legacy, Dracula is a frighteningly fun – if not always faithful – time". Metacritic assigned the series a score of 75 out of 100, based on 8 reviews, signifying "generally-favorable reviews".

=== Accolades ===
Year	Award	Category	Nominee	Result	Ref(s)
2020	Outdoor Media Awards	Visual Craft Award	Talon Outdoor/Havas Media; BBC Media Planning/BBC Creative	Gold	
2020	Outdoor Media Awards	Installation and Experience Award	Talon Outdoor/Havas Media; BBC Media Planning/BBC Creative	Gold	
2020	Outdoor Media Awards	Grand Prix Winner	Talon Outdoor/Havas Media; BBC Media Planning/BBC Creative	Won	
2020	TV Choice Awards	Best New Drama	Dracula	Nominated	
2020	TV Choice Awards	Best Actor	Claes Bang	Nominated	
2021	National Television Awards	Best New Drama	Dracula	Nominated	
2021	Saturn Awards	Best Television Presentation (under 10 Episodes)	Dracula	Nominated	

== Future ==
In February 2020, Bang expressed his interest in a second series. Gatiss said "Apparently if you pour blood onto Dracula's ashes he comes back. Who knows? Dracula tends to come back, that's what vampires do – but we have no idea [if the show will return]".
