= Schäffer House =

Building in Copenhagen, Denmark

- Hofsnedkerens Gård
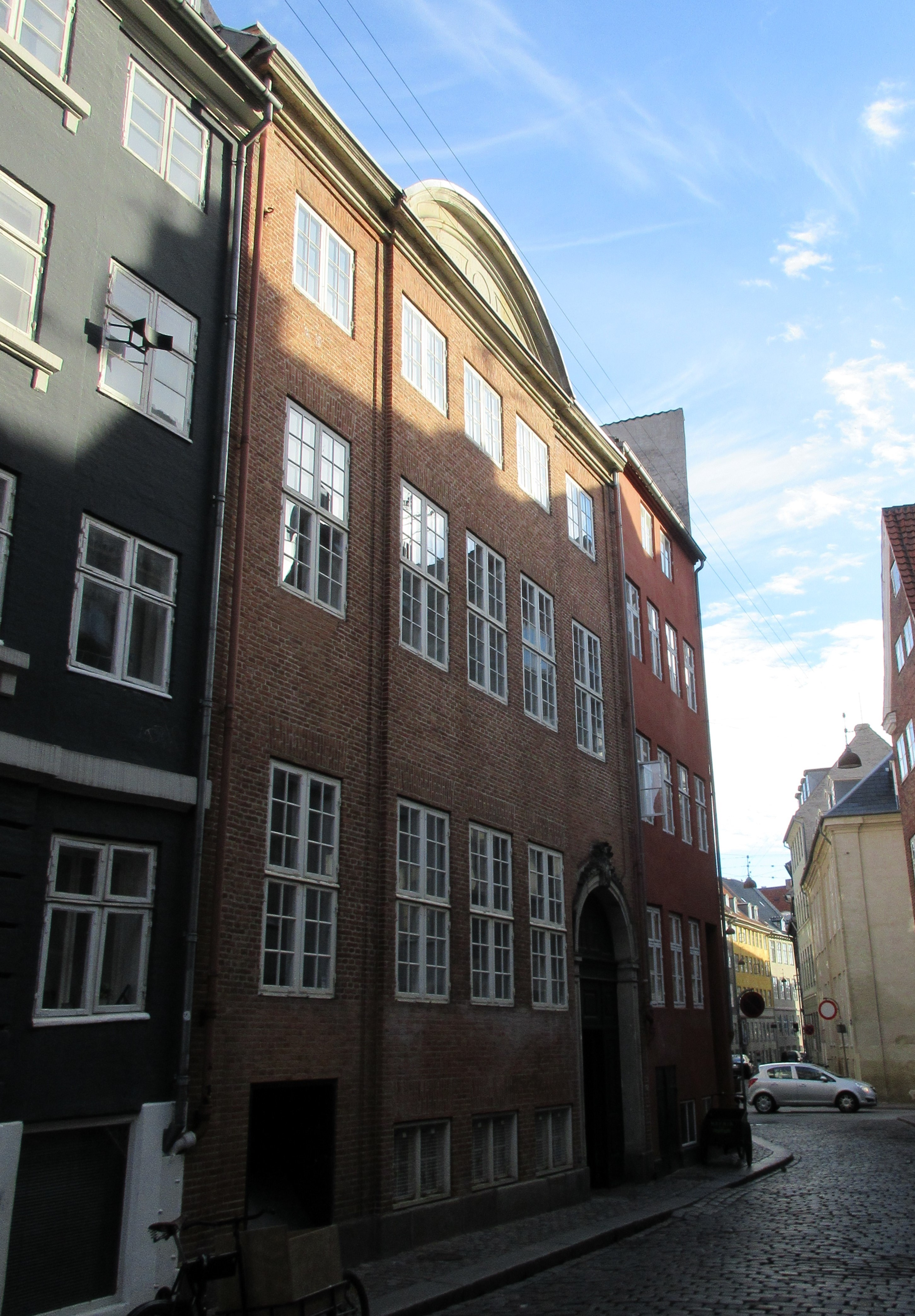
- The Schäffer House
- Interactive map of the Schäffer House area

General information
- Architectural style: Baroque
- Location: Copenhagen, Denmark
- Coordinates: 55°40′35.63″N 12°34′32.75″E
- Construction started: 1733
- Completed: 1734
- Client: Diderich Schäffer

Design and construction
- Architect: Philip de Lange

The Schäffer House is an 18th-century, bourgeois townhouse located at Magstræde 6 in the Old Town of Copenhagen, Denmark. The building is also called Hofsnedkerens Gård after Diderich Schäffer for whom it was built. Schäffer's interior Rococo decorations from the first floor are now on display in the National Museum as part of the Magstræde Apartment.

== History ==
=== Diderich Schäffer ===
The property was in 1689 as No. 43 in Snaren's Quarter owned by brewer Henrik Andersen. The property was together with most of the other buildings in the area destroyed in the Copenhagen Fire of 1728. The current building on the site was constructed in 1733-34 by master builder Philip de Lange for court joiner Diderich Schäffer. He had been called to Denmark in circa 1730 to work on the new Christiansborg Palace. He lived in the ground-floor apartment and had his workshop in the rear wing and possibly part of the side wing. The more elegant apartment on the first floor was rented out.

In 1755–56, Schäffer constructed the country house Schæffergården at Jægersborg north of Copenhagen. His plan was to sell it but it proved difficult and he ended up owning it until 1771. He died in 1778.

=== Johan Gierløf ===
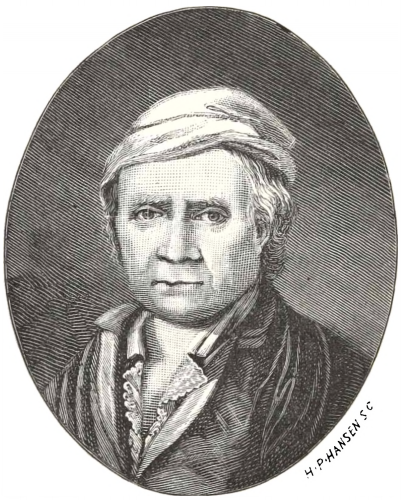
Johan Gierløf

The property was on 11 June 1749 sold to Johan Gierløf. Johan Gierløf (1709-1800) was the fifth son of brewer Chr. Gierløf and Rachel Jørgensdatter. He had together with his brother Christian continued the family's brewery in Vestergade but they had both turned to porcelain. Johan Gierløf had started a lucrative import of porcelain from Saxony while the brother had become the proprietor of Store Kongensgade Faience Manufactury. On 5 April 1759, Gierløf was licensed as a wholesaler (grosserer). In 1768, he purchased a property in Stormgade but without parting with the house in Magstræde.

The historian and civil servant Ove Malling lived in the building from 1776 to 1780. The naval officer Peder Norden Sølling lived in the building in 1787–88. He is most notable for founding Bombebøssen in Christianshavn.

Johan Gierløfkept the house in Magstræde until his death in 1800.

=== 19th century ===
The property was in the new cadastre of 19+7 listed as Snaren's Quarter, No. 30. It was by then still owned by Gherløf's heirs.

At the time of the 1840 census, Snaren's Quarter, No. 30 was home to a total of 39 people. At the time of the 1860 census, it was home to a total of 31 people.

== Architecture ==
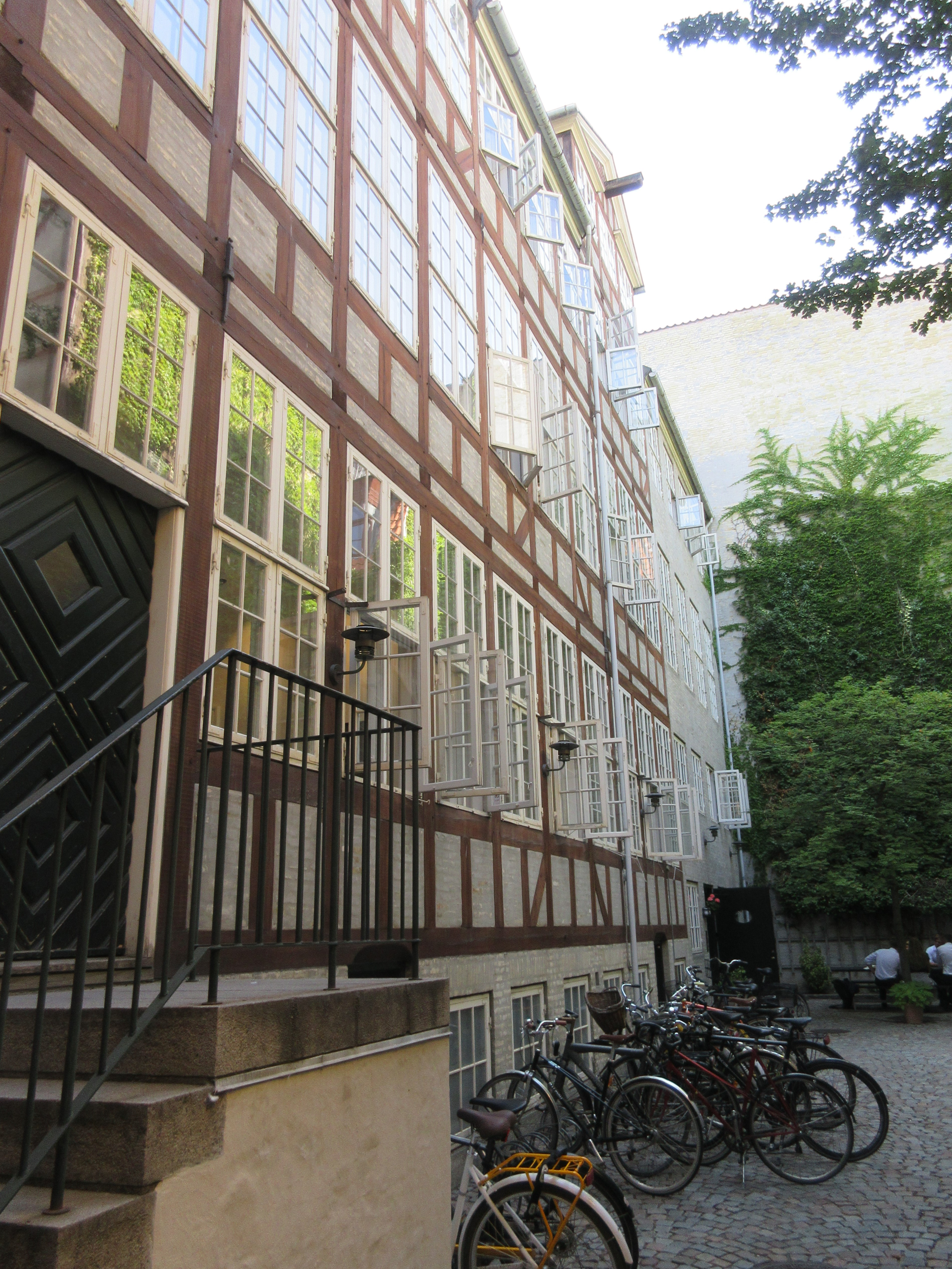
The 13, bay, half-timbered side wing

The house is five bays wide and has a three-bay central projection. The rounded pediment was added in 1850. The rear side of the building is built with exposed timber framing.

The gateway opens to a long, narrow courtyard. A 13 bay long side wing with exposed timber framing extends from the rear side of the building along the left-hand side of the courtyard. A rear wing is located at the bottom of the courtyard.

== Interior ==
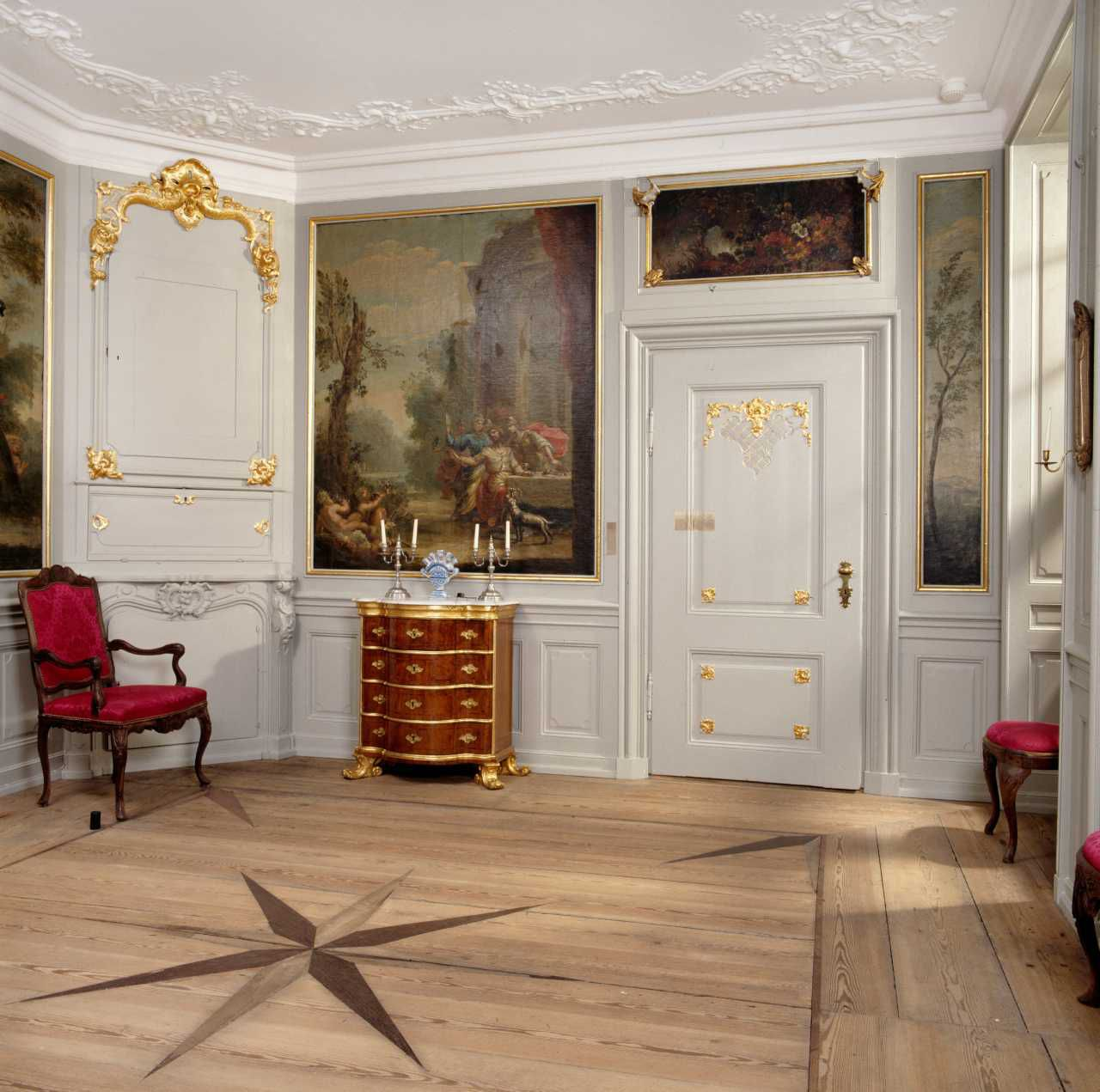
of the Magstræde interiors now on display in the National Museum

Schäffer's rich interior Rococo decorations from his house are now on display in the National Museum.

== See also ==
- Listed buildings in Copenhagen Municipality
