= Huset (Copenhagen) =

Cultural centre in central Copenhagen, Denmark

- Interactive map of Huset
- Address: Rådhusstræde 13; Copenhagen; Denmark
- Coordinates: 55.6764284°N 12.5747739°E

Website
- www.huset.kk.dk

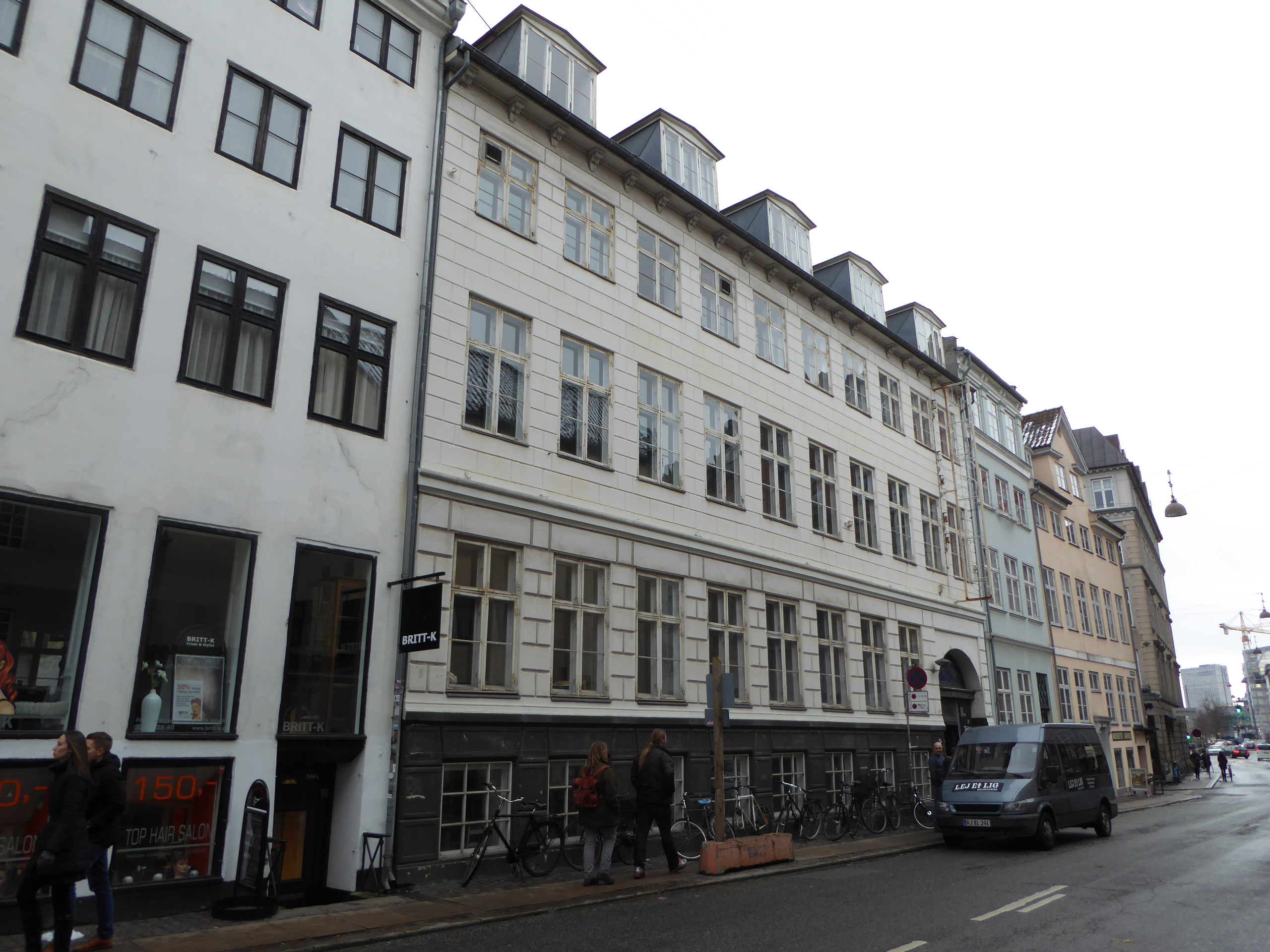
Rådhusstræde 13

Huset is a cultural centre located at Rådhusstræde 13 in central Copenhagen, Denmark. It occupies three old townhouses at Rådhusstræde 13 and Magstræde 12–14 as well as a former warehouse. The building at Rådhusstræde 13 was listed in the Danish registry of protected buildings and places in 1945.

== History ==
The building at Rådhusstræde 13 was built in 1730–34 after the previous building at the site had been destroyed in the Copenhagen Fire of 1728. It just escaped the Copenhagen Fire of 1795 and was in 1802 heightened by one storey.

The building at Magstræde 12 was built for brewer Peder Børgesen in 1830–31. It was heightened by one storey in 1920. The physicist Ludvig Lorenz (1829–1891) was a resident in the building at Magstræde 14 in 1860–61.

The building was in 1881 acquired by the wholesaler Sthyr & Kjær. The company bought the two adjacent properties at Magstræde 12 and 14 in 1903 and a new warehouse was at the same time constructed at the site. The entire complex was in 1969 acquired by Copenhagen Municipality. It was adapted for its new use as youth house with the assistance of the architect Georg Rotne in 1973.

Rådhusstræde 13 was at the time of the 1906 census only home to a single family. Jens Henrik Petersen, Sthyr & Kjær's warehouse manager, resided in the garret with his wife Eleonora Benthine Mathilde Petersen, their four children (aged 11 to 22) and the 18-year-old warehouse worker Carl Ferdinand Nielsen.

== Architecture ==
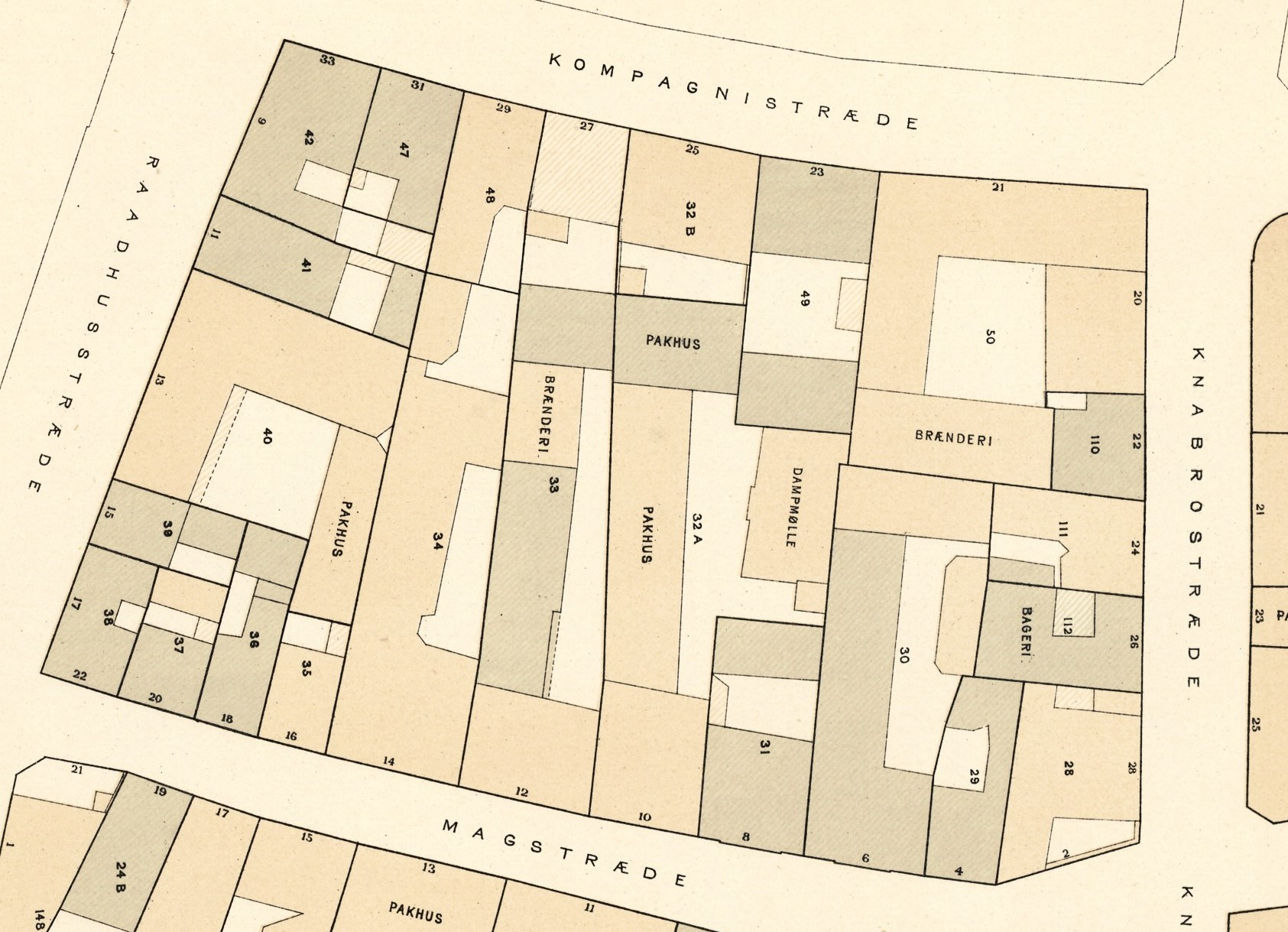
Rådhustræde 13 and Magstræde 12-14 seen on a detail from Berggreen's cadastral map of Snaren's Quarter, 1884.

The building at Rådhusstræde 13 was originally a two-storey townhouse with a four-bay wall dormer. This building was in 1802 heightened by one storey and a roof with five dormer windows. The facade was adapted in the Neoclassical style with inspiration from Karl Friedrich Schinkel's architecture.

Smaller rooms on the two lower floors were in the 1900s merged into one large room on each floor. Sections of the original stucco decorations from the 1740s were copied and used for creating the current stucco ceilings. They are in the Rococo style and have details inspired by François de Cuvilliés.
