= Carin Gerhardsen =

Swedish author of crime fiction (born 1962)

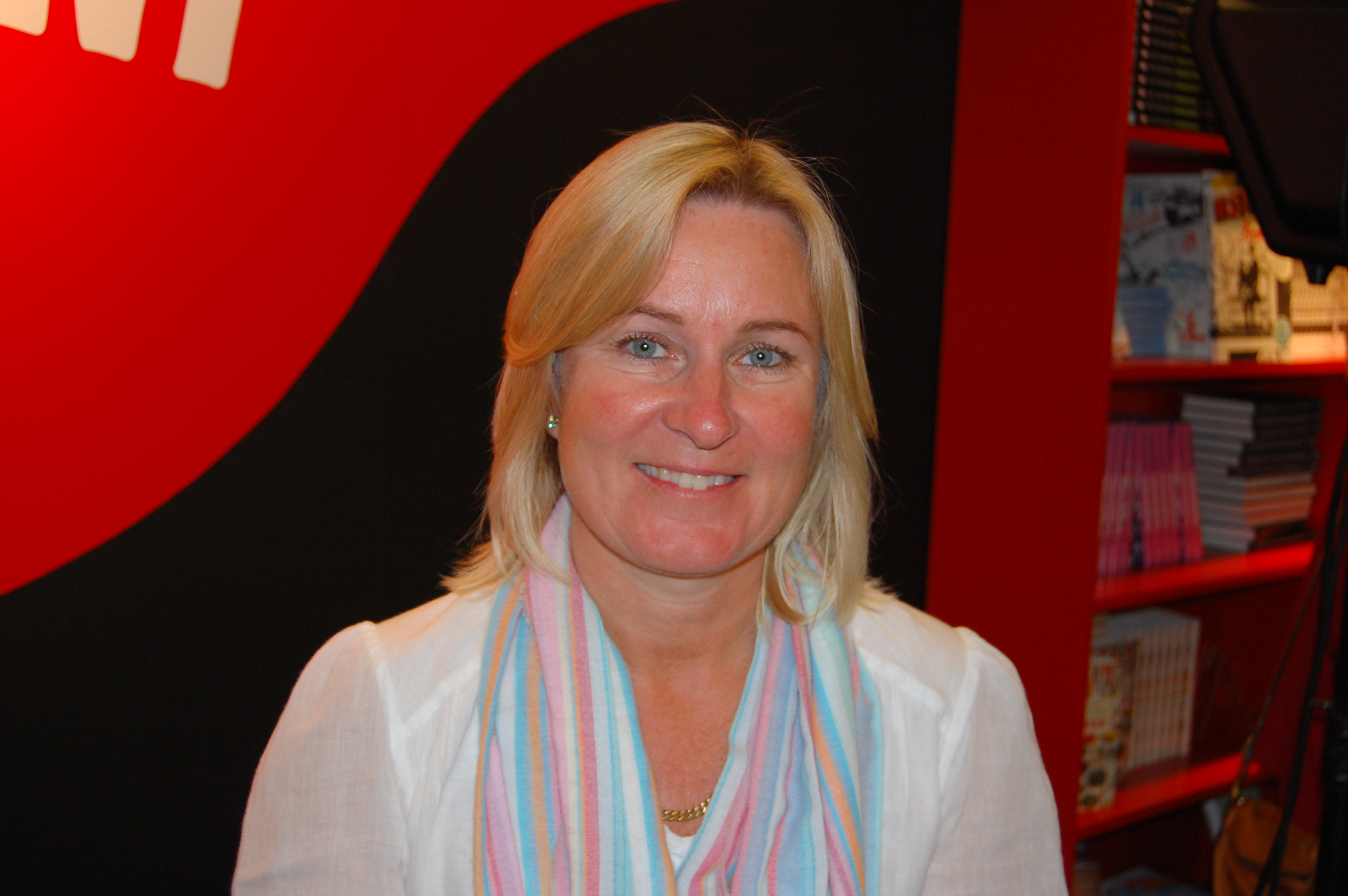
Carin Gerhardsen during Gothenburg Book Fair 2009

Carin Gerhardsen (born December 6, 1962, in Katrineholm, Sweden) is a Swedish author of crime fiction.

Originally a mathematician, Gerhardsen worked as an IT-consultant before becoming a full-time writer. Her mathematical knowledge is visible in her novels, which contain advanced calculated intrigues. Her popular book series The Hammarby Series, circles around Detective Inspector Conny Sjöberg and his team solving cruel and brutal murders in the southern parts of Stockholm. In 2012 her first novel in the series The Gingerbread House was released in America by the publishing house Stockholm Text.

Gerhardsen lives on Östermalm in Stockholm with her husband and children.

== Bibliography ==
- (1992) På flykt undan tiden
- (2008) Pepparkakshuset; English translation: The Gingerbread House (2012)
- (2008) Mamma, pappa, barn; English translation: Cinderella Girl (2013)
- (2010) Vyssan lull
- (2011) Helgonet
- (2012) Gideons ring
- (2013) Hennes iskalla ögon
- (2014) Tjockare än vatten
- (2015) Falleri Fallera Falleralla
- (2021) Black Ice
