= Magstræde =

Street in Copenhagen, Denmark

Coordinates: 55.6764°N 12.5755°E

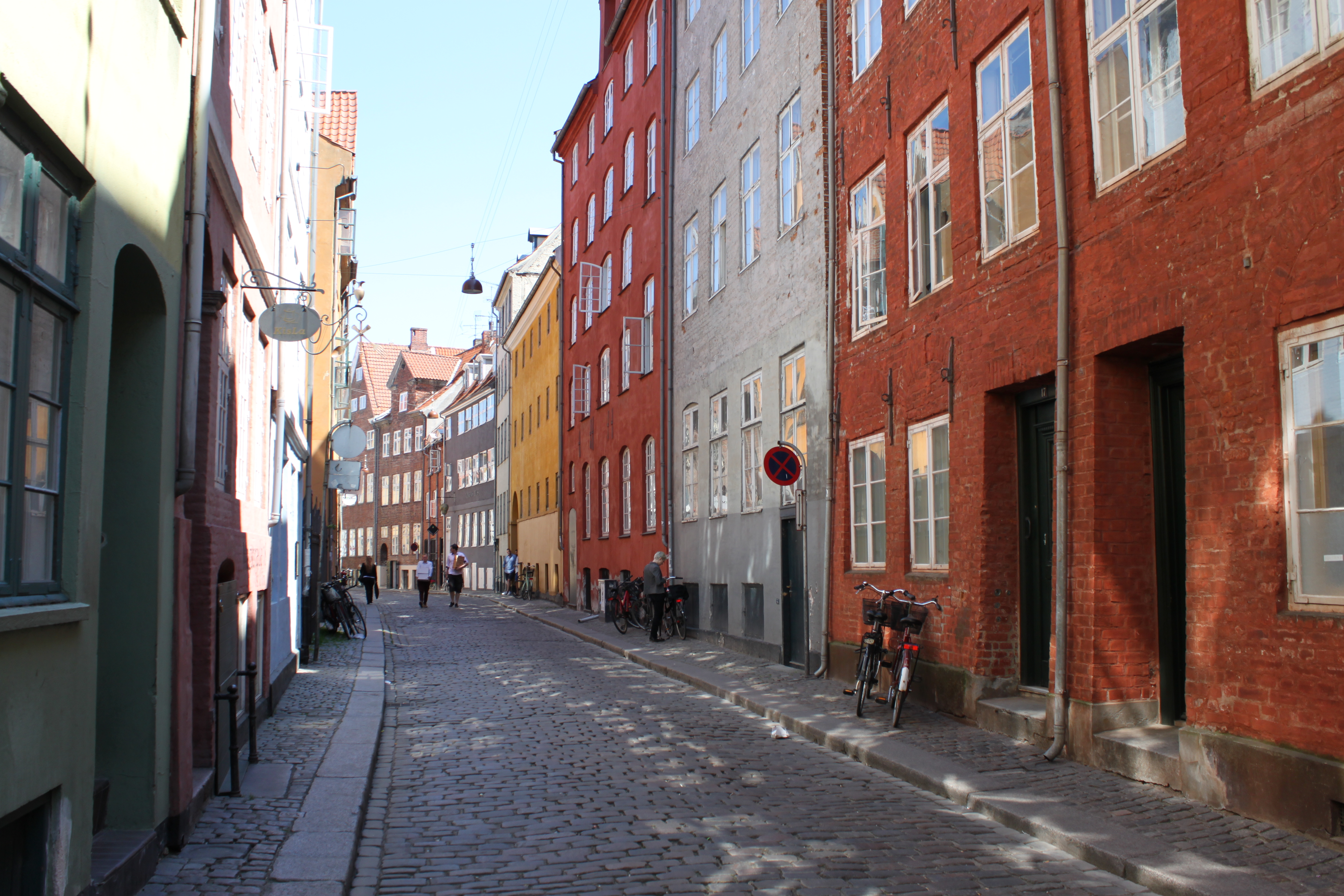
Magstræde

Snaregade and Magstræde are two of the oldest streets in the Old Town of Copenhagen, Denmark, linking Gammel Strand at their eastern end with Rådhusstræde to the west. Snaregade extends from the small square at the Gammel Strand metro station to Knabrostræde where it turns into Magstræde. The streets are among the few streets in the Old Town of Copenhagen which still feature their original cobbling. Magstræde is associated with Huset i Magstræde ("The House in Magstræde"), now officially referred to as Huset KBH ("The House CPH"", "CPH" being short for "Copenhagen"), a culture house.

== History ==
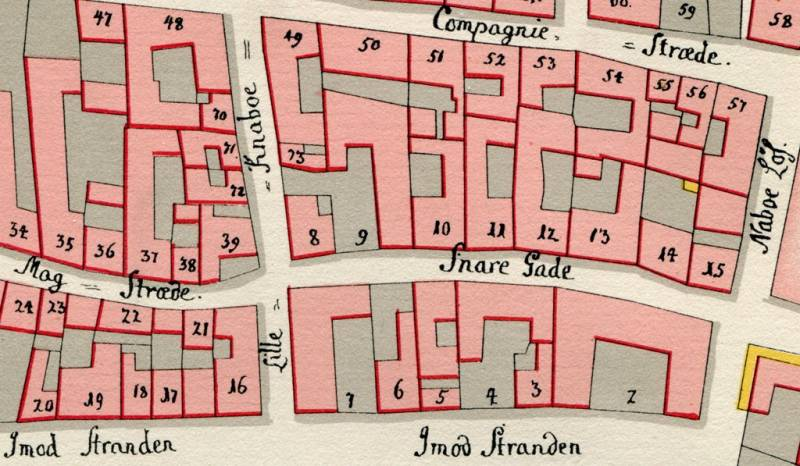
Snaregade and the first part of Magstræde as seen on Gedde's map of Copenhagen

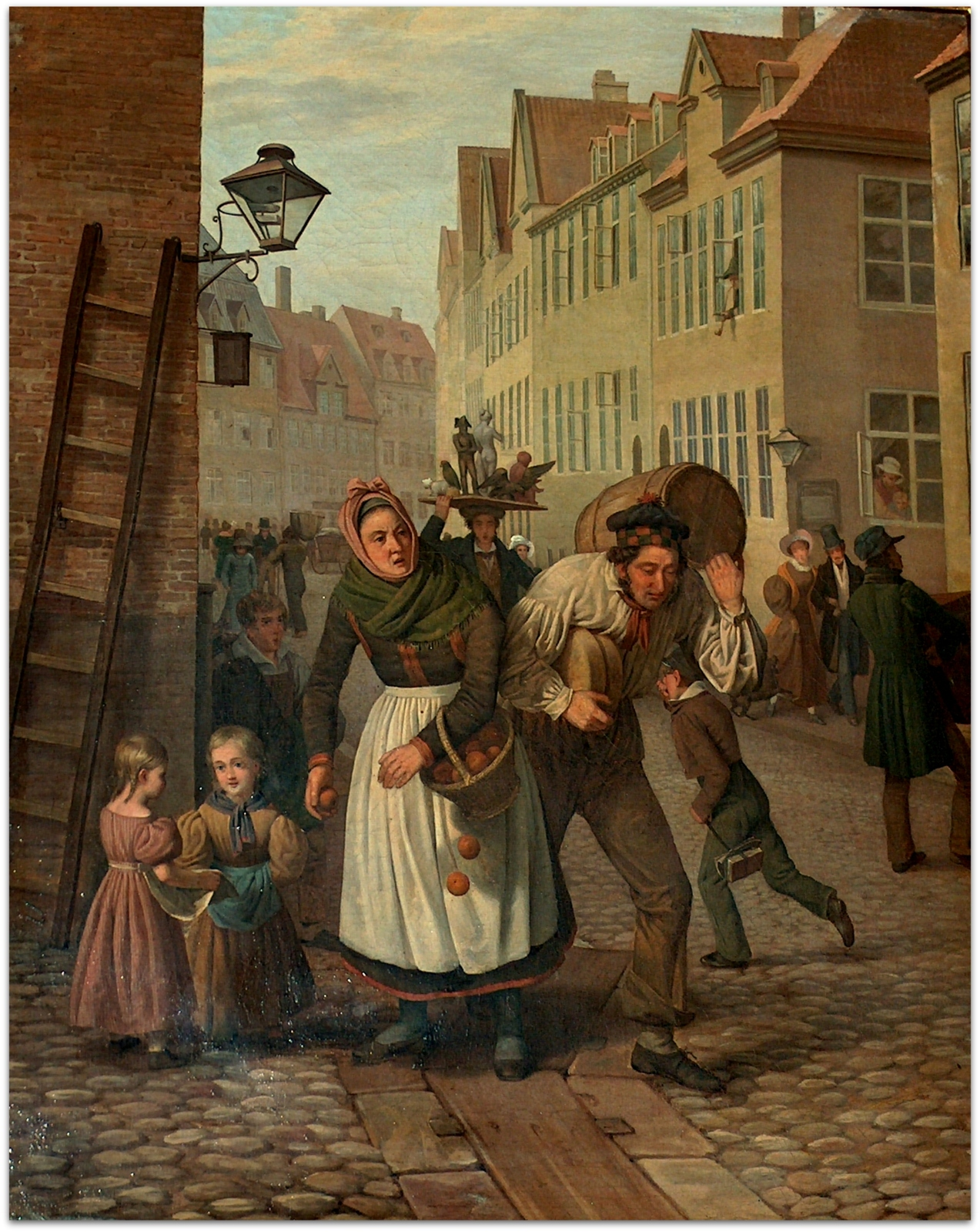
Magstræde in 1834, painting by Edvard Lehmann

Magstræde was created in the 1520s when the coastline was moved to present day Nybrogade. The first part of the name, Mag-, is an old word for a lavatory, referring to a public latrine, Vestre Mag ("Western Mag"), which was located at the site. Another one, Østre Mag (Eastern Mag"), was located at the end of Hyskenstræde.

Snaregade received its current name in 1607. It takes its name after Erling Jonssøn Snare, a former member of the city council who had owned a property on the street from 1501.

== Notable buildings and residents ==
=== Snaregade ===
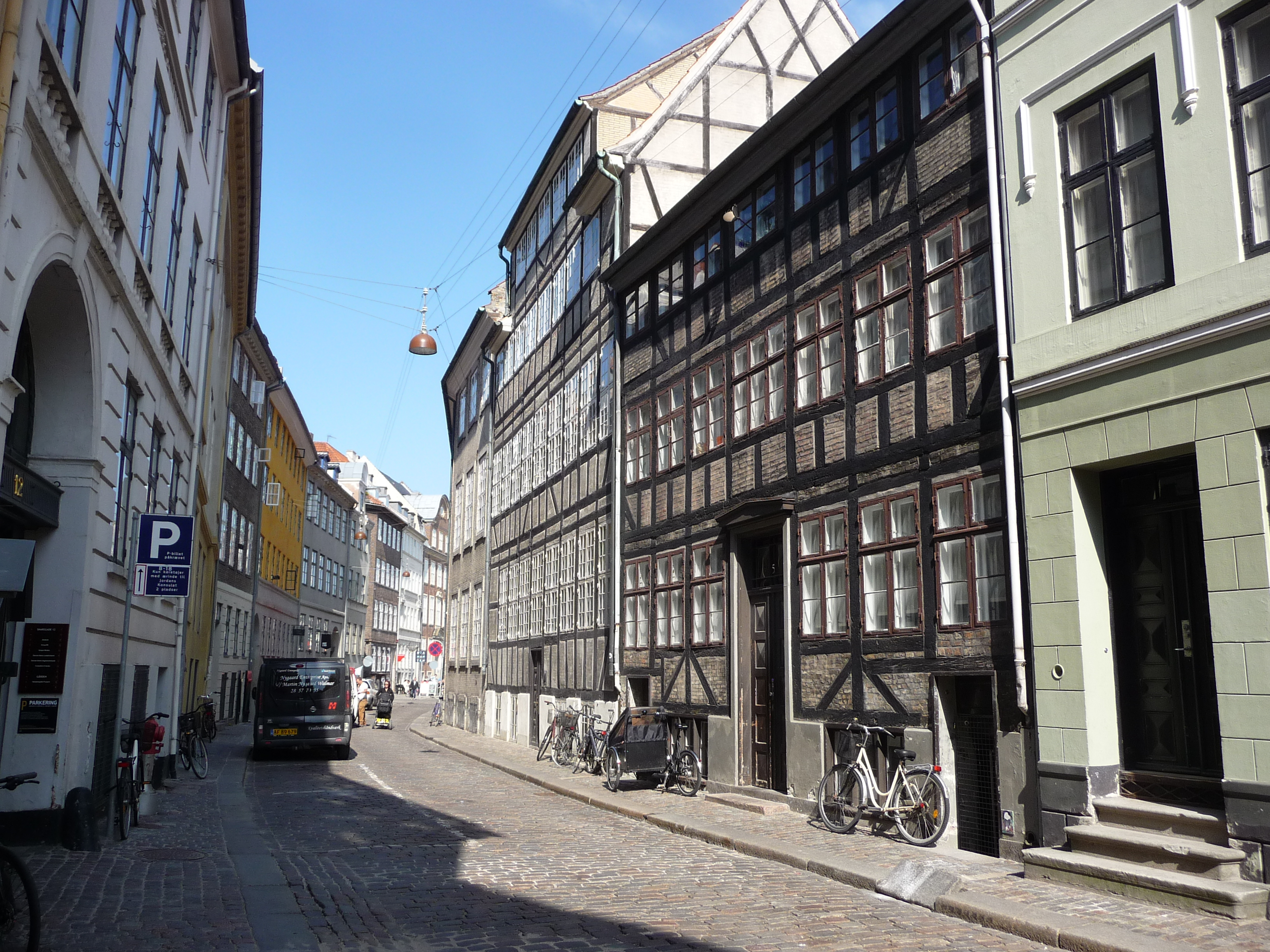
Snaregade Np. 5

The building on the corner of Gammel Strand and Snaregade is Assistenshuset, a former royal pawn shop now housing the Ministry of Culture. The building from 1730 was designed by Philip de Lange. The half-timbered house at No. 5 is from 1732 and was built for Jørgen Povelsen, a rope maker. It was extended with an extra floor in 1768. All the other houses in the street date from after the fire in 1795. No. 4 is from 1902 and was built by Jacob Laurids Thrane. No. 6 (1799) and No. 8 (1807) were built by Poul Egeroed. No. 10 is from 1808 and was built by Johan Martin Quist.

=== Magstræde ===
The oldest building in the street is the symmetrical house at No. 17-19 which dates from the 1640s. No. 20 also dates from the time before the fire of 1728. The Schäffer House (No 6), also called Hofsnedkerens Gård ("The Court Carpenter's House"), was built by Philip de Lange in 1733–34 for Court Carpenter Diderich Schäffer who had been called to Denmark to work on Christiansborg Palace. Schäffer's rich interior Rococo decorations from his house are now on display in the National Museum. It is five bays wide and has a three-bay central projection. The rounded pediment was added in 1850. Schäffer also owned Schæffergården at Jægersborg north of Copenhagen. No. 11 is a former warehouse from before 1797. It was extended with an extra floor in 1817. No. 13 was built as a brewery for Andreas Krogh in 1808–09.

== Cultural references ==
- In the 2015 drama film The Danish Girl, Einar (Eddie Redmayne) and Gerda (Alicia Vikander) are seen walking through Snaregade, arm in arm late at night.

== Image gallery ==
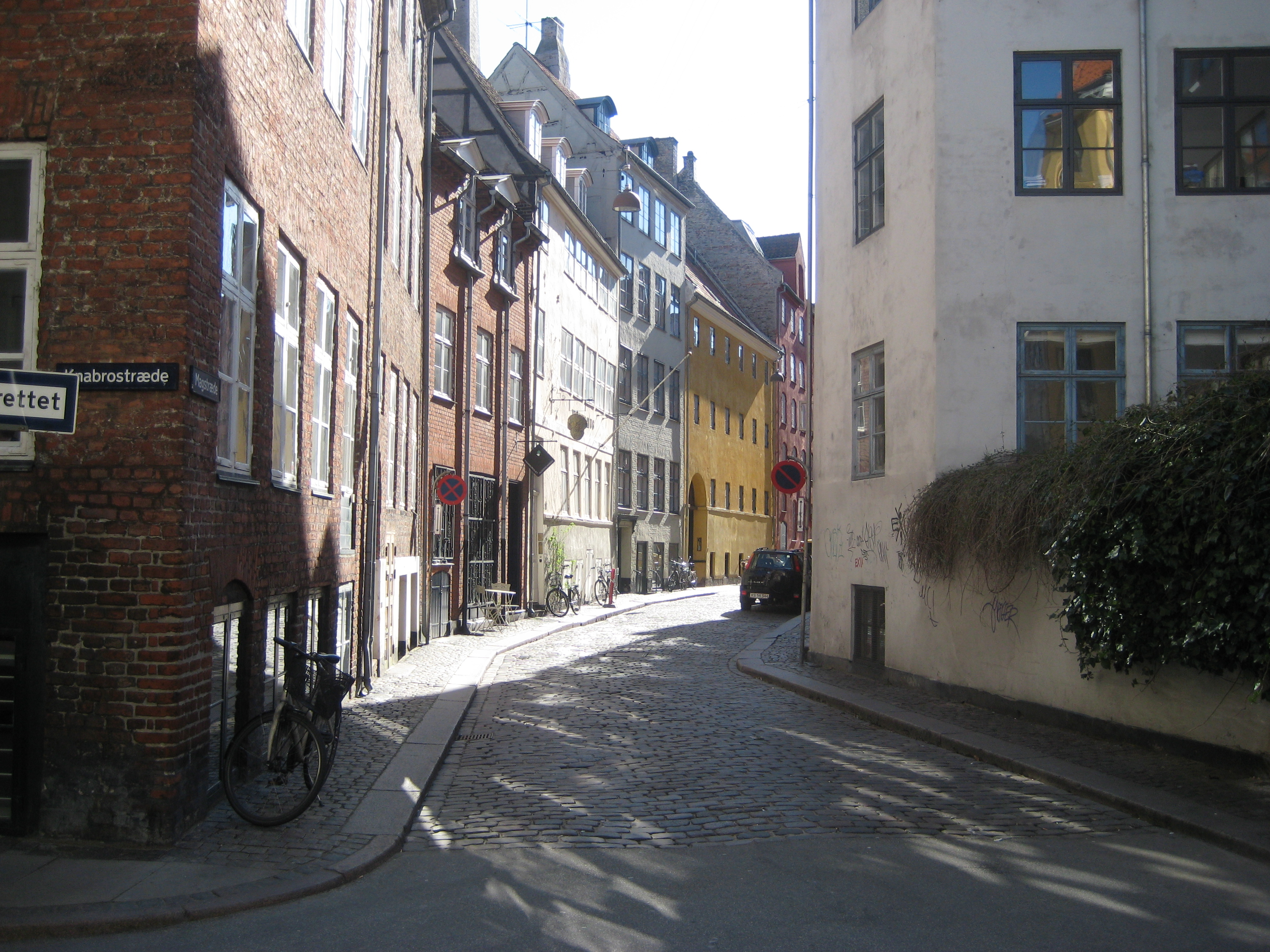
Magstræde viewed from Snaregade

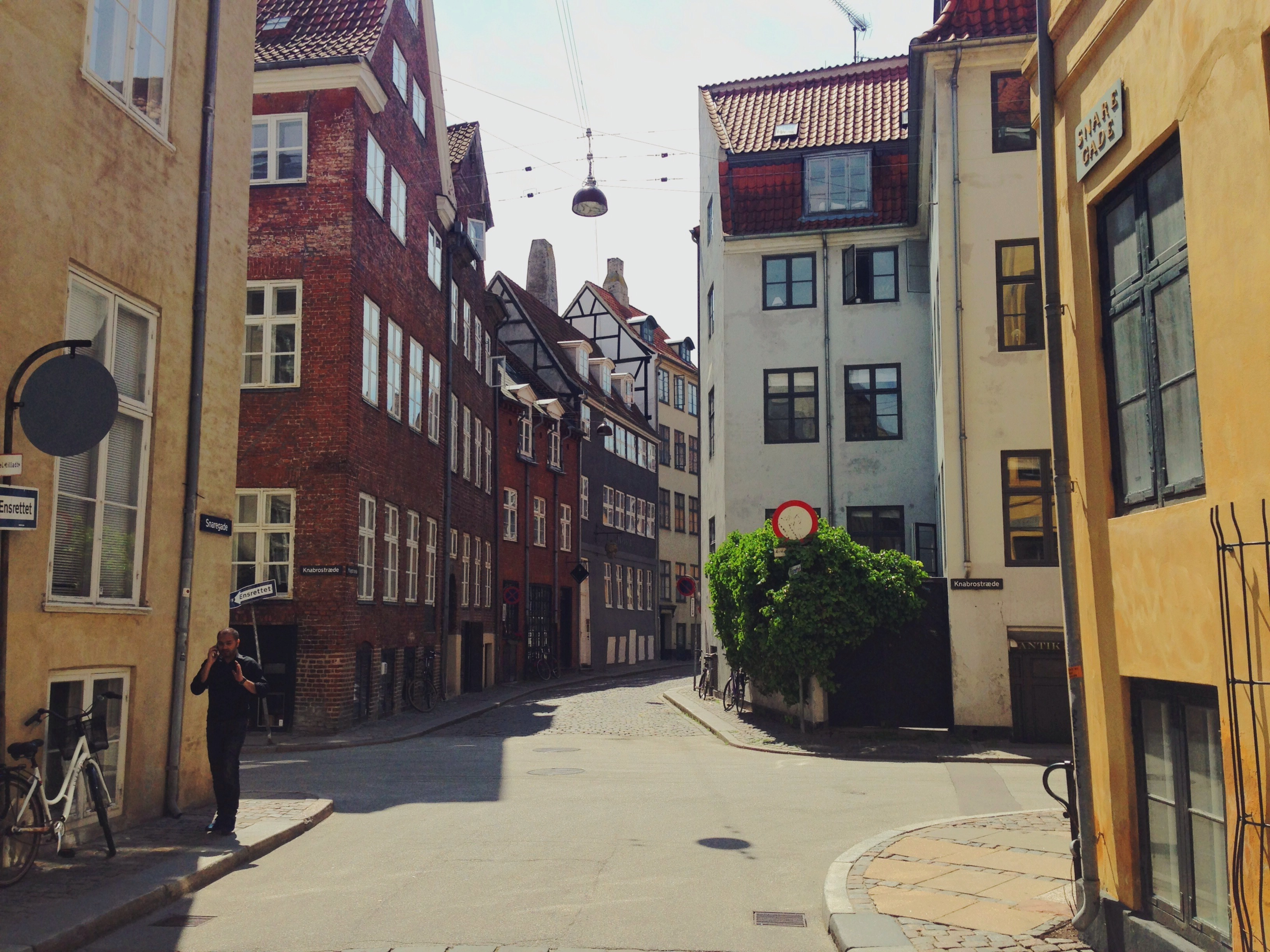
Magstræde

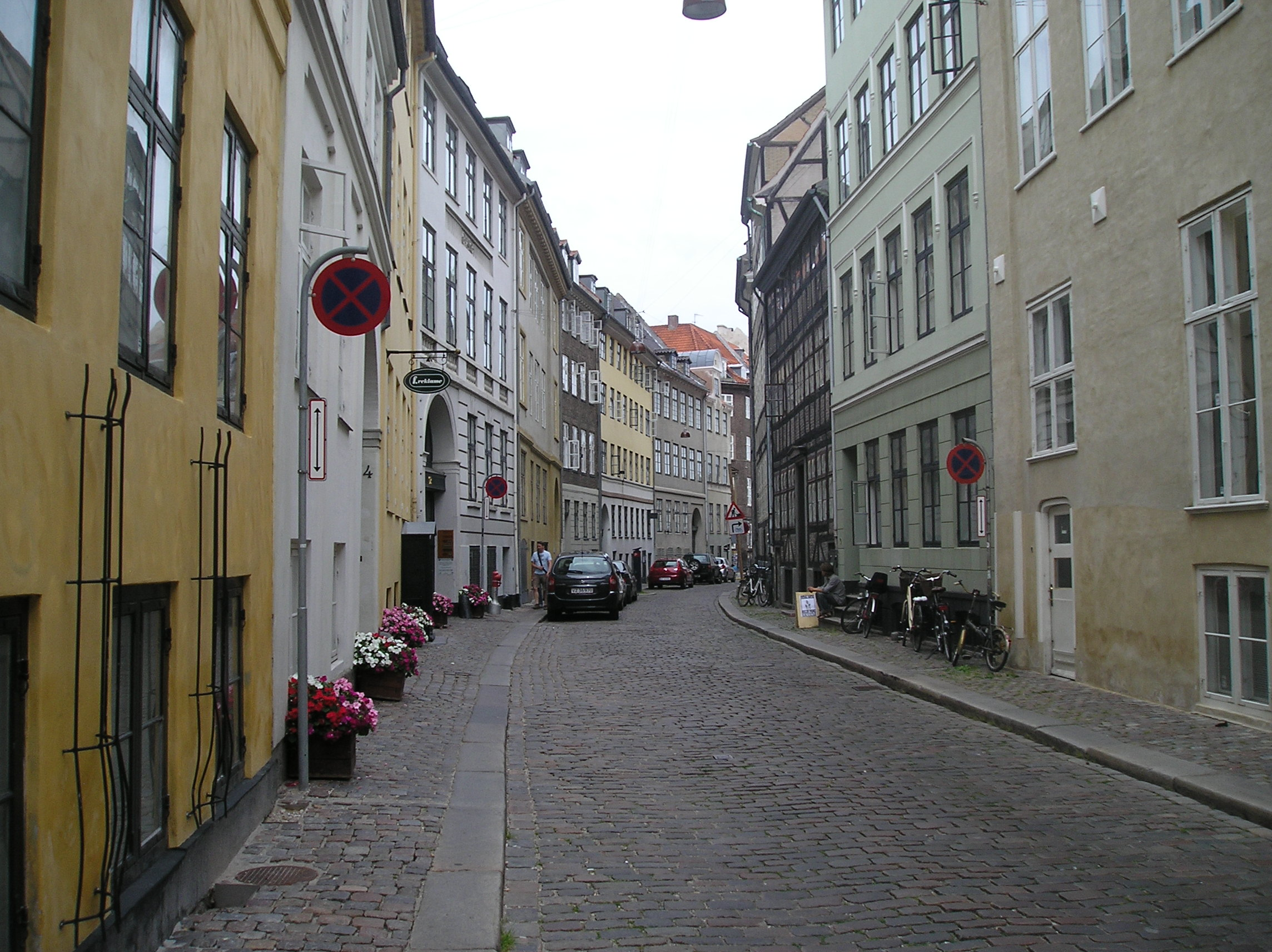
Snaregade

== See also ==
- Gorm's
