= Celine Parreñas Shimizu =

American filmmaker and author

- Born: December 28, 1969 (age 56); Philippines

Academic background
- Education: University of California, Berkeley; University of California, Los Angeles; Stanford University

Academic work
- Institutions: University of California, Santa Barbara; San Francisco State University; University of California, Santa Cruz
- Main interests: Filmmaker and film scholar
- Notable works: Straitjacket Sexualities: Unbinding Asian American Manhoods in the Movies
- Website: http://www.celineshimizu.com/

Celine Parreñas Shimizu (born December 28, 1969) is a Philippine-born American filmmaker and film scholar who is the dean of the School of Theatre, Film, and Television at the University of California, Los Angeles. She is well known for her work on race, sexuality and representations. Previously, she was the dean of the Arts Division at the University of California, Santa Cruz.

== Background ==
Shimizu is the daughter of political refugees from the Philippines. Her family relocated to Boston when she was in her early teens. She attended the University of California at Berkeley and earned a B.A. in Ethnic Studies in 1992. She holds an M.F.A. in Film Directing and Production from the University of California, Los Angeles and a Ph.D. from Stanford University in Modern Thought and Literature. She is married to Daniel P. Shimizu, with whom she has two sons. She is a grieving mother, having lost her youngest son, Lakas, in 2013. He succumbed to a common virus that attacked his heart within 24 hours.

== Career ==
Shimizu is dean of the Arts Division at the University of California, Santa Cruz. She was professor of cinema studies and director of the School of Cinema at San Francisco State University and for fifteen years, was professor of film and performance studies in the Asian American, Comparative Literature, Feminist, and Film and Media Studies Departments at the University of California, Santa Barbara.

Her sole-authored books include The Proximity of Other Skins: Ethical Intimacy in Global Cinemas (Oxford University Press, 2020), Straitjacket Sexualities: Unbinding Asian American Manhoods in the Movies The book examines transnational films and their representations of intimacy across radical inequality. The book studies scenes of cinematic intimacy in the forging of ethical manhoods on and off screen for Asian American men. Her first book The Hypersexuality of Race: Performing Asian/American Women on Screen and Scene won the Cultural Studies Book Award from the Association for Asian American Studies. In it, she analyzes hypersexual representations of Asian American women in various media including industry and independent film, pornography and feminist video. She edited the book The Feminist Porn Book: The Politics of Producing Pleasure along with Constance Penley, Mireille Miller-Young, and Tristan Taormino.

Shimizu's numerous publications include interviews and articles in the top journals in her fields including Cinema Journal, Concentric, Signs: Journal of Women in Culture and Society, Wide Angle, Theatre Journal, Yale Journal of Law and Feminism, Journal of Asian American Studies and Sexualities. She served as a columnist for the new media journal FLOWTV.org in 2009 and blogger on the They're All So Beautiful web series in 2013.

Her first feature film Birthright: Mothering Across Difference (2009) won the Best Feature Documentary at the Big Mini DV Festival. Her previous filmworks include Mahal Means Love and Expensive (1993), Her Uprooting Plants Her (1995), Super Flip (1997) and The Fact of Asian Women (2002/4), which won four festival awards. Her new film is The Celine Archive (2020), fiscally sponsored by Visual Communications in Los Angeles, is distributed by Women Make Movies and has won several festival awards.

She teaches popular culture, social theories of power and inequality, race and sexuality, feminist and film and performance theory as well as production.

For her scholarship and film work, Parreñas Shimizu received the Social Science Research Council Sexuality Research Fellowship, the Stanford Asian American Studies Graduate Academic Award, the Edie and Lew Wasserman Directing Fellowship at UCLA, the James Pendleton Foundation Directing Prize at UCLA and the Eisner Prize for Poetry—UC Berkeley's highest award in the creative arts. She has received external faculty fellowships from the United States Studies Centre at the University of Sydney and the Research Institute for Comparative Study in Race and Ethnicity at Stanford University.

While at the University of California at Berkeley, she founded "smell this", the magazine by and about women of color distributed by Third Woman Press and edited "Tea Leaves," the Asian American arts and literary magazine as well as the undergraduate journal "portfolio." At UCLA School of Theatre, Film and Television, she was founding president of the student body.

On a national level, she has served as a reviewer for the Ford Foundation Diversity Fellowships and the National Endowment for the Humanities' America's Media Makers Program. For Duke University Press, New York University Press, Oxford University Press, Rutgers University Press, Temple University Press, University of Michigan Press, and journals such as Signs, GLQ, and Frontiers she reviews articles and books.

She has served as associate editor for GLQ (Gay and Lesbian Quarterly), Women's International Forum (Elsevier), USA Editor for Asian Diasporas and Visual Cultures of the Americas (Brill) and is currently associate editor for GLQ (Duke University Press).

She has served on the Board of Crowded Fire Theater in San Francisco and currently serves on the board of SFFILM.

== Publications ==
=== Sole-authored books ===
- Shimizu, Celine Parreñas (2020). Proximity of other skins: ethical intimacy in global cinema. New York: Oxford University Press. ISBN 9780190865863.
- Shimizu, Celine Parreñas (2007). The hypersexuality of race: performing Asian/American women on screen and scene. Durham, North Carolina: Duke University Press. ISBN 9780822340331.
  - Winner, 2007 Cultural Studies Book Award, Association for Asian American Studies
- Shimizu, Celine Parreñas (2012). Straitjacket sexualities: unbinding Asian American manhoods in the movies. Stanford, CA: Stanford University Press. ISBN 9780804773010.

=== Edited books ===
- Shimizu, Celine Parreñas; J. Reid Miller; Richard T. Rodriguez (2018). The Unwatchability of whiteness: a new imperative of representation. New York: Brill.
- Shimizu, Celine Parreñas; Taormino, Tristan; Penley, Constance; Miller-Young, Mireille (2013). The feminist porn book: the politics of producing pleasure. New York, NY: Feminist Press at the City University of New York. ISBN 9781558618183.

=== Journal articles ===
- Shimizu, Celine Parreñas (Spring/Summer 1998). "The necessary terror of Stephen Winter's Chocolate Babies". Stanford Black Arts Quarterly.
- Shimizu, Celine Parreñas (October 1999). "Master-slave sex acts: Mandingo and the race/sex paradox". Wide Angle. 21 (4): 42–61. doi:10.1353/wan.2004.0005. S2CID 167940843.
- Shimizu, Celine Parreñas; Lee, Helen (Autumn 2004). "Sex acts: two meditations on race and sexuality". Signs: Journal of Women in Culture and Society. 30 (1): 1385–1402. doi:10.1086/421886. S2CID 143989595.
- Shimizu, Celine Parreñas (May 2005). "The bind of representation: performing and consuming hypersexuality in Miss Saigon". Theatre Journal. 57 (2): 247–265. doi:10.1353/tj.2005.0079. S2CID 144273954.
- Shimizu, Celine P. (2006). "Queens of anal, double, triple, and the gang bang: producing Asian/American feminism in pornography". Yale Journal of Law and Feminism. 18 (1): 235–276. Pdf.
- Shimizu, Celine Parreñas (April 2010). "Screening sexual slavery? Southeast Asian gonzo porn and US anti-trafficking law". Sexualities. 13 (2): 161–170. doi:10.1177/1363460709359230. S2CID 220395997.
- Shimizu, Celine Parreñas (June 2010). "Assembling Asian American men in pornography: shattering the self toward ethical manhoods". Journal of Asian American Studies. 13 (2): 163–189. doi:10.1353/jaas.0.0082. S2CID 144399937.
- Shimizu, Celine Parreñas (Fall 2010). "Intimate literacies: the ethics of teaching sexually explicit films". Films for the Feminist Classroom. 2 (2). (Formerly published as part of Signs: Journal of Women in Culture and Society.)
- Shimizu, Celine Parreñas (October 2012). "Asian American studies must be defended: subjugated knowledges in the age of new media". Journal of Asian American Studies. 15 (3): 342–346. doi:10.1353/jaas.2012.0021. S2CID 143877521.
- Shimizu, Celine Parreñas (March 2013). "Can the Subaltern sing, and in a power ballad? Arnel Pineda and Ramona Diaz's Don't Stop Believin': Everyman's Journey" (PDF). Concentric: Literary and Cultural Studies. 39 (1, Documenting Asia Pacific): 53–75.
- Shimizu, Celine Parreñas (January 2013). "Asian American Cinema (definition)". Oxford Bibliographies Online. doi:10.1093/obo/9780199791286-0080.

=== Digital humanities ===
- "The Vexing Power of Sex and the Face" in Prints of Pop (& War): A Mini-Retrospective of Roger Shimomura. NYU A/P/A Institute. May 2013.
- "Organic Asian American Sexualities" Theyreallsobeautiful.com A web series. April 2013.
- "Straitjacket Sex Screens" A column commissioned by FlowTV.org, University of Texas. September 2009.
- "The Hypersexual Power of the Hip Hop Hottie: The Black Eyed Peas' 'Bebot'" A column commissioned by FlowTV.org, University of Texas. July 2009
- "The Making of My Mothering Movie: On Race, Neoliberalism and Mothering" A column commissioned by FlowTV.org, University of Texas, June 2009.

=== Films ===
- Producer, director, Writer, The Celine Archive. (2020) Digital Film. 69 minutes. Premiere: Los Angeles Asian Pacific Film Festival 2020 (online). Theatrical Premiere: Harlem International Film Festival (2021). Awards: Grand Prize for Best Documentary Feature at Culver City Film Festival. Distribution: Women Make Movies.
- Producer, director, Writer and Co-Editor, Birthright: Mothering Across Difference. (2009) Digital Film. 75 minutes. World Premiere: ReelHeart Film Festival. Toronto, Canada. June 2009. Best Feature Documentary, Big Mini DV Film Festival, New York 2009. Distribution: Progressive Films (May 2009).
- Co-Producer, director, Writer and editor, The Fact of Asian Women (2002). Digital Film. 26 minutes. Experimental Documentary. The film evaluates the legacy of three generations of Asian American femme fatales in Hollywood. World Premiere: Silver Lake Film Festival, Los Angeles, CA. October 2002. Distribution: Third World Newsreel (Fall 2003)
- Producer, director, Writer and editor, Super Flip (1997) 16mm. 30 minutes. An experimental narrative based on interviews with Filipino American low-wage workers in San Francisco regarding work and love. Considered an "underground" classic of Filipino American cinema. World Premiere: Pacific Film Archive, Berkeley Distribution: Progressive Films, Berkeley.
- Producer, director, Writer and editor, Her Uprooting Plants Her (1995) An experimental narrative based on interviews with Filipino immigrant families regarding home, memory and exile. World Premiere: Women in the Director's Chair, Chicago. Distribution: New York: Third World Newsreel.
- Producer, director, Writer and editor, Mahal Means Love and Expensive (1993). An experimental narrative based on interviews with young Filipina women regarding race, colonialism, sex and love. World Premiere: Women in the Director's Chair, Chicago.

== Awards, prizes and distribution ==
- For The Hypersexuality of Race: Winner, 2007 Cultural Studies Book Award, Association for Asian American Studies
- For Super Flip: Motion Picture Association of America Directing Award; Edie and Lew Wasserman Directing Fellowship, 1995–96. World Premiere: Pacific Film Archive, 1996.
