= April Flores =

American pornographic actress

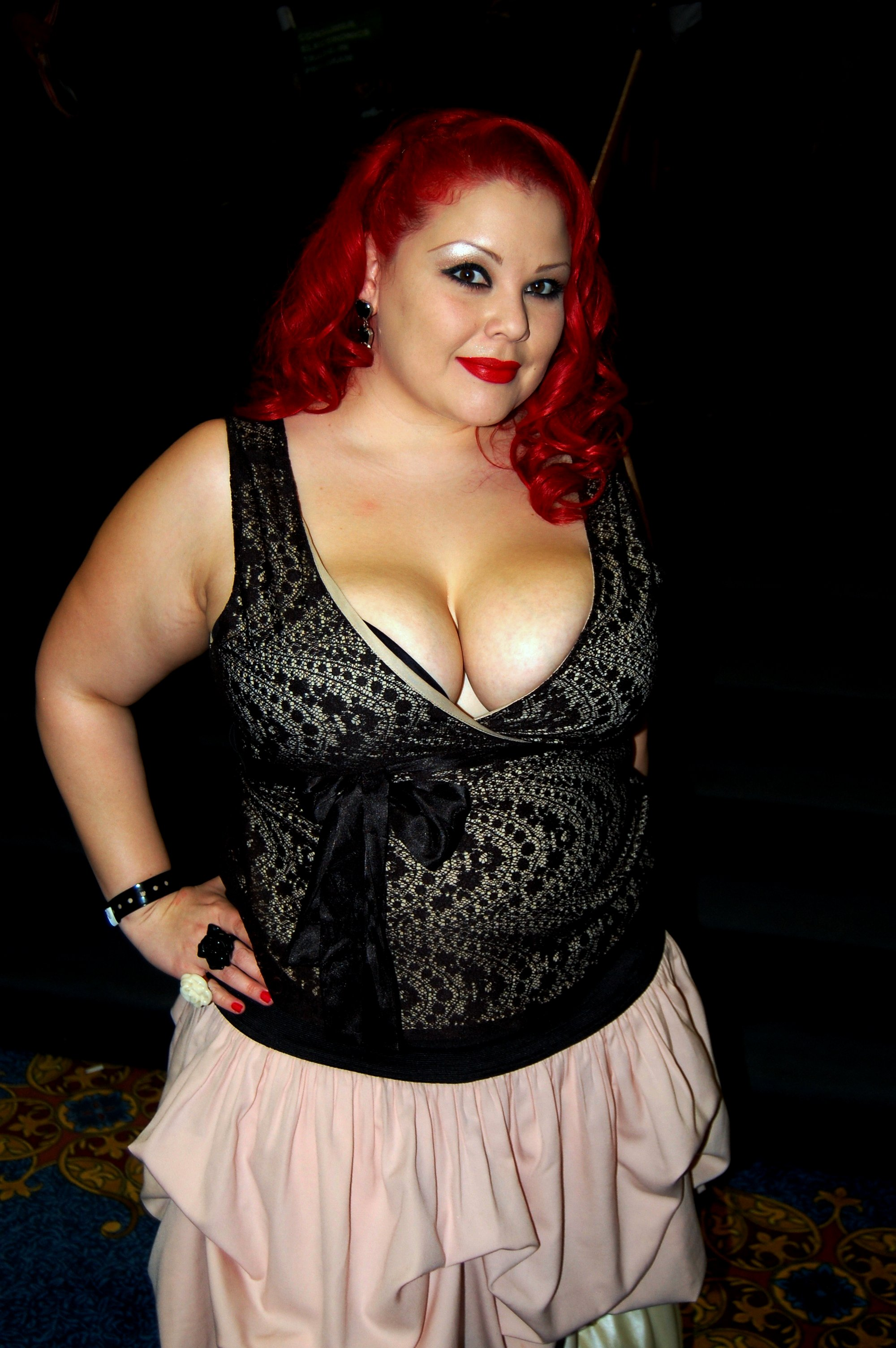
- Flores at the AVN Adult Entertainment Expo in 2009
- Born: Los Angeles County, California, U.S.
- Other name: Fatty D
- Occupations: Pornographic actress; director; writer; photographer; makeup artist; plus-size model
- Height: 5 ft 2 in (1.57 m)
- Spouse: Carlos Batts (m. 2003; died 2013)
- Website: fattyd.com

April Flores, also known as Fatty Delicious, or Fatty D, is an American pornographic actress and director, writer, photographer, makeup artist, and plus-size model.

== Early life ==
Flores stated to have come from a strict religious family. She is Ecuadorian from her father's side and Mexican from her mother's side, and she calls herself “Mexidorian”. When Flores was a child, she said she wanted to be a plastic surgeon simply because they made a lot of money. Flores struggled with weight issues since childhood and she thought she would be happier if she was thin. However, she abandoned the idea after losing weight in college and then concluding that life was “just the same” no matter her body size.

== Modeling and adult film career ==
Flores began her career doing pictorials for plus-size women's magazines like Bizarre, Juggs and Big Butt Magazine (the latter of which she appeared on the cover on two occasions).

In 2005, Flores was invited to perform with Belladonna. The film was April's first porn scene with a woman. Flores confessed that she wore a wig during the performance so that if anyone brought it up she could deny that "that was not [her]!" However, Flores enjoyed performing and was later invited to do more scenes.

April's father died in 2001, so she never came out to him. Flores admitted that she was scared to come out as a porn star to her mother. However, her mother was supportive of her career and became more supportive after Batts' death in 2013.

== Activism ==
Flores is supportive of her description as a BBW performer but chooses not to perform in traditional BBW porn, as she believes that it is derogatory towards its BBW performers. She instead chooses directors and performers that she feels will represent larger women in a desirable and positive light.

In a 2015 article with Cosmopolitan, Flores stated that she wants her work to show plus size women "that we are worthy of pleasure and desirability" and that she wants to reclaim the term "fat" to have a positive connotation instead of a negative one.

== Writing ==
In 2013, Flores co-authored and published a fine art book called Fat Girl with her husband just prior to his death. Published by Rare Bird Books, it represents a twelve-year collaboration the two as model and photographer. The book was Batts' fourth publication.

April Flores also contributed a chapter to The Feminist Porn Book: The Politics of Producing Pleasure. In her chapter, "Being Fatty D: Size, Beauty, and Embodiment in the Adult Industry," Flores talks about how she came into the porn industry and her work to portray big women as sexual and desirable.

== Personal life ==
Flores was married to Carlos Batts for 10 years until his death on October 22, 2013.

== Significance and other ventures ==
In 2009, sex toy company Topco released Voluptuous Pussy, a life-size inflatable doll named after Flores's vagina but modeled as an exact replica of her entire body. It is touted as “the first realistic plus-size sex toy”, and it is made out of Cyberskin material.

Flores was the first plus-sized porn star to be on the cover of AVN magazine.

April's website, Fat Girl Fantasies, launched in Spring of 2015. Her website honors her relationship with her late husband, but also depicts "fat women as sexual beings" and reveals their sexual fantasies.

== Awards and nominations ==
Year	Ceremony	Category	Work	Result
2010	FPA	Heartthrob of the Year	—N/a	Won
2011	AVN	Crossover Star of the Year	—N/a	Nominated
2012	BBW FanFest	Creative BBW of the Year	—N/a	Won
2013	BBW FanFest	Hall of Fame	—N/a	Won
2014	AVN	BBW Performer of the Year	—N/a	Won
2015	AVN	BBW Performer of the Year	—N/a	Won
2015	NightMoves	Best BBW Performer (Fan's Choice)	—N/a	Won
2016	AVN	BBW Performer of the Year	—N/a	Nominated
2021	BBW Awards	Humanitarian of the Year	—N/a	Won

== See also ==
- Jiz Lee
- Shine Louise Houston
- Queer Pornography
