= Pink and White Productions =

American pornographic production company

- Industry: Filmmaking
- Genre: Queer pornography, feminist pornography
- Founded: January 1, 2005
- Founder: Shine Louise Houston
- Headquarters: San Francisco, California, United States
- Area served: Worldwide
- Key people: Shine Louise Houston, Alexa Shae, Tristan Crane, Syd Blakovich, Jiz Lee
- Website: pinkwhite.biz

Pink and White Productions is an American independent pornographic production company, based in San Francisco, California, that focuses on explicit video web and DVD releases showcasing female and queer sexuality. The company's main director and producer is Shine Louise Houston. Houston began her vision for "Pink and White Productions" after graduating from San Francisco Art Institute with a Bachelors in Fine Art Film; her Crash Pad Series (CrashPadSeries.com), which has won many awards as well as being featured in Curve magazine. Along with her feature in Curve, Houston has also won Curve's Lesbian Sex Culture Curator Award, the Feminist Porn Awards "Visionary, " PorYes Europe's 1st Feminist Porn Awards Honored Filmmaker and International Ms. Leather Keynote Speaker.

Houston founded Pink & White Productions in 2005, aiming to create a sustainable adult entertainment company that exposes the complexities of queer sexual desire. Recognized internationally, Houston's projects include four feature films, regular DVD volume releases of her queer porn website crashpadseries.com, and her newest endeavor, HeavenlySpire.com.

Houston's work has garnered significant attention in LGBTQ and feminist communities, as indicated by with her many awards from the Feminist Porn Awards, started in 2006 and produced by Good For Her, a Toronto, Canada-based feminist sexuality education centre and sex store.

== History ==
The company's first release, The Crash Pad (2005), was directed by Houston. The film won the 2006 Feminist Porn Award for Hottest Dyke Sex Scene. The company's subsequent releases were Superfreak (2006), which won the 2007 Feminist Porn Award for Best Dyke Scene, and In Search of the Wild Kingdom (2007), a mockumentary which won the 2007 Feminist Porn Award for Best Trans Sex Scene, and CHAMPION: Love Hurts, which won the Feminist Porn Awards 2009 "Movie of the Year" and was nominated for the AVN Awards "Best Video Feature" in 2010.

The company founded PinkLabel.tv, a hub for work from independent pornographers with a focus on ethical porn. Pink and White Productions also operates a pornographic website called the Crash Pad Series that features video and photo updates of some of the performers and characters related to the DVD release The Crash Pad. Several DVDs have been released featuring content from the Crash Pad Series.

In 2011, the company launched a new pornographic website named Heavenly Spire, which features video updates of cisgender and transgender men. The website received honors at the 2011 Feminist Porn Awards.

In 2012, Crash Pad Series won the 2012 Feminist Porn Award for Best Website and in 2014 Occupied won an XBIZ Award for 'Feminist Porn Release of the Year.'

== Ethical porn ==
Pink and White Productions has built a reputation as an ethical porn company through its diversity of performers and scenes, and through its hiring practices and work environment. The company features performers of a variety of races, sizes, kinks, ages, appearances (e.g. tattoos and body hair), sexualities, (dis)abilities, and genders. Though the company explicitly seeks to showcase all forms of queer sex, its releases have had a focus on lesbian sexuality and a strong representation from the lesbian community. Most of the performers in the company's releases are cisgender women, trans women, and trans men, but performers of other genders have been featured, including non-binary people and cisgender men.

Pink and White Productions strives for transparent policy and informed consent for performers. The company's ethical production policies include providing resources for sexually transmitted infection testing and safer sex supplies, communicating with crew and cast about scene ideas and limits, paying the same rate for a shoot regardless of performer or type of sex, and including trigger warnings on scenes involving consensual non-consent.

== DVD releases ==
- The Crash Pad (2005)
- Superfreak (2006)
- The Wild Search (previously released as In Search of the Wild Kingdom; 2007)
- Crash Pad Series 1 (2007)
- Crash Pad Series 2: Unlocked (2008)
- Crash Pad Series 3: Through the Keyhole (2008)
- CHAMPION: Love Hurts (2008)
- Crash Pad Series 4: Rope Burn (2009)
- Crash Pad Series 5: Through the Revolving Door (2010)
- Crash Pad Series 6: Wide Open (2011)

== See also ==
- List of companies headquartered in San Francisco
- List of gay pornographic movie studios
- Feminist pornography
- Women's pornography
- Queer pornography
- Lesbian pornography
