= Émilie Jouvet =

French photographer and filmmaker (born 1976)

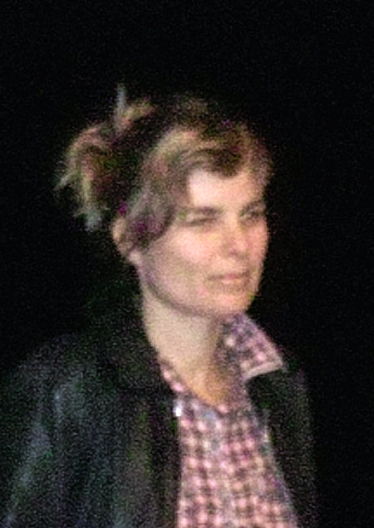
Émilie Jouvet en 2011.

Émilie Jouvet.

Émilie Jouvet (French: [emili ʒuvɛ]; born 29 July 1976) is a French filmmaker, photographer and contemporary artist.

== Biography ==
In 2006 she directed her first feature, a post-porn and feminist pro-gender queer lesbian and transgender film, One Night Stand.

In 2009 she assembled an ephemeral troupe of performers, consisting of Wendy Delorme, Judy Minx, DJ Metzgerei, Mad Kate, Sadie Lune and Madison Young, for a European tour during the shooting of her film Too Much Pussy! Feminist Sluts, A Queer X Show. This feminist sex-positive, documentary road movie came out in French cinemas in 2010.

Her first monograph of photographs, "Émilie Jouvet The Book", was published by Womart editions in 2014.

== Filmography ==
=== Short films ===
- 2013 : Safer, 3 min, Coproduction Yagg Inpes (Fr)
- 2013 : Candy Box 6 min, Coproduction Yagg Inpes (Fr)
- 2011 : Let it go 3 min.
- 2008 : The apple 6 min, Coproduction Émilie Jouvet, Judy Minx. Distribution Bildkraft (GER), PetraJoy (ENGL)
- 2008 : Kiss me 20 min.
- 2008 : Party time 4 min.
- 2008 : Memories 4 min 30 s.
- 2007 : Vicious 5 min.
- 2005 : Blind porn 3 min 30 s.
- 2004 : Roof 8 min 30 s.
- 2004 : Electric desire 3 min 20 s.
- 2004 : Blancx 3 min 30 s.
- 2003 : Kissing 4 min.
- 2003 : 'Mademoiselle 4 min 20 s.
- 2003 : Être une femme 3 min 45 s.

=== Feature films ===
- 2004 : Queerft : Queer Factory Tales (Les contes de Queer Factory) (segment "Blanc X") (segment "Electric Desire") (segment "Roof")
- 2006 : One Night Stand (Pour une nuit)
- 2010 : Too Much Pussy! Feminists Sluts in The Queer X Show
- 2011 : Fucking Different XXX (segment "New Kid on the Block")
- 2011 : Much More Pussy!
- 2011 : Histoire d'Ovidie, 55 min, French Lover Production (FR), Diffusion Canal plus (FR).

== Awards and nominations ==
- 2006 : First Prize, Porn Film Festival Berlin - One Night Stand
- 2007 : First Prize, Amsterdam Porn Film Festival - One Night Stand
- 2008 : Special Prize of the Jury, Copenhagen Gay and Lesbian Film Festival - One Night Stand
- 2009 : Sexiest Dyke Movie Price, Feminist Porn Awards, Toronto - One Night Stand
- 2009 : First Prize, International Best Short Film Competition, Madrid Film Fest - The Apple
- 2009 : Jury Award for Most Innovative Short Film, Seattle Lesbian and Gay Film Festival - The Apple
- 2010 : Prix One+One (Prix de la critique), Festival international du film de Belfort-Entrevues - TOO MUCH PUSSY ! Feminists Sluts in The Queer X Show
- 2010 : Prix spécial du jury, Porn Film Festival Berlin - Much More Pussy.
- 2011 : Audience Award Best Documentary, Reelout Queer Film Festival, Kingston, Canada - TOO MUCH PUSSY ! Feminists Sluts in The Queer X Show
- 2011 : Best LGBT film, Cannes Independent Film Festival - TOO MUCH PUSSY ! Feminists Sluts in The Queer X Show
- 2012 : Prix du festival PorYes Feminist Porn Awards Europe, Berlin - Much More Pussy.
