= Queer pornography =

Pornography focusing on queer themes

Queer pornography depicts performers with various gender identities and sexual orientations interacting and exploring genres of desire and pleasure in unique ways. These conveyed interactions distinctively seek to challenge the conventional modes of portraying and experiencing sexually explicit content. Scholar Ingrid Ryberg additionally includes two main objectives of queer pornography in her definition as "interrogating and troubling gender and sexual categories and aiming at sexual arousal."

Queer porn works to have authentic representations with respect to the sexual orientations, gender identities and desires of the performers in it. It differs from heterosexual, gay, or lesbian pornography, because queer porn will often be a partnering of performers outside traditional pornographic categories. Gay porn falls into a similar situation as heterosexual porn by putting an emphasis on androcentric imagery of pleasure, as scholar Richard Dyer argues, and often glorifies the homonormative, masculine body-type and behavior. To appear as inclusive, gay porn will exotify differences. Performers' bodies in queer pornography are key to providing a difference between it and other categories of pornography. For example, a DVD may have one scene which shows a transgender lesbian with a cisgender femme-identified queer woman, while the next scene may showcase two transgender queer-identified men.

The genre of queer pornography as defined above is relatively recent and has been popularized and distributed by adult film companies such as Pink and White Productions, Trouble Films, Real Queer Productions among others. While porn is not limited to adult cinema and can exist in the context of a variety of media such as queer written pornography, the currently produced queer porn is mostly in the form of video.

Some prominent queer producers include Shine Louise Houston, Chelsea Poe, and April Flores who attempt to challenge the filming methods within the porn industry. Typically within the Porn Industry, the producer and director have the majority of control over how each scene will be performed, who is showcased in each set, and creating a differential of performers’ salaries based on their popularity. Queer pornography counters these practices by actively engaging performers in the creations of scenes allowing them to form more organically as a collaboration with a more horizontal access of control rather than a hierarchically vertical system.

Queer porn similarly celebrates ejaculation but with some signification differences to conventional porn. Unlike in the mainstream industry, the performer does not have a financial bonus for providing such a "money shot." Directors only encourage performers to perform an orgasm if/when the actors feel like it. Since the money shot in conventional porn relies of visibility for the camera, it necessarily centers on showing external ejaculation of the penis as the ultimate climax. This reflects attention back to the male centered gaze and a representative instance of phallic power and pleasure. Queer porn attempts to broaden such a delineation of phallic centered climax and the pornographic production.

== Discourses on queer pornography ==
Queer pornography has been attracting academic attention since the 2000s. A challenge within queer pornography is that some labeled queer porn may depict scenarios that could be part of any heterosexual mainstream pornographic film. This follows academic Niels van Doorn's concept of the “pornoscript,” eroticizing heterosexual difference and focusing on the male subject position. For example, a scene from Real Queer Productions's Fluid depicts a threesome with elements of submissions and dominance, rough vaginal and anal penetration, and external male ejaculation. The film's adherence to the pornographic conventions is predictable and serialized. However, further inspection into queer porn that appears like heteronormative pornography reveals particular parody of serial strategy to expose gender construction within most conventional pornography. This process creates a queer version of the model of "subversive repetition" theorized by academic Judith Butler. Drawing particular attention to such a facet through imitation permits its productive act of deconstruction. Thus, queer pornography can disassemble the pornographic norm by mimicking it.

Additionally, queer pornography clearly reveals the imitative process of gender identification when introducing the figure of the transgender man. Compared to trans women depicted across other types of pornography, trans men appear significantly in feminist and queer pornography.

Films of queer pornography make "deviant" sexualities more visible by simultaneously starting a process of their normalization. So, in order to avoid creating a new kind of norm, queer pornography constantly works along the edge of the gender system. For example, when strap-on dildos made their appearance in queer pornography leaving viewers guessing whether they were faced with a "real" penis or a dildo, they soon became a common sight. While these strap-on dildos originally offered new ways of thinking about gender and sexuality, their ubiquitous use risked losing their subversive power.

As scholar Sarah Schaschek writes, “If heterosexual pornography accentuates clearly defined identity categories such as class, age, ethnicity, sexuality, or gender, queer films tend to reveal the high degree of stylization behind these identities”.

== Productions ==
- Dirty Diaries
- Pink and White Productions
- Real Queer Productions
- Trouble Films
- AORTA films

== Artists ==
- Dylan Ryan
- Jiz Lee
- Shine Louise Houston
- Buck Angel
- April Flores
- Bianca Stone
- Madison Young
- Tristan Taormino
- Erika Lust
- Petra Joy
