= In & Out (festival) =

LGBTQ film festival in France

Rencontres Cinématographiques In&Out // Nice Queer Film Festival
- Location: Nice, France
- Founded: 2009
- Founded by: Les Ouvreurs
- Language: International
- Website: http://www.lesouvreurs.fr

In&Out, originally called Rencontres Cinématographiques, was a queer (before 2011, lesbian and gay) film festival that took place every April in Nice and Cannes in France from 2009 to 2016. It was organized by the association Les Ouvreurs.

== History ==
=== The beginnings of In&Out ===
In 2008, the Rencontres Cinématographiques (Cinematographic Encounters) festival of gay and lesbian films was organized by Benoît Arnulf, under the aegis of a local LGBT association that he co-founded, in partnership with certain Nice cinemas. Around twenty films were presented at the festival, it drew the interest of nearly a thousand spectators. Directors Jacques Nolot, Céline Sciamma, and Alessandro Avelis were also in attendance and met with fans.

=== In&Out 2009: The first Rencontres ===
The success of 2008's Rencontres Cinématographiques incited Les Ouvreurs to organize an identical event the following year, under a new name In&Out. The first Rencontres In&Out took place from April 29 to May 5, 2009, in partnership with several cultural sites in Nice. Eclecticism reigned again in the programming, which proposed two retrospectives (of André Téchiné and of Olivier Ducastel & Jacques Martineau), a homage to film-maker poet Pier Paolo Pasolini, a Rocky Horror Show evening as lively in the audience as on the screen, and hitherto unreleased films (Otto; or Up With Dead People by Bruce LaBruce, Give Me Your Hand by Pascal-Alex Vincent, Les règles du Vatican by Alessandro Avellis). The critic Didier Roth-Bettoni attended to present his book, "L’homosexualité au cinema", and an exhibition of photographs celebrated the 30th anniversary of the Sisters of Perpetual Indulgence.

=== In&Out 2010: "Memory & Memoirs" ===
For its second edition, In&Out took place under its central theme of Memory & Memoirs with nearly 30 films screened. Two homages were made: the first to Magnus Hirschfeld, the Munich sexologist; and the second to the French writer Hervé Guibert, around a very moving and sincere oeuvre of words and images. Like each year, encounters with film-makers were organized – with Sébastien Lifshitz, Panos H. Koutras, Olivier Ducastel and Jacques Martineau, Louis Dupont, Jean-Gabriel Périot – broaching themes such as the "transgender question", the deportation of the "Pink Triangles", homosexuality in sport, and a focus on Greece. Previously unreleased films Ghosted by Monika Treut and El Nino Pez by Lucia Puenza opened and closed the festival and gave Lesbian cinema its due.

=== In&Out 2011 : "Intimacy" ===
The third Rencontres In&Out was held from April 19 to April 27, 2011 and was attended by 3,348 festival-goers. The theme for the 2011 festival was Intimacy, and the festival welcomed several film-makers who work in the light of this theme. Directors João Pedro Rodrigues (Two Drifters, To Die Like a Man and "O Fantasma"), Emilie Jouvet (Too Much Pussy!), and Vincent Dieutre (Ea2, 2e exercice d'admiration : Jean Eustache, Ea3, 3e exercice d’admiration : Jean Cocteau, My Winter Journey), gave their iconoclastic views on sexuality, desire and amorous passion. Once again, In&Out welcomed Céline Sciamma for Tomboy, her latest film, rewarded at the Berlin Festival, and Louis Dupont, who closed his great trilogy on the aesthetics of the body with Les garçons du Lido.

Audacity, eclecticism, and originality are as always in charge of the programming, two thirds of the 30 films shown at the festival were previously unreleased. This year the Festival paid homage to memory of gay and lesbian culture through the philosopher Michel Foucault, the writer Jean Genet, the German film-maker Werner Schroeter and the journalist and writer Jean Le Bitoux. There were also screenings of documentaries, with: Cuchillo de Palo by Renate Costa who reminds the viewers of the painful memory of Paraguay under the dictatorship of Stroessner; Beyond Gay, a reflection on Gay Pride Marches; or Miwa, A Japanese Icon by Pascal-Alex Vincent about Japan’s most popular actress of the 1960s. Several films presented at the festival might be called "disreputable", such as Killer Kondom by Martin Waltz or the latest two films with François Sagat: Homme au bain by Christophe Honoré, and L.A. Zombie" by Bruce LaBruce.

=== In&Out 2012 : "Gender trouble" ===
The fourth Rencontres In&Out began at Nice from April 24 to May 3, 2012 and concluded at Cannes on May 5, 2012. It was the first time the festival had been to Cannes. The festival was attended by 3,836 spectators. The theme for the 2012 festival was Gender trouble, and featured films and debates involving gender issues. The 2012 festival featured both veteran and newcomer filmmakers, directors, and writers including Coralie Prosper, Thomas Riera, Wendy Delorme, Emilie Jouvet, Chriss Lagg, Wieland Speck, Lionel Soukaz, Bérénice André, Bruce LaBruce, Vincent Dieutre, and Louis(e) de Ville.

=== In&Out 2013 : "Perspectives on Families(s)" ===
The fifth Recontres In&Out followed the format of the previous year and was at Nice from April 16 to 24, 2013 and concluded at Cannes on April 26 and 27, 2013. The theme for this year was Perspectives on Families(s), inspired by France's voting for the legalization of same-sex marriages.

=== In&Out 2014 : "Je t'aime, moi non plus" ===
The sixth In&Out festival took place from April 24 to May 3, 2014 at Nice, and concluded on May 3, 2014 at Cannes. The theme for this festival involved examining gender and sexual identities, homophobia, and the status of LGBT people in the wake of the legalization of same-sex marriage. The festival featured many guests including Abdellah Taia, João Pedro Rodrigues, Antony Hickling, Antonio Da Silva, João Rui Guerra Da Mata, Tina Fichter, Manuel Blanc, Randa Mirza, João Ferreira, Didier Roth-Bettoni, and Sebastiano Ayala Valva.

=== In&Out 2015 : "Coming out!" ===
The seventh In&Out festival was held in Nice and Cannes from April 30 to May 9, 2015. The theme and objective of the 2015 festival, according to artistic director Benoît Arnulf, was to allow gay and lesbian filmmakers an avenue to "come out" and display their works, to showcase them as part of their lives and careers, and help the genre gain appeal and acceptance. Thirty-three feature films and three short films were presented at the festival. Many of the featured films were from Eastern Europe, and the festival also featured a selection from Italy and Canada. For the first time, films competed for "Ampersand" prizes, going to the Best Feature Film, Best Documentary, and Best Short Film. There was also an Ampersand awarded by the jury, and one awarded by the audience. The jury, composed of film industry professionals and LGBT artists, was Didier Roth-Bettoni, Emilie Jouvet, Xavier Heraud, and Dana Osi.

=== In&Out 2016: "Twilight of the Idols" ===
The eighth In&Out festival took place from April 19 to 24, 2016 at Nice, April 26 and 27 at Beaulieu-sur-Mer and April 28 to 30 at Cannes.
