= Sabrina Chap =

American songwriter, cabaret performer, and author

- Born: December 9, 1977 (age 48); Elk Grove Village, Illinois, United States
- Website: http://sabrinachap.com/news/1/

Sabrina Chap (born December 9, 1977) is a Brooklyn-based songwriter, cabaret performer, and author. She was born and raised in Elk Grove Village, Illinois. She is the editor of the anthology Live Through This: On Creativity and Self-Destruction. She is most known for her involvement in the neo-burlesque and cabaret scenes as a musician and cabaret performer. Her two cds are Oompa! and We Are the Parade.

== Literary ==
Chap began performing slam poetry at Chicago's Ladyfest in 2000, leading her to perform in Ladyfest Amsterdam. The trip to Europe landed her in Paris's infamous Shakespeare and Company, where she lived for months in between touring in squats and cafes throughout Amsterdam, Luxembourg, Germany and Belgium. She was awarded a space and began working with members of Kilometer Zero, writing a short play for their 24-hour play series. During this time, Chap published 5 chapbooks of poetry, 1 chapbook of short stories and a one-act play, entitled ‘Security’, which was given a reading at Shakespeare and Company's first literary festival. Chap returned to Chicago to compete as a storm poet in the National Poetry Slam.

=== Cliterature ===
After performing in the Bay Area’s 2004 Ladyfest, curated by Tina Butcher (Madison Young), Chap was fascinated by the way in which artists in feminist communities supported each other. As a way of documenting how feminist writers work within communities, she began interviewing fellow participants in the Bay Area’s Ladyfest. Every author in the line-up curated by Young (besides Diane DiPrima) was interviewed and featured in a book length zine entitled Cliterature: 18 interviews with women writers’, which was later featured in the International Museum of Women.

=== Live Through This ===
Chap's second collection was the book, Live Through This: On Creativity and Self-Destruction (Seven Stories Press). In a collection of original stories, essays, artwork, and photography, Nan Goldin, Eileen Myles, bell hooks, and other cutting-edge artists explore their use of art to survive madness, abuse, incest, depression, and the impulse toward self-destruction manifest in eating disorders, cutting, addiction, and contemplation of suicide. The book confronts the brutality many women and girls encounter in the world around them, and takes as its subject the often misunderstood violence they at times inflict upon themselves.

The collection was nominated for a 2010 Lambda Literary Award for best anthology and was given rave reviews, primarily by the feminist press. "[Live Through This] posits a hopeful message: that while the quirks and sensitivities of a creative mind often seem predisposed to depression, they are also the exact qualities that provide a special set of tools with which to find a way through the darkest moments."

Artists included in the first edition were Nan Goldin, bell hooks, Kate Bornstein, Patricia Smith, Cristy Road, Carol Queen, Annie Sprinkle, Elizabeth Stephens, Carolyn Gage, Eileen Myles, Fly, Diane DiMassa, Bonfire Madigan, Inga Muscio, Toni Blackman, Nicole Blackman, Silas Howard, Daphne Gottlieb, and Stephanie Howell.

==== Second Edition ====
Seven Stories released a second edition of the book in 2012 which included the original essays, and additional material. A new introduction was written by Amanda Palmer and two new essays were added by Margaret Cho and Swoon. Also added to this edition was an artist resource list that included a glossary of additional artists to look to for inspiration and an updated mental health resource list.

==== Mental Health Advocacy ====
Chap has lectured and presented widely on the book nationally and abroad, including at the Brooklyn Museum, New York University, the Art Institute of Chicago and featuring on KEXP. She continues to tour speaking on the conversion of art and self-destruction and is currently represented by Soapbox, the non-profit feminist organization started by Jennifer Baumgardner and Amy Richards.

== Theatre ==
In the introduction to Live Through This, Chap comments on how hearing of playwright Sarah Kane’s death affected with her. “I was in rehearsals for one of my own plays when I heard of her death. I don’t remember exactly where I was at the time—probably in the theatre, making last minute additions to the text. What I do remember was the shift in me, the space slightly to the left of my heart that hurt when I heard it was suicide.” Kane's death was a great inspiration for Chap's future mental health advocacy.

This advocacy is evident in Chap's first full-length play, entitled perhaps merely quiet. Set inside a mental hospital, the play that focuses on the question of sanity, and how it is viewed differently by both the patients and the doctors. The play was later given a reading by the UK based theatrical troupe, the Icarus Theatre Collective. Other mounted plays include The Insatiable Lite Duet (Curious Theatre Branch, Chicago) and Security (Brooklyn Playwrights Collective, NY).

== Music ==
Trained as a pianist and composer, Chap began performing as a folk singer at Chicago's Burkhart's Underground. During this time, she played exclusively on guitar, although she had been playing piano since the age of five. After putting music aside for a series of literary and theatrical projects, she returned to it in 2010, producing her first full-length album, Oompa!.

=== Oompa! ===
Chap's first album, Oompa! was a ragtime-infused release. Oompa!, called “guaranteeably vaudevillian and undeniably impressive” by Go Magazine, quickly found its foothold in the burgeoning neo-burlesque and vaudeville scene, with performers using Chap's music in burlesque and cabaret shows nationwide.

=== We Are the Parade ===
Her second album, the riotous horn explosion We Are the Parade, positioned her as a new contemporary of the American standard. “Joyous!... [We Are the Parade] channels the raw energy of ragtime and an old-school musical, with lyrics that evoke a contemporary Cole Porter or Tom Lehrer.”

=== Burlesque/Cabaret ===
Chap has toured nationally and internationally as a cabaret chanteuse and raconteur. Noted for her live shows, where she mixes high theatricality with gut punches of truth, she has graced some of the biggest stages and the smallest barrooms a broad could find, including The Lowry (Manchester), Café de Paris (London), Theatre Bizarre (Detroit), Spiegeltent (NY, with Bindlestiff Cirkus) and more. “In her stage show she draws you in, disarms you with humour, and then makes you sit up and listen to what she has to say. The end result is intoxicating.” (Polari Magazine, UK) While performing in the neo-burlesque scene, Chap's songwriting became more satirical, with her most often being compared to Tom Lehrer.

=== Composer ===
As a composer, Chap was commissioned to score four silent films for New York City’s noted avant-garde film event, Cinema 16. She also performed original songs and incidental music for the theatrical piece File:Under, a series of short plays from award winning playwright, Bekah Brunstetter produced by the theatrical company SUPERWOLF. She regularly scores acts and is a featured performer with the infamous Bindlestiff Family Cirkus. Her song Never Been a Bad Girl was featured in the 2010 Sundance selection documentary, Too Much Pussy!

== Awards ==
- Sabrina Chap was the 2010 recipient of the Jerome Foundation Travel Grant/Award for Literature.
- Live Through This: On Creativity and Self-Destruction was a finalist for the Lambda Literary Award for anthology.
- Featured in the International Museum of Women

=== Publications ===
- Live Through This: On Creativity and Self-Destruction (2010)
- Live Through This: On Creativity and Self-Destruction 2nd edition (2012)
- My Baby Rides the Shortbus: The Unabashedly Human Experience of Raising Kids with Disabilities
- Adbusters
- Feministing – Interview with Diane DiMassa
- Cliterature – 18 Interviews with women* writers

=== CDs ===
- Live From the Burkhart Underground (2004)
- Oompa! (2010)
- We Are the Parade (2012)

=== Selected plays ===
- perhaps merely quiet
- the insatiable lite duet
- Security
- Hope Yelling

=== Documentaries ===
Her music was played in the Sundance selection Too Much Pussy, Feminist Sluts. (director Emilie Jouvet)

== Press ==
"Don't let the picture fool you – Sabrina Chap's forlorn album cover of Oompa! doesn't reflect what's inside: bouncing rhythms, complex instrumentation, and intelligent lyrics covering everything from heartache to performing femininity."- Bitch Magazine

". . .a knee slapping, bawdy good time."- The Killing Floor

"This album deserves more attention than it's getting, and Chap deserves to be a star."- Curve Magazine

"Oompa! is cabaret music, a sort of proto-lounge jazz that's best enjoyed in an intimate club, drink in hand and friends at your side...a very strong album."- Sepiachord

"I don’t offer these artists (Dresden Dolls, Jolie Holland, Squirrel Nut Zippers) up to slight Chap as derivative, but rather to put her in a larger context of artists. I believe Chap’s talents stand up on their own."- Feminist Music Geek
