= Jiz Lee =

American pornographic performer

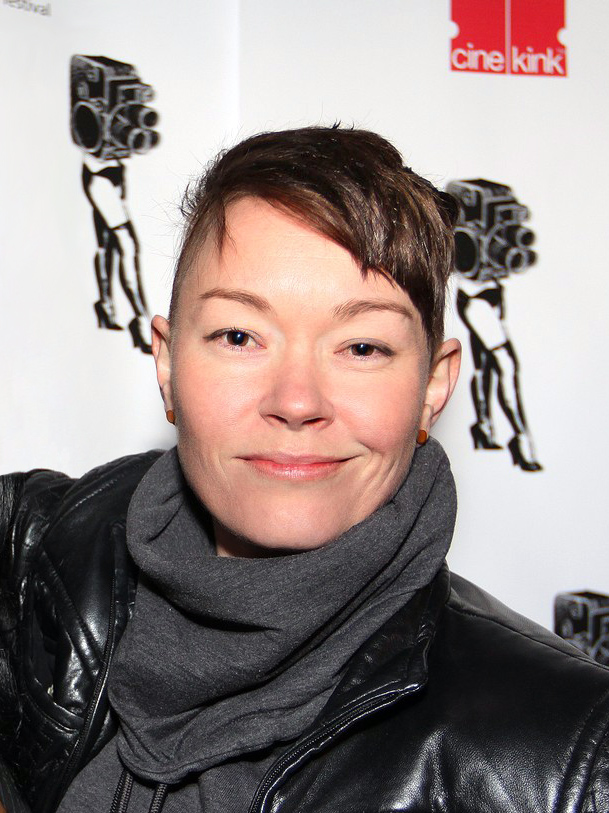
- Lee in 2013
- Born: October 30, 1980 (age 45)
- Occupation: Pornographic performer
- Website: http://www.jizlee.com

Jiz Lee (born October 30, 1980) is an American pornographic performer, considered a major star of queer porn. Lee is an advocate for the ethical production and consumption of pornography and for the labor rights and sexual autonomy of adult entertainment performers.

== Adult film career ==
Lee's first pornographic film was The Crash Pad for Pink and White Productions, released in 2005. Lee initially only performed with their personal lovers. Lee describes themselves as a "self-agent", only working with a director after meeting them in person first. Lee continued to work with Pink and White Productions founder Shine Louise Houston's feature 'SNAPSHOT'.

== Screen credits ==
In addition to their adult screen credits, Lee has appeared in numerous other queer and trans projects, including African American director Cheryl Dunye's queer romantic comedy of errors Mommy is Coming, in which Lee appears with an international cast that included the Black Boricua porn performer Papi Coxxx.

They had a recurring role as Pony, a dominatrix for the character Sarah Pfefferman, in the series Transparent.

They also performed the role of the genderfluid conjoined twins in video for The Residents's theatrical stage production of the album God in Three Persons premiered at MoMA in January 2020.

== Activism ==
Lee is known as an advocate of sex workers' rights, and is a self-described "pleasure activist". They have produced pornography under the name "Karma Pervs" to raise funds for reproductive and sexual health projects, support for LGBTQ people, and sex workers' rights. Lee is a significant figure in the genre of queer pornography, and is considered to be a visible genderqueer person in porn. Lee has stated that "there’s no such thing as 'feminist porn'", rejecting the implication that "all other porn is inherently misogynist".

Lee's growing popularity may be attributed in part to the growing quantity of production of feminist pornography and queer pornography. These genres of porn have grown significantly in marketing and consumption in the 21st century.

Lee is the editor of the 2016 book Coming Out Like a Porn Star, which compiles the stories of adult performers. The book was inspired by Lee's own struggles with "coming out" to their family about working in the adult entertainment industry. One review defined the book as "a lesson in social behavior and prejudice" directed at adult performers. Porn scholar Lynn Comella has described the book as "a testament to the power of storytelling and the importance of sex workers telling their stories in their own words." Lee has written on feminism and porn.

Lee has been interviewed in multiple articles on feminist, queer, and trans issues, especially on queer pornography. Lee has spoken at academic institutions, such as Stanford and UC Berkeley, on queer sexuality and their experiences in porn.

In 2011, Lee and fellow adult performer Courtney Trouble proclaimed October 21 as "International Fisting Day," which Lee described "a day of international celebration and education" intended in part to combat censorship.

== Personal life ==
Lee has identified as both queer and genderqueer as well as non-binary. Lee uses they/them pronouns. They are a graduate of Mills College.

== Awards and nominations ==
| Year | Ceremony | Category | Work | Result |
|---|---|---|---|---|
| 2010 | AVN | Best New Web Starlet | —N/a | Nominated |
| 2010 | FPA | The Boundary Breaker | —N/a | Won |
| 2012 | AVN | Best All-Girl Group Sex Scene | Taxi 2 (shared with Madison Young and Nic Switch) | Nominated |
| 2012 | AVN | Best Girl/Girl Sex Scene | Cherry 2 (shared with Andy San Dimas) | Nominated |
| 2014 | XBIZ | Best Scene - Non-Feature Release | Girl/Boy (shared with Manuel Ferrara) | Nominated |
| 2015 | AVN | Best Girl/Girl Sex Scene | Tombois 2 (shared with Sovereign Syre) | Nominated |

== Selected publications ==
- "Uncategorized: Genderqueer Identity and Performance in Independent and Mainstream Porn". In Taormino, Tristan; et al., eds. (2013). The Feminist Porn Book: The Politics of Producing Pleasure. Feminist Press at the City University of New York. pp. 273–278. ISBN 978-1-55861-818-3.
- "They came to see the [queer] porn star talk". Porn Studies. 2 (2–3): 272–274. 2015. doi:10.1080/23268743.2015.1059647. ISSN 2326-8743.
- With Rebecca Sullivan: "Porn and labour: the labour of porn studies". Porn Studies. 3 (2): 104–106. 2016. doi:10.1080/23268743.2016.1184474. ISSN 2326-8743.
- As editor: Coming Out Like a Porn Star: Essays on Pornography, Protection, and Privacy. Berkeley, Calif.: ThreeL Media. 2015. ISBN 978-0-9905-5716-6..
