= LGBTQ pornography =

LGBTQ pornography may refer to:

- Lesbian pornography
- Gay pornography
- Bisexual pornography
- Transgender pornography
- Queer pornography
