= Gay Meets Girl =

- Written by: Nicolaas Veul, Tim den Besten
- Directed by: Tim den Besten, Nicolaas Veul
- Starring: Tim den Besten; Nicolaas Veul
- Country of origin: Netherlands
- Original language: Dutch

Production
- Producer: Madeleine Somer
- Running time: 50min

Original release
- Release: 29 October 2013

Gay Meets Girl (Dutch: Een man weet niet wat hij mist; lit. A man does not know what he is missing) is a 2013 Dutch documentary film written, directed by and starring Tim den Besten and Nicolaas Veul. The documentary film explores the subject of sexual fluidity through a gay man's quest to have sex with a woman. The original Dutch title translates to "A man doesn't know what he's missing" and references a gay man's not knowing what he is missing out on by not having sex with women. The documentary aired on Dutch public television.

== Plot ==
Tim den Besten (age 26) and Nicolaas Veul (age 29) are documentary makers and friends. They both believe they are gay men, however they set out to test the boundaries of their sexualities. Tim is a lifelong gay man who has never had sex with a woman, but is persuaded to lose his heterosexual virginity. The filmmakers aim to explore whether or not "everyone is bisexual", as is the case in some animal species, as well as what the boundaries of gay male sexuality are. Tim wants to find out if his sexual orientation is as fixed as he believes it to be or if he might not be as gay as he thinks.

The documentary opens with Nicolaas interviewing Tim about the issues of homosexuality and sex with women. Nicolaas questions Tim, asking him what it means to be "gay" and what Tim's own "gayness" entails. Nicolaas asks Tim if he sleeps with women or has in the past. Nicolaas encourages Tim to experiment with his sexuality. Nicolaas relates to Tim that, while he identifies as gay, sleeping with women was surprisingly enjoyable and that trying sex with women helped him realize he was not as exclusively gay as he believed himself to be. Nicolaas tells Tim he wants him to have sex with a woman, causing Tim to decline the suggestion and claim he would never sleep with a woman. Nicolaas insists that Tim should sleep with a woman, engaging in a debate with Tim about the merits of sex with women, with Tim eventually agreeing and coming to the conclusion that gay men having sex with women is the correct thing to do. Tim further adds that he has no reason not to try it and that sleeping with a woman would give him a better understanding of his own sexuality. Nicolaas relates that after trying so hard to be gay, including coming out to parents and society as well as being involved in the gay community, it can be very difficult for a gay man to "go back" and start sleeping with women again, but that the stigma shouldn't deter gay men from heterosexual experimentation.

During the documentary, Tim and Nicolaas visit a sex coach to give them lessons on heterosexual intimacy and female sexuality and help prepare Tim. They also visit a bonobo habitat to learn about the bisexual behavior exhibited by bonobos. They visit with science journalist Asha ten Broeke, who offers her view that all human beings are bisexual. Tim arranges to meet a pornographic film actress in France who wants to have sex with an openly gay man. The porn actress, Judy Minx, tells Tim she has only had sex with straight men, but is enthusiastic about sex with a gay man in order to explore the boundaries of homosexuality and go beyond homosexuality's binary limitations. The film culminates with Tim losing his heterosexual virginity by having unsimulated sexual intercourse with Judy Minx, while Nicolaas films the sexual encounter. During their encounter, Tim tries vaginal sex, performs cunnilingus, and receives heterosexual fellatio for the first time. Afterwards, Tim high-fives Judy and gives the thumbs-up sign to Nicolaas, excited that he has just finished having his first straight sex. Nicolaas is smiling and asking how things went, while Tim explains to Nicolaas that the sex was excellent and he was surprised by how easy it was for him to perform. One month later Nicolaas interviewed Tim again, with Tim reiterating that he was glad he tried heterosexual sex and still considered it to have been a very enjoyable experience. However, Tim makes clear that his homosexuality has not been "cured" as he is still sexually and romantically attracted to men.

It was the goal of Tim and Nicolaas to reject the compartmentalization of human sexuality into the categories of "gay" or "straight" by exploring sexual fluidity and bi-curiosity. Tim believes the film was a success because he accomplished what he set out to do by answering whether a gay man could have satisfactory sex with a woman. The answer was "yes", because Tim was able to perform readily and enjoy the experience. Tim described his experience of sleeping with a woman by saying, "Can you be gay and still have satisfying sex with a girl? I did it and it was quite a revelation."

== Controversy ==
The film caused controversy in the Netherlands, with some denouncing the film as prurient or homophobic. Because the documentary was publicly financed by the Dutch television channel VPRO, some objected to the government paying a gay man to have sex with a woman. One Dutch newspaper headline read: "Gay wants sex with woman, using your taxpayer money." Other critics objected to showing unsimulated sex on television. VPRO received many angry letters from viewers, particularly gay men who felt the program encouraged a "gay cure". Tim defended the film, claiming it was not homophobic because he is gay and simply wanted to see if sex with a woman would be physically arousing. While some of Tim's friends criticized him as shameless, his parents were supportive of the film. In an interview with de Volkskrant magazine, Tim said he announced to his father, "Dad, I'm going to have sex with a girl" during a dinner party. Tim described this as a "second-coming out" and said that his father was supportive of his choice. In an interview with Dutch journalist Fleur Baxmeier, Tim said his parents attended the premier of the film, but sat in the hallway during the sex scene because they didn't want to watch their son having sex.

Reaction from the Dutch daily morning newspaper De Telegraaf was negative. The newspaper dismissed the program as a "sex dating show". The newspaper declared that "VPRO is looking for heterosexual girls for gay boys". Noting that Tim den Besten had made an appeal on the internet for a woman to take his heterosexual virginity, De Telegraaf wondered how many women would want to sign up for such a program.

In an interview with Nieuwe Revu, Dutch television presenter Rutger Castricum defended the documentary by saying that fears the film advocated a cure for homosexuality were nonsense and members of the gay community who complained about the film looked ridiculous.

Bram de Wijs, a gay drummer for the Dutch band Only Seven Left expressed concern with the film's "awkward and homophobic" and "nasty" premise, likening it to homophobic people who ask gay men how they can know they are gay if they haven't had sex with a woman and macho men who believe that lesbians need to find the right man. De Wijs denies den Besten's homosexuality, declaring him to be "not a bit" gay.

== Background ==
In an interview with HUMO magazine, Nicolaas Veul stated it was his idea for Tim den Besten to have sex with a woman on film. Nicolaas and Tim would often talk about sexual matters, but when Nicolaas asked Tim if he had ever had sex with a woman, Tim replied that he had no interest. From these conversations, Nicolaas developed the idea of Tim losing his heterosexual virginity and basing a film around the event that would explore the topics of bisexuality and sexual fluidity. At the outset, Nicolaas identified as a gay man but had dated and had sex with women in the past, and although Tim had dated a woman before, he identified as a gay man and had never slept with a woman. Tim was initially hesitant about losing his heterosexual virginity, but found himself increasingly aroused by Nicolaas's suggestion that he sleep with a woman, eventually deciding to go ahead with the project. Tim decided to sleep with a woman because he felt it important to challenge the Dutch taboo on sexual experimentation. While Tim still identifies as gay he has stated he is glad he slept with a woman and learned much from the experience, while Nicolaas has stated he found the effect of the project to be so interesting that it has motivated him to consider having sex with women again.

In an interview with de Volkskrant, Nicolaas stated that while Tim had always insisted he would never have sex with a woman, Nicolaas believed Tim was capable of enjoying heterosexual sex. Although Tim felt initial resistance to the concept, Nicolaas states that overcoming Tim's resistance and capturing the results on film was the purpose of the documentary. Nicolaas says he previously slept with a woman to prove he was a "real man", but wants to truly enjoy sex with women in the future.

In an interview with Nieuwe Revu, Tim den Besten recounted his sexual experience while filming the documentary. He thought he had to be softer and more careful when having sex with a woman. It wasn't until Judy told him to treat her like he would a man did he like it more. On his thoughts after the experience “I still don't like women, but it turned me on. Not in that super horny way you usually have, that you really want to eat someone, but more like: oh, that's how you can have sex”. When asks if he would do it again he said “ No, never again”.

== Cast ==
- Tim den Besten
- Nicolaas Veul
- Judy Minx

== See also ==
- Bi-curious
- Homoflexibility
- Sexual fluidity
