= Moustafa Bayoumi =

American writer, journalist, and professor

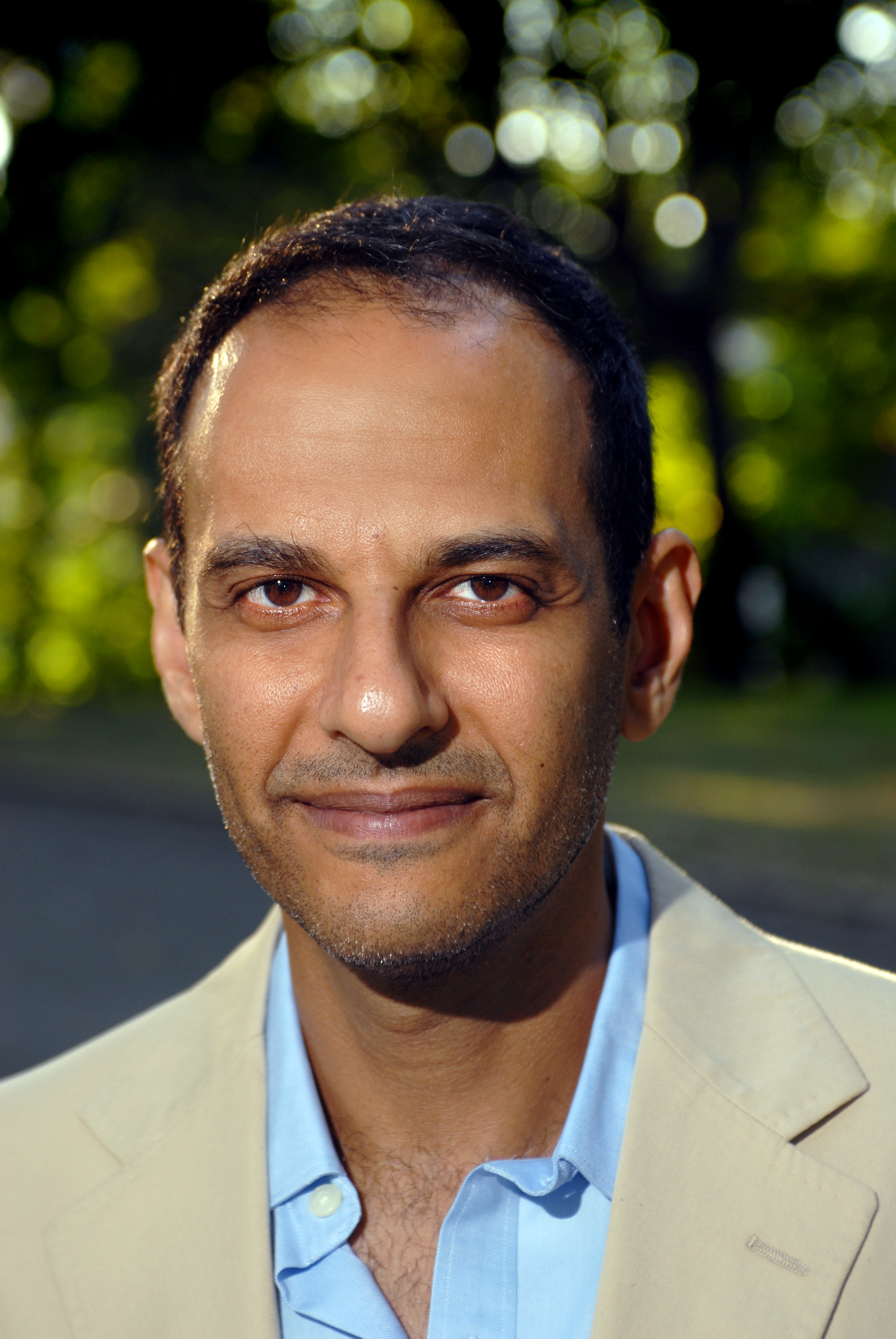
- Born: 1966 (age 59–60); Zürich, Switzerland
- Education: Columbia University (PhD)
- Occupations: Writer; journalist; professor
- Writing career
- Notable awards: American Book Award (2008); Arab American Book Award (2009)
- Website: moustafabayoumi.com

Moustafa Bayoumi (born 1966) is an Egyptian-American writer, journalist, and professor. Of Egyptian descent, Bayoumi is based in Brooklyn, New York. He is a professor of English at Brooklyn College, City University of New York.

== Early life and education ==
Moustafa Bayoumi was born in Zürich, Switzerland, and raised in Kingston, Ontario, Canada. Bayoumi completed his Ph.D. in English at Columbia University in 1998.

== Writings ==
He is co-editor with Andrew Rubin of The Edward Said Reader (Vintage Books, 2000) and editor of Midnight on the Mavi Marmara: The Attack on the Gaza Freedom Flotilla and How It Changed the Course of the Israeli/Palestine Conflict (OR Books, 2010). He has published academic essays in publications including Transition, the Yale Journal of Criticism, Amerasia Journal, Arab Studies Quarterly, and the Journal of Asian American Studies.

His writings have also appeared in The Nation, London Review of Books, and The Village Voice. His essay "Disco Inferno", originally published in The Nation, was included in Da Capo's Best Music Writing 2006 collection. From 2003 to 2006, he served on the National Council of the American Studies Association, and he was also an editor for Middle East Report. Since 2015, he has also been a regular contributor to The Guardian, mainly contributing opinion pieces.

Bayoumi's book, How Does It Feel to Be a Problem?: Being Young and Arab in America, traces the experiences of seven young Arab-Americans navigating life in a post–September 11 attacks environment, where public perceptions of the attacks gave birth to new stereotypes of Arabs and Muslims in the United States, fueling widespread anti-Arab racism. The title is a reference to the W. E. B. Du Bois 1903 essay collection The Souls of Black Folk. How Does It Feel to Be a Problem? was awarded a 2008 American Book Award and the 2009 Arab American Book Award for Non-Fiction.

In This Muslim American Life: Dispatches from the War on Terror (NYU Press, 2015), Bayoumi explores what the war on terror looks like from the perspective of Muslim Americans, highlighting the effect surveillance has had on their lives. The essays expose how contemporary politics, movies, novels, and media experts have produced a culture of fear and suspicion that erases the Muslim-American past and threatens civil liberties in the present. This Muslim American Life was awarded the 2016 Evelyn Shakir Non-Fiction Arab American Book Award.
