= Too Much Pussy! =

- Directed by: Émilie Jouvet
- Written by: Wendy Delorme
- Starring: Judy Minx
- Release date: 15 April 2010
- Countries: France; Germany
- Language: English

Too Much Pussy! is a 2010 French-German documentary film directed by Émilie Jouvet. It follows a group of performers who are all members of the sex-positive movement during the tour of their "Queer X Show" through Europe, from Berlin to Malmö. The group consists of the writer and actress Wendy Delorme, the DJ Metzgerei, the adult actress Judy Minx, the singer Mad Kate, the artist and performer Sadie Lune, and the adult actress and director Madison Young.

The film premiered at the Cinémarges Festival in Bordeaux in April 2010. In 2011, an uncensored version of the film was released, titled Much More Pussy!. It was defined as a "magnificent ode to women in all its forms (...) which is expected soon to become a cult".
