= Live Through This (book) =

Live Through This: On Creativity and Self-Destruction
- Language: English
- Published: 2008
- Publisher: Seven Stories Press
- Pages: 250
- ISBN: 9781609800123
- OCLC: 645940048

Live Through This: On Creativity and Self Destruction is a Lambda-nominated anthology that focuses on the balance of self-destructive and creative behaviors of women and trans artists. It is one of the few collections to include essays on a wide range of self-destructive behaviors, such as cutting, alcoholism, suicide, anorexia nervosa, eating disorders, abusive relationships and depression.

It was published by Seven Stories Press in 2008, with a second edition printing in 2010. The second edition included a new foreword by Amanda Palmer and additional essays by comedian Margaret Cho and visual artist Swoon. The anthology is edited by Sabrina Chap. Also included in the second edition is a resource list of additional women and trans authors for further reading.
