= Sexual stigma =

Form of social stigma

Sexual stigma is a form of social stigma against people who are perceived to be non-heterosexual because of their beliefs, identities or behaviors. Privileged individuals, or the majority group members, are the main contributors of placing sexual stigmas on individuals and their minority group. It is those who hold a higher status that determine within a society which groups are deemed unworthy of a higher status by labeling their specific actions or beliefs. Stereotypes are then produced which further the debilitating effects of the label(s) placed on group members with non-heterosexual beliefs or practices.

Todd D. Nelson mentions the perspective of structural sexual stigma, which is basically heterosexism. Using an adaptation of institutional racism, heterosexism describes the mechanisms by which sexual minority members are disadvantaged. Everyday interactions and exposures to stereotypes of a sexual minority group have become a growing incidence through institutional settings and social gatherings. The embedding of sexual stigma within societal practices has ultimately reinforced the occurrence of prejudice and discrimination against homosexuals and the heterosexuals who support them.

== Types of sexual stigma ==
There are several manifestations of sexual stigma. These have been identified as enacted sexual stigma, felt sexual stigma and internalized sexual stigma.

- Enacted sexual stigma involves an act of discrimination or violence towards members of a sexual minority group. This type of sexual stigma is not reserved for only members of the group but can be directed to the heterosexual family and friends of the individual or even towards those who allied themselves with the minority group. This is referred to as a courtesy stigma.
- Felt sexual stigma consists of the apprehensiveness that one might have of being labeled with a sexual stigma based on the views and stereotypes that society has placed on sexual minority members. This type of stigma is most likely to affect behavior because of the wide range of individuals that may be influenced by it. An individual may begin to avoid situations where a stigma could be enacted or by avoiding the majority group overall. Felt stigma can be a motivation to confirm a non-stigmatized status instead of possibly having their sexuality questioned.
- Internalized sexual stigma becomes a part of a person's self-identity as they begin to accept a sexual stigma they feel represents their belief system. Their self-concept supports the idea of a particular stigma that society has created through negative or offensive remarks or actions, which consequently creates negative attitudes toward their own personality and sexuality. In other words, the stigmatized individual begins to believe the negative views held against them, and begin to conform to common stereotypes.

== Research findings ==
The stigmatization of any group is found unpopular by most people who disagree with the treatment of others due to a personal trait they can not change. However, the following study looked into the effects of stigma and behavior and actually found that the chances of risk behavior could decrease with the presence of particular stigmas. Although the findings concluded that risk behavior correlated with stigma, it is not condoning the presence of sexual stigma within society. Deborah Preston and colleagues conducted a study that looked directly at homosexuality in rural communities and how stigma affected the outcome of sexual risk behavior. This study also focused on the increasing prevalence of HIV/AIDS in rural communities, which was considered the risk in behavior and the effects associated with it.

The focus of stigma ended up correlating with risk at the end of the study. It was found that self-esteem and family stigma was related to the level of sexual risk behavior. Men whose family was found tolerant of homosexuality were more likely to participate in modified high-risk behavior. However, men with families intolerant of homosexual ideas were less willing to take sexual risks in fear of the consequences his family members might encounter, such as becoming stigmatized themselves. This finding referred to as family stigma ultimately determined behavior in this particular study. Preston's article concludes that perhaps stigma ultimately influences the behavior of minority members in order to avoid the negativity that has been associated with homosexuality in rural communities.

Stereotypes

Homosexual stereotypes claim gay men are more feminine in speech patterns, body language, and physical appearance. They are said to be more comfortable around women or other homosexuals.

Lesbian stereotypes claim that gay women are more masculine. They are labeled butch ( a female that looks and acts like a male). They are stereotyped as having short hair and dressing masculine. Their body language is similar to a heterosexual males. They are associated with being more comfortable around men or other homosexuals. Their mates are to be considered lipstick lesbians or the more feminine of the two partners. Transvestites are frequently mislabeled as homosexual. Transvestites or "cross-dressers" are less identifiable of their sexual preferences due to their discretion.

Gender biased stigmatization

Historically, gay men have been the focus of most negative attributions. Lesbianism has been more discreet in the Western world. Gay was the label used to describe homosexuality. The "coming out" of women created labels. Homosexual became the male gender specific label and lesbian became the female gender specific label. It is suggested that because of the discretion of lesbianism, the dominating negative attitude developed and continues with gay men. Studies have indicated that heterosexual males have stronger negative attitudes towards homosexuality than heterosexual females. These attitudes are measured by the societal roles of both genders. Heterosexual females are less likely to be threatened in their role with a greater acceptance of same sex orientation. Heterosexual males have more societal pressure which contributes to ambiguity and a harsher negative attitude towards homosexuality. The attitudes of same sex orientation seemed much more positive with college students. The age of the participants did change the results of the views on homosexuality.

A study of responses after viewing gay images resulted that heterosexual men were more negative towards homosexuality than women. The responses of heterosexual women's attitudes were similar for both gay men and women and equally moderate. Heterosexual men had little to no response with lesbian photos but extreme responses with homosexuals. Images of gay men caused heterosexual males to respond by showing signs of physical discomfort and overactive reflexes, this increased to rapid breathing when shown images of gay couples. These responses indicate heterosexual men were more comfortable with a gay man than with a couple "acting gay". This response information indicates that heterosexual males are more comfortable with homosexuals individually. They are not comfortable with the act of being gay. Heterosexual men see it as a lifestyle choice. This view on gay men and their choice is one characteristic of The Attribution-Value Model.

Research based on men who were told they tested poorly on a masculine knowledge based test reacted with greater negative attitudes or scapegoated homosexuality. Men who took a personality test and were told they had more feminine personality traits expressed extreme negative attitudes with homosexuals that displayed feminine characteristics and more tolerable of homosexuals that were identifiably more masculine.

Sexual stigma and discrimination

Homosexual adults are frequent targets of discrimination and violence. Homophobia is a range of negative attitudes attributed to homosexuals and homosexual behavior that often leads to prejudice, discrimination and hate. Homophobic individuals often separate themselves from other groups and form a group based on that individual hatred. Homosexual adults are frequent targets of discrimination and violence. Male violence occurs more often with homosexuals because of the lack of understanding and the fear of being considered one of "them". Male masculinity in society is a stereotype that is important to many males and homosexuality is the opposite of that. Hate crimes are violence towards a group that is viewed as not equal to or different than a more dominant group. This threat is fear activated. These crimes often end in extreme violence and cause the need for homosexual identity concealment. This concealment leads to psychological distress. This distress leads to psychological disorders and self-hatred.

Sexual stigma causes discrimination. Heteronormativity is the discrimination of any group other than a heterosexual group. It creates inequality in the workplace and in society. Mays and Cochran surveyed homosexuals in the workplace. Homosexuals are four times more likely to lose employment and earn 11-27% less than heterosexual men with similar qualifications.

Inequality and sexual stigma

The legal issue of same sex unions may be attributed to sexual stigmatization. Marriage gives legal recognition of partnership and rights to resources and protections. Survey data indicates that large numbers of lesbian, gay, and bisexual Americans want to marry if given opportunity and many have done so, including those registered in domestic partnership or civil unions. Civil unions and domestic partnerships are huge advancements but are undermining to marriage. Same-sex marriage in the United States was not recognized federally until June 2013. The stigma remains among some that same sex orientation is a psychological condition. The DSM-IV does not support this.

== See also ==
- Homosexuality
- Gregory Herek
- Sexual prejudice
- Sexual orientation hypothesis
