= Midnight on the Mavi Marmara =

2010 book by Moustafa Bayoumi

- Editor: Moustafa Bayoumi
- Publisher: Haymarket Books
- Publication date: 2010

Midnight on the Mavi Marmara is a book from 2010 edited by Moustafa Bayoumi. It was written after the Israeli attack on the Mavi Marmara. The book includes contributions by Noam Chomsky, Stephen Kinzer, Alice Walker and Stephen M. Walt.

Reviews of the book have appeared in the Seattle Post-Intelligencer, Foreign Policy In Focus, Mother Jones, The New York Times Magazine, and the International Socialist Review.
