= Les travailleu(r)ses du sexe =

2009 Belgian-French documentary film

- Directed by: Jean-Michel Carré
- Starring: Judy Minx
- Cinematography: Jean-Michel Carré
- Music by: Benoît Jarlan
- Release date: 2009
- Countries: France; Belgium
- Language: French

Les travailleu(r)ses du sexe is a 2009 Belgian-French documentary film directed by Jean-Michel Carré and produced by France 2. It deals with the life of prostitutes and other people who works for the industry of sex.

It received mixed reviews. Le Parisien, even defining the film interesting, complained about the "lack of genuine cinematic appeal" of the film, "more suited to TV than to the big screen". L'Express wrote that if even it "remains too superficial on some topics (...) the real interest of his documentary is to be able to touch the depths of these stakeholders, an aspect rarely approached in this way on this subject".
