= Femina Potens Art Gallery =

- Established: 2001
- Dissolved: 2016
- Location: San Francisco, California, United States
- Type: art gallery
- Director: Madison Young
- Website: [no longer active]

Femina Potens (Latin: Powerful Woman) was a non-profit art gallery and performance art space active from 2001 to 2016, and located in San Francisco, California. It was founded in 2001 by artistic director Madison Young, which sought to bring greater visibility and advancement to female artists, including queer and transgender ones. The gallery highlighted feminist pornography, as well as sex work.

Notable artists that showed work at Femina Potens included Fakir Musafar, and Nancy Mizuno Elliott.

As of 2016, Femina Potens closed its gallery at the Market Street location in San Francisco; and the official website and social media pages are no longer active.

== See also ==
- Annie Sprinkle
- Midori (author)
