= Judy Minx =

French pornographic actress (born 1989)

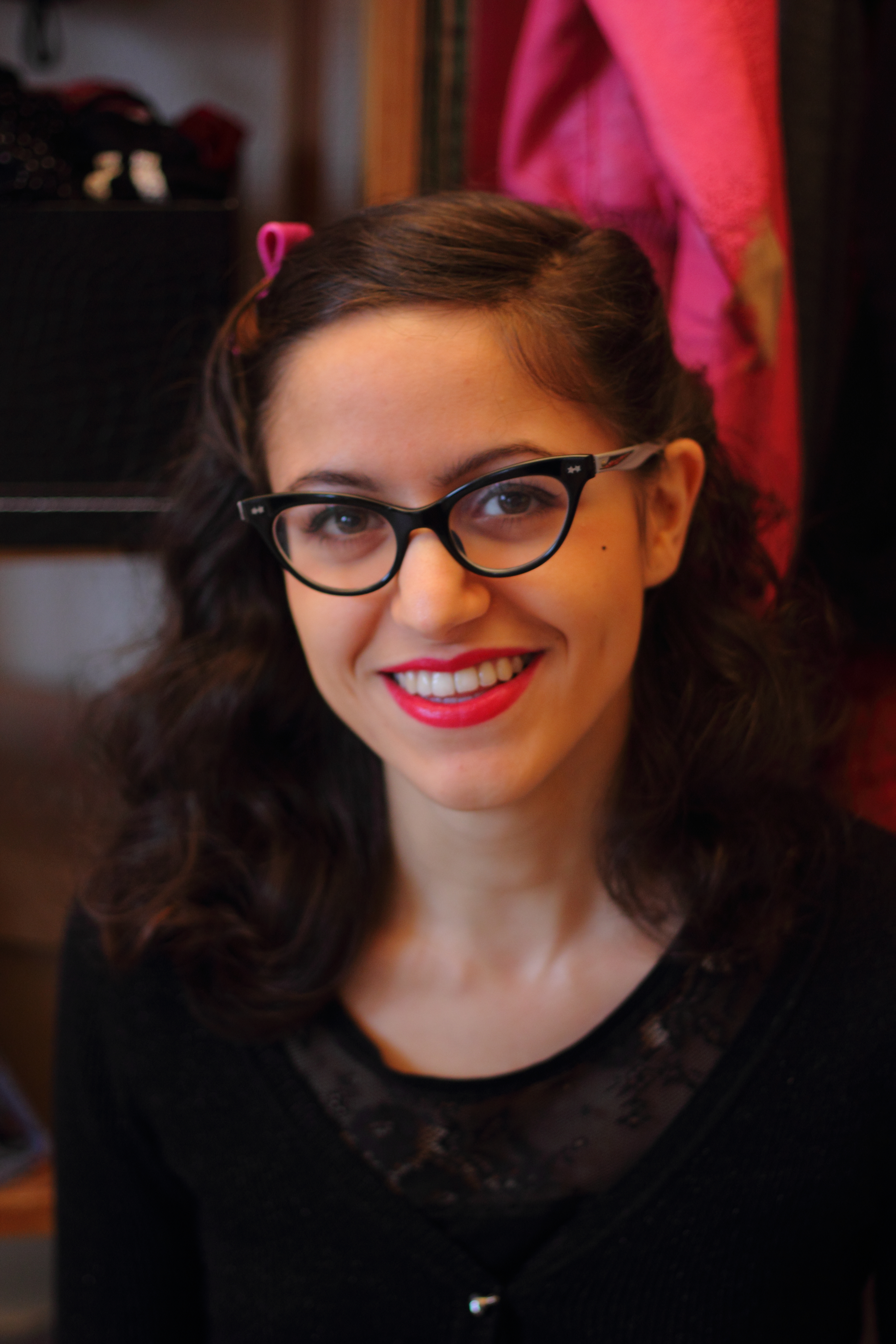
- Minx in December 2011
- Born: 4 January 1989 (age 37); Paris, France
- Website: imsoexcited.canalblog.com

Judy Minx (born 4 January 1989) is a French pornographic actress. She identifies as a sex worker, queer and as a feminist activist.

== Biography ==
Judy Minx was born in Paris and is of Tunisian and Algerian descent. She joined a feminist organization in 2005 when she was in high school. Right after she turned 18, in 2007, she became a pornographic actress in "mainstream straight porn". She also became involved with queer and feminist porn movements. Along with her pornography career, she continued her studies, and she holds a degree in English. Minx is an activist for sex workers' rights, and she is close to the French sex worker's trade union (STRASS). She has also given sex education workshops.

In 2009, she appeared in the documentary film Les travailleu(r)ses du sexe, directed by Jean-Michel Carré. In 2010, she starred the drama film The Final Girl by Todd Verow, which was defined as "a lesbian variation of Roman Polanski's The Tenant ". In 2011, she was one of the protagonists of Too Much Pussy!, a docudrama film directed by Emilie Jouvet that followed the journey through Europe (from Berlin to Malmö) of a group of six entertainers, all members the sex-positive movement. That same year, she starred in a segment of Fucking Different XXX, a German independent film consisting of eight episodes, each shot by a different director and set in a different city, that have gay/lesbian love as a main theme. In 2011, she appeared in the music video for the Ladytron song "White Elephant". In 2012, she appeared in the independent comedy film Mommy Is Coming, directed by Cheryl Dunye. In 2013 she appeared on the Dutch documentary Gay Meets Girl where she has sex with a gay man on film in order to help him lose his heterosexual virginity.

== Partial filmography ==
- Een man weet niet wat hij mist (2013)
- Mommy is Coming (2012)
- Fucking Different XXX (2011)
- Much More Pussy (2011)
- Roulette Toronto (2010)
- Too Much Pussy! Feminist Sluts, a Queer X Show (2010)
- The Final Girl (2010)
- Histoires de sexes (2010)
- Les travailleu(r)ses du sexe (2010)
- Roulette Berlin (2009)
- Ti'touch II (2008)
