= Jean-Michel Carré =

French director of television documentaries (born 1948)

- Born: 26 July 1948 (age 78); Paris, France
- Education: Institut des hautes études cinématographiques
- Occupations: Film director; cinematographer; producer; screenwriter

Jean-Michel Carré (born 26 July 1948) is a French director, cinematographer, producer, and screenwriter. Carré studied medicine before joining the film school IDHEC, where he obtained diplomas in directing and cinematography. He went on to found his own production company, Les Films Grain de Sable.

== Selected filmography ==
- Kursk: A Submarine in Troubled Waters (French: Le Koursk, un sous-marin en eaux troubles) (2004)
- The Putin System (French: Le Système Poutine, Russian: Система Путина) (2007)
- Les travailleu(r)ses du sexe (2009)
- China, The New Empire (2011)
- Les 18 du 57, Boulevard de Strasbourg (2014)
- Putin, the New Empire (2018)
- Chine, un miliion d'artistes (2018)
- Royal de Luxe (2018)
