= Mireille Miller-Young =

American academic

Mireille Miller-Young is an American academic who is an associate professor of feminist studies at the University of California, Santa Barbara. Her research explores race, gender, and sexuality in visual culture and sex industries in the United States. Miller-Young holds a PhD in American History from New York University. She describes herself as an "academic pornographer", a term originally adopted by Sander Gilman.

== Career ==
=== A Taste for Brown Sugar ===
Miller-Young's 2004 thesis, A Taste for Brown Sugar: Black Women in Pornography, examines the history of black women in pornography with ethnographic methods. The dissertation was published as a book in 2014, which was well-received. It has been described as a "must-read" building on the work of feminist scholars such as Angela Davis, Saidiya Hartman, and Celine Parreñas Shimizu.

In 2015, It won the National Women's Studies Association Sara A. Whaley Book Prize and American Studies Association John Hope Franklin Publication Prize.

=== Academics ===
Miller-Young is an associate professor of feminist studies and an affiliate professor in film and media studies, Black studies, history, and comparative literature at University of California, Santa Barbara. She was the Advancing Equity Through Research Fellow at the Hutchins Center for African and African American Research at Harvard University from 2019 to 2020 and a visiting fellow at the Institute for Cultural Inquiry in Berlin from 2020 to 2021.

Her current projects include the Black Erotic Archive project and the Sex Worker Oral History Project.

== Criminal case ==
In 2014, Miller-Young was charged with misdemeanor battery, grand theft, and vandalism for stealing a sign from a pair of teenage anti-abortion demonstrators on the University of California Santa Barbara campus, pushing them when they followed her, and destroying the sign. In her interview with police, Miller-Young said she had a "moral right" to remove the material from sight. She pleaded no contest and was sentenced to 108 hours of community service and three years of probation. She was also ordered to pay restitution and attend anger management classes.

The case attracted widespread attention. The UCSB Vice Chancellor for Student Affairs, Michael Young, published a letter on the incident that was interpreted as a rebuke to both sides involved in the altercation. More than 30 professors from universities across the nation signed a letter of support for Miller-Young.

== Selected publications ==
=== Books and book chapters ===
- With Penley, Constanze; Parreñas Shimizu, Celine; Taormino, Tristan, eds. (2013). The Feminist Porn Book: The Politics of Producing Pleasure. The Feminist Press at CUNY. ISBN 978-1-5586-1818-3.
- Miller-Young, Mireille (2014). A Taste for Brown Sugar: Black Women in Pornography. Duke University Press. doi:10.1515/9780822375913-001. ISBN 978-0-8223-5814-5.
- — (2007). "Let Me Tell Ya 'Bout Black Chicks: Interracial Desire and Black Women in 1980s Video Pornography". In Nikunen, Kaarina; Paasonen, Susanna; Saarenmaa, Laura (eds.). Pornification: Sex and Sexuality in Media Culture. Berg Publishers. ISBN 978-1-8452-0704-5.
- — (2007). "Sexy and Smart: Black Women and the Politics of Self-Authorship in Netporn". In Jacobs, Katrien; Jansen, Mariej; Pasquinelli, Matteo (eds.). C'Lick Me: A Netporn Studies Reader. Paradiso. ISBN 978-90-78146-03-2.

=== Articles ===
- Miller-Young, Mireille (2005). "Black Tale: Women of Color in the American Porn Industry". $pread. 1 (1).
- — (2005). "Hardcore desire". ColorLines. Winter 2005 − 2006 (3): 1–35.
- — (2007). "Hip-Hop Honeys and Da Hustlaz: Black Sexualities in the New Hip-Hop Pornography". Meridians: Feminism, Race, Transnationalism. 8 (1): 261–292. doi:10.2979/mer.2007.8.1.261.
- — (2010). "Putting Hypersexuality to Work: Black Women and Illicit Eroticism in Pornography". Sexualities. 13 (2): 219–235. doi:10.1177/1363460709359229. S2CID 143676229.

== Awards ==
- National Women's Studies Association Sarah A. Whaley Book Prizee, 2015
- American Studies Association John Hope Franklin Publication Prize, 2015
- Distinguished Teaching Award of the University of California, Santa Barbara, 2019
