= Tristan Taormino =

American author, educator and pornographic film director (born 1971)

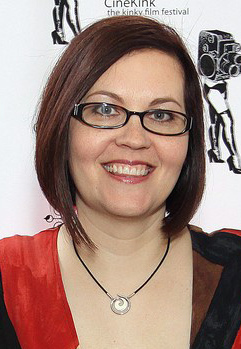
- Taormino in 2013
- Born: May 9, 1971 (age 55); Syosset, New York
- Occupations: Author; columnist; sex educator; speaker; radio host; pornographic film director
- Writing career
- Movement: Sex-positive feminism
- Website: www.tristantaormino.com

Tristan Taormino (born May 9, 1971) is an American feminist author, sex educator, and pornographic film director. She is most recently known for her book Opening Up: A Guide to Creating and Sustaining Open Relationships, which is often recommended as a starter guide to polyamory and non-monogamy.

== Early life ==
Taormino was born in Syosset, New York on May 9, 1971. She is the only child of Judith Bennett Pynchon and William J. Taormino. On her mother's side of the family, Taormino is a descendant of William Pynchon, an early English-American settler. She is also the niece of author Thomas Pynchon. Her parents divorced before she turned two years old. She was raised primarily by her mother on Long Island. She maintained a close relationship with her father Bill Taormino, who died of AIDS in 1995. Taormino attended Sayville High School on Long Island and was salutatorian of her graduating class. She graduated Phi Beta Kappa with a bachelor's degree in American Studies from Wesleyan University in 1993.

== Career ==
=== Books ===
Taormino is the author of eight books, including the Firecracker Alternative Book Award–winning The Ultimate Guide to Anal Sex for Women.

She has edited anthologies including the Lambda Literary Award–winning annual anthology series she created and edited from 1996 to 2009, Best Lesbian Erotica, published by Cleis Press.

Taormino edited one of the first trans erotica anthologies, Take Me There: Trans and Genderqueer Erotica, published in 2011 by Cleis Press. Nerve Endings, edited by Tobi Hill-Meyer, was another. Some of the authors included in Take Me There were Kate Bornstein, Patrick Califia, S. Bear Bergman, Ivan E. Coyote, Julia Serano, Laura Antoniou, Helen Boyd, Rachel Kramer Bussel, and Hill-Meyer. Taormino stated that she wanted to maximize the collection's diversity in portraying various stories and characters because there was so little erotica available that was written by and for trans people, especially trans women. Take Me There won the 2012 Lambda Literary Award for Transgender Fiction.

She was a regular columnist for The Village Voice from 1999 to 2008, where she wrote the bi-weekly sex column Pucker Up. In print, her column appeared opposite Dan Savage's column Savage Love. She popularized and re-defined the term "queer heterosexual," in her 1995 column The Queer Heterosexual. She wrote: "In some cases, it's based on either one or both partners having non-traditional gender expressions ... or they actively work against their assigned gender roles. Some queer heterosexuals are strongly aligned with queer community, culture, politics, and activism but happen to love and lust after people of a different gender. I also consider folks who embrace alternative models of sexuality and relationships (polyamory, non-monogamy, BDSM, cross-dressing) to be queer, since labeling them 'straight,' considering their lifestyle choices, seems inappropriate." She was laid off from The Village Voice in 2008. She has written The Anal Advisor column for Hustler's Taboo magazine since 1999, and she is a former columnist for Velvetpark. She is the former editor of On Our Backs, the US's oldest lesbian-produced lesbian sex magazine.

=== Lectures and controversy ===
Taormino has lectured at many colleges and universities, where she speaks on gay and lesbian issues, sexuality and gender, and feminism. Some of her college appearances have stirred controversy, as at University of North Carolina at Greensboro in 2004, Princeton, and, most famously, Oregon State University in 2011, where administrators un-invited her as keynote speaker at the Modern Sex Conference. There was a huge uproar on the internet, and many accused OSU of anti-sex bias. The incident received national media attention. Eventually, students raised the funds and re-invited her themselves.

=== Film and television ===
Taormino hosted the television show Sexology 101 on The Burly Bear Network in 2001, a college cable network owned by Lorne Michaels' Broadway Video. She was a regular expert and panelist on Ricki Lake for two seasons in 2002 and 2003. In 2003, she signed a development deal with MTV Networks. She served as host and executive producer on the pilot for The Naughty Show, but the series was never picked up. She has appeared as an expert on sex, relationships, feminism, pornography, non-monogamy, and LGBT issues on Melissa Harris-Perry, Joy Behar: Say Anything, HBO's Real Sex, The Howard Stern Show, Ricki Lake, MTV, and other television shows.

Taormino worked with Spike Lee as a script consultant and with the cast on the set of his 2004 movie She Hate Me. In 2006, she appeared as a so-called "sextra" in John Cameron Mitchell's film, Shortbus, participating in an unsimulated orgy that was filmed for the movie. (Her presence is confirmed by the director on the DVD commentary.) She also appeared in Becky Goldberg's 2003 documentary Hot and Bothered: Feminist Pornography and in Mr. Angel, the documentary about Buck Angel (2013).

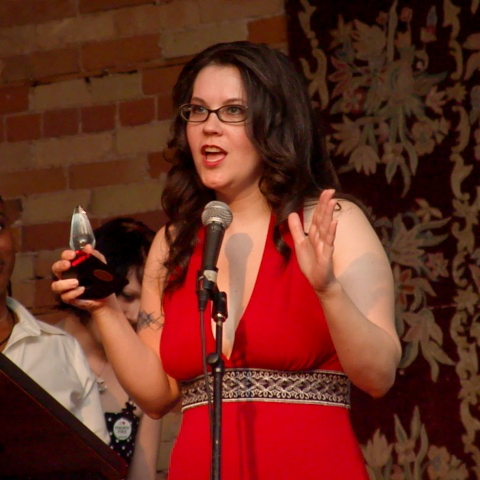
Taormino holding a Feminist Porn Award for her work Chemistry (2007)

In addition to writing, speaking and sex education, she considers herself a feminist pornographer. She made two videos based on her book The Ultimate Guide to Anal Sex for Women. The first (1999) was co-directed by Buttman (John Stagliano) and Ernest Greene. The second (2001) was directed by Tristan herself. In both videos, she takes part in the on-screen sexual activities. Subsequently, she directed Tristan Taormino's House of Ass for Adam & Eve, which shows a number of "porn stars" (from famous to unknown) interacting without a script. In 2006, she directed Tristan Taormino's Chemistry, which is the first in a series of full-length "behind the scenes" movies for Vivid Entertainment where the performers choose who they have sex with, what they do, where and when. She directed four volumes of the Chemistry series as well as sex education films for Vivid Ed, Vivid Entertainment's sex education line that she was instrumental in creating.

== Personal life ==
Taormino uses the terms "queer" and "dyke" to describe her sexual identity. In the past, Taormino stated: "I don't really identify with the label 'bisexual', nor does it feel like it accurately describes me ... I see myself as queer, since queer to me is not just about who I love or lust, but it's about my culture, my community, and my politics. The truth is, even if I were with a heterosexual guy, I'd be a queer dyke." In addition, "she describes herself as 'equal opportunity'. She doesn't like the word 'bisexual' – and says "it's too polarizing."

In addition to being a vocal advocate of non-monogamy, Taormino supports gay marriage: "I support gay marriage being legalised in every state. I do however think it's unfortunate that in some cases gay marriage opponents have used the issue against polyamory."

== Selected publications ==
=== As author ===
- The Ultimate Guide to Anal Sex for Women (Cleis Press, 1997/2006) ISBN 978-1-57344-028-8 – winner of a Firecracker Book Award and named Amazon.com's No. 1 Bestseller in Women's Sex Instruction in 1998. Second edition was released in February 2006, ISBN 978-1-57344-221-3
- Pucker Up: A Hands-on Guide to Ecstatic Sex (ReganBooks, 2001) ISBN 978-0-0603-9415-8 – re-issued in paperback as Down and Dirty Sex Secrets (2003) ISBN 978-0-06-098892-0
- True Lust: Adventures in Sex, Porn and Perversion (Cleis Press, 2002) ISBN 978-1-57344-157-5
- Opening Up: Creating and Sustaining Open Relationships (Cleis Press, 2008) ISBN 978-1-57344-295-4
- The Anal Sex Position Guide: The Best Positions for Easy, Exciting, Mind-Blowing Pleasure (Quiver, 2009) ISBN 978-1-59233-356-1
- The Big Book of Sex Toys (Quiver, 2010) ISBN 978-1-59233-355-4
- Secrets of Great G-Spot Orgasms and Female Ejaculation (Quiver, 2011) ISBN 978-1-59233-456-8
- 50 Shades of Kink: An Introduction to BDSM (Cleis Press, 2012) ISBN 978-1-62778-030-8
- A Part of the Heart that Can't Be Eaten (Duke University Press, 2023) ISBN 978-1-4780-2022-6

=== As editor ===
- Pucker Up: the zine with a mouth that's not afraid to use it (Black Dog Productions, 1995–?)
- Best Lesbian Erotica (Cleis Press, 1996–2009)
- Ritual Sex (Rhinoceros Books, 1996)
- A Girl's Guide to Taking Over the World: Writings from the Girl Zine Revolution (St. Martin's Press, 1997)
- Hot Lesbian Erotica (Cleis Press, 2005)
- Best Lesbian Bondage Erotica (Cleis Press, 2007)
- Sometimes She Lets Me: Best Butch/Femme Erotica (Cleis Press, 2010)
- Take Me There: Trans and Genderqueer Erotica (Cleis Press, 2011) ISBN 978-1-57344-720-1
- The Ultimate Guide To Kink: BDSM, Role Play and the Erotic Edge (Cleis Press, 2012) ISBN 978-1-57344-779-9
- Stripped Down: Lesbian Sex Stories (Cleis Press, 2012) ISBN 978-1-57344-794-2
- The Feminist Porn Book: The Politics of Producing Pleasure (Feminist Press, 2013) ISBN 978-1-55861-818-3
- When She Was Good: Best Lesbian Erotica (Cleis Press, 2014) ISBN 978-1-62778-069-8

=== Journal articles ===
- Taormino, Tristan (2006). "The Danger of Protecting Our Children: Government Porn Regulation Threatens Alternative Representations and Doesn't Save Kids" (PDF). Yale Journal of Law and Feminism. 18 (1): 277–282. hdl:20.500.13051/6939. ISSN 1043-9366.
- Voss, Georgina (2014). "Tristan Taormino Interviewed by Georgina Voss". Porn Studies. 1 (1–2): 203–205. doi:10.1080/23268743.2014.888257. ISSN 2326-8751.

== Awards ==
| Year | Ceremony | Result | Award / Category | Book / Film |
|---|---|---|---|---|
| 1998 | Firecracker Alternative Book Award | Won | Sex | The Ultimate Guide to Anal Sex for Women |
| 2003 | Lambda Literary Award | Won | Lesbian Erotica | Best Lesbian Erotica 2003 |
| 2004 | Lambda Literary Award | Won | Lesbian Erotica | Best Lesbian Erotica 2004 |
| 2006 | Feminist Porn Award | Won | n/a | "House of Ass" |
| 2007 | AVN Award | Won | Best Gonzo Release | Chemistry |
| 2007 | Feminist Porn Award | Won | Hottest Gonzo Sex Scene & Hottest Diverse Cast | Chemistry |
| 2007 | Adam Film World Award | Won | Best Couples Movie | Chemistry |
| 2007 | AVN Award | Nominated | Best Oral Sex Scene | Chemistry |
| 2008 | Feminist Porn Award | Won | Smutty Schoolteacher of the Year | Tristan Taormino's Expert Guide to Oral Sex 1 & 2 |
| 2008 | AVN Award | Nominated | Best Anal-Themed Release Scene | Tristan Taormino's Expert Guide to Anal Sex |
| 2008 | AVN Award | Nominated | Best Director, Non-Feature | Chemistry 3 |
| 2008 | AVN Award | Nominated | Best Oral-Themed Release | Tristan Taormino's Expert Guide to Oral Sex 1: Cunnilingus |
| 2009 | AVN Award | Won | Best Educational Release | Tristan Taormino's Expert Guide to Oral Sex 2: Fellatio |
| 2009 | AVN Award | Nominated | Best Educational Release | Tristan Taormino's Expert Guide to the G-Spot |
| 2009 | AVN Award | Nominated | Best Oral Sex Scene | Tristan Taormino's Expert Guide to Oral Sex 2: Fellatio |
| 2009 | AVN Award | Nominated | Best Gonzo Series | Chemistry |
| 2010 | Feminist Porn Award | Won | The Trailblazer Award | —N/a |
| 2010 | Feminist Porn Award | Won | Smutty Schoolteacher of the Year | Tristan Taormino's Expert Guide to Anal Pleasure for Men |
| 2010 | AVN Award | Won | Best Educational Release | Tristan Taormino's Expert Guide to Threesomes |
| 2010 | AVN Award | Nominated | Best Educational Release | Midori's Expert Guide to Sensual Bondage |
| 2010 | AVN Award | Nominated | Best Educational Release | Penny Flame's Expert Guide to Rough Sex |
| 2010 | AVN Award | Nominated | Best Educational Release | Tristan Taormino's Expert Guide to Anal Pleasure for Men |
| 2010 | AVN Award | Nominated | Best Specialty Release, Other Genre | Rough Sex |
| 2010 | Feminist Porn Award | Nominated | n/a | Rough Sex |
| 2010 | Feminist Porn Award | Nominated | n/a | Penny Flame's Expert Guide to Rough Sex |
| 2010 | Feminist Porn Award | Nominated | n/a | Tristan Taormino's Expert Guide to Threesomes |
| 2011 | Lambda Literary Award | Won | Lesbian Erotica | Sometimes She Lets Me: Best Butch/Femme Erotica |
| 2011 | NLA Samois Anthology Award | Won | Lesbian Erotica | Sometimes She Lets Me: Best Butch/Femme Erotica |
| 2011 | Feminist Porn Award | Won | Hottest BDSM Movie | Rough Sex 2 |
| 2011 | AVN Award | Won | Best Educational Release | Tristan Taormino's Expert Guide to Advanced Fellatio |
| 2011 | AVN Award | Nominated | Best Vignette Release | Rough Sex 2 |
| 2011 | AVN Award | Nominated | Best Couples Sex Scene | Rough Sex 2 |
| 2011 | AVN Award | Nominated | Most Outrageous Sex Scene | Rough Sex 2 |
| 2011 | Feminist Porn Award | Nominated | n/a | Tristan Taormino's Expert Guide to Female Orgasms |
| 2012 | Lambda Literary Award | Won | Transgender Fiction | Take Me There: Trans and Genderqueer Erotica |
| 2012 | Feminist Porn Award | Won | Smutty Schoolteacher of the Year | Tristan Taormino's Expert Guide to Advanced Anal Sex |
| 2012 | AVN Award | Nominated | Best Educational Release | Tristan Taormino's Expert Guide to Advanced Anal Sex |
| 2012 | AVN Award | Nominated | Best Educational Release | Tristan Taormino's Expert Guide to Female Orgasms |
| 2012 | AVN Award | Nominated | Best Group Sex Scene | Rough Sex 3: Adrianna's Dangerous Mind |
| 2012 | AVN Award | Nominated | Best Anal Sex Scene | Rough Sex 3: Adrianna's Dangerous Mind |
| 2012 | AVN Award | Nominated | Best Three-Way Sex Scene | Rough Sex 3: Adrianna's Dangerous Mind |
| 2012 | AVN Award | Nominated | Best Vignette Release | Rough Sex 3: Adrianna's Dangerous Mind |
| 2012 | AVN Award | Nominated | Best Director, Non-Feature | Rough Sex 3: Adrianna's Dangerous Mind |
| 2013 | Feminist Porn Award | Won | Smutty Schoolteacher of the Year | Tristan Taormino's Expert Guide to Pegging |
| 2013 | AVN Award | Nominated | Best Educational Release | Tristan Taormino's Expert Guide to Pegging |
