= Feminist pornography =

Genre of pornographic film developed by and/or for sex-positive feminists

Feminist pornography, also known by other terms in internet such as ethical pornography or fair-trade pornography, is a genre of film developed by or for those within the sex-positive feminist movement. It was created for the purpose of promoting gender equality by portraying more bodily movements and sexual fantasies of women and members of the LGBTQ community.

== Background ==
Feminists have debated pornography ever since the women's movement commenced. The debate was particularly vehement during the feminist sex wars of the 1980s, which is when feminist porn originated. It acquired momentum in the 2000s because of the Feminist Porn Awards, originated by Good For Her in Toronto in 2006. These awards spread awareness amongst a broader audience, extra media exposure, and assistance in uniting a community of filmmakers, performers, and fans. Many third-wave feminists are open to seeking freedom and rights of sexual equality through entering the adult entertainment workforce. However, many second-wave feminists believe that the oppression and/or sexual objectification of women is inherent in all pornography involving them. The conflict between the two waves causes many struggles between these different feminist views of pornography.

Tristan Taormino, who is a sex educator, feminist pornographer, and co-editor of The Feminist Porn Book, has said: 'Feminists pornographers are committed to gender equality and social justice.' Feminist pornography is porn that is produced in a fair manner, where performers are paid a reasonable salary and treated with care and esteem, their consent, safety, and well-being are vital, and what they bring to the production is appreciated. Feminist porn seeks to challenge ideas about desire, beauty, gratification, and power through unconventional representations, aesthetics, and film making styles. The overall aim of feminist porn is to educate and empower the performers who produce it and the people who view it.

== History ==
=== Theoretical origins (c. 1975–1983) ===
From the mid-1970s up until 1983, it was mostly a theoretical discussion amongst feminists (including some self-identified feminist men) whether making feminist porn was even possible. Some feminists, later known as sex-positive feminists, argued that it was, but it still had to be made, sometimes giving a rough sketch of what that should or would look like (for example, Ann Garry's plot in 1983). (Note: 'Ann Garry has suggested that it is possible to walk this fine line and to produce a feminist pornography which would not need to be censored. She has been kind enough to suggest a possible plot (1983: 77–78)'.) Others in the middle said it may be possible, but they had not seen any examples of it yet (1981). A third group, the anti-porn feminists, maintained throughout the 1980s that it was in principle impossible, because 'feminist pornography is a contradiction in terms' or 'an oxymoron', and that whatever was feminist but appeared to be pornographic should instead be labelled 'erotica'. Feminists like Gloria Steinem wrote that pornography promoted unequal power dynamics, while erotica represented sex as a positive expression of sexuality. Others such as Andrea Dworkin claimed that even 'erotica' was too much like pornography to be considered feminist. (Note: "Erotica is simply high-class pornography: better produced, better conceived, better executed, better packaged, designed for a better class of consumer.")

The majority of the feminist debates on pornography were initiated by events such as the 1976 presentation of the film Snuff, in which a woman was shown being mutilated for the audience's sexual satisfaction. Two of the first American feminists to suggest the development of feminist pornography were Deb Friedman and Lois Yankowski (members of the Feminist Alliance Against Rape) in a 1976 article in Quest: A Feminist Quarterly. Claiming that the oppression of and violence against women portrayed in pornography had gone too far (citing the recent controversy around Snuff), but considering that censorship may not be the proper tactic to deal with it, they wrote:

Finally, there is the possibility of developing our own "feminist pornography," that is, non-sexist erotica. We have set out some guidelines for determining what forms of explicit sex should be portrayed as alternatives to the current violence and sado-masochism. Although it may sound far-fetched, developing feminist pornography would help demonstrate what some of these alternatives could be.

— Deb Friedman & Lois Yankowski, "Snuffing Sexual Violence" (1976), Quest: A Feminist Quarterly

The Friedman-Yankowski essay became very popular and was widely reprinted. On the other hand, erroneously believing that its scenes of eroticized torture were real, Andrea Dworkin organized nightly vigils at locations where the film was being shown. She became the main theorist of the U.S. anti-pornography campaign. Well-known feminists, including Susan Brownmiller and Gloria Steinem, joined her to establish the campaign group Women Against Pornography. The anti-porn campaign escalated with Take Back the Night marches around locations such as Times Square, which contained 'adult' book stores, massage parlors (a euphemism for a brothel) and strip clubs. Dworkin and other feminists arranged conferences and lecture tours, showing slide-shows featuring hard- and soft-core porn to women's awareness groups.

=== Rise of feminist pornography (1984–1990) ===
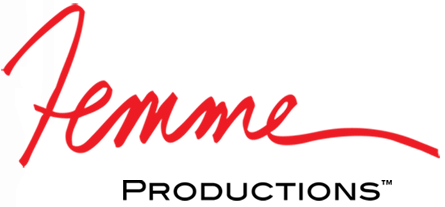
Femme Productions was founded by Candida Royalle in 1984.

In the United States, production of explicitly feminist pornography began in 1984, initiated by two independently formed groups. Dissatisfied with working in mainstream male-centred porn, Candida Royalle founded her own adult film studio Femme Productions and hired performers from the porn actresses support group 'Club 90', which originated in 1983 when they started informally talking about what they wished to change about the industry. Separately, in reaction to the 1983 Dworkin-MacKinnon Ordinance, lesbian feminists founded the sex-positive lesbian sex magazine On Our Backs. This was in reaction to feminist magazine off our backs, which had been campaigning for banning porn in preceding years, and On Our Backs started producing erotic videos the next year under the leadership of Susie Bright. Others including Annie Sprinkle followed in the years thereafter, and by 1990 a small group of feminist pornographers, some of them united in the Manhattan-based Club 90, could be distinguished. Between 1984 and 1990, sex-positive feminists claimed these directors and producers had made feminist pornography a reality, increasingly referring to their works as examples of it. Anti-pornography feminists remained adamant in their opposition, claiming that these productions were either still following the patterns of 'mainstream' or 'male-dominated' porn, or were in fact erotica, a legitimate genre that was separate from pornography.

Meanwhile, in Europe, feminists such as Monika Treut (Germany), Cleo Uebelmann (Switzerland), Krista Beinstein (Germany and Austria) and Della Grace (England) started using sexually explicit pornography and film in order to explore themes such as female pleasure, BDSM, gender roles, and queer desire.

=== Early industry development (1990–2005) ===
In the 1990s and early 2000s, many feminists perceived Dworkin and her anti-porn perspectives as excessively polarized and anti-sex. Feminists continued to debate the extent to which pornography is harmful to women. Some feminists have emphasized the way cybersex encourages its participants to play with identity, as users are able to take on diverse characteristics (e.g. gender, age, sexuality, race, and physical exterior). They point out a number of other benefits from new technologies, such as enhanced access to sex education and 'safe' sex, and opportunities for women and minorities to make contact and to manufacture and allocate their own representations.

The successes of Royalle and Hartley had made an impact on the mainstream adult industry by the 1990s, leading major U.S. studios such as Vivid, VCA, and Wicked to also make couples porn, as well as developing 'a formula of softer, gentler, more romantic porn with storylines and high production values.'

In 1997, the Danish company Zentropa became the first mainstream film production company in the world to make explicit porn under its Puzzy Power subsidiary, aimed at a female audience. The next year, Zentropa published the Puzzy Power Manifesto, which set guidelines for creating porn for women, similar to the standards established by Royalle.

In the early 2000s, a new generation of filmmakers who specifically called themselves or their work "feminist" emerged in the United States and Europe. American examples included Buck Angel, Dana Dane, Shine Louise Houston, Courtney Trouble, Madison Young, and Tristan Taormino, while Europe saw the rise of sexually explicitly independent films identified as feminist pornography by filmmakers such as Erika Lust (Spain), Anna Span and Petra Joy (United Kingdom), Émilie Jouvet, Virginie Despentes, and Taiwan-born Shu Lea Cheang (France), and Mia Engberg (Sweden). The Dirty Diaries (2009) were a compilation of feminist porn shorts directed by Engberg and 'famously funded by the Swedish government', while Swedish-born Lust's 2004 debut The Good Girl released on the Internet for free under a Creative Commons licence, launching her career as 'one of the most celebrated feminist pornographers in the world'.

=== Feminist Porn Awards and beyond (2006–present) ===
The 2006 creation of the Feminist Porn Awards (FPAs) by the Toronto-based sex toy shop Good for Her is said to have significantly spread the influence and recognition of the modern feminist porn movement. The launch of The Feminist Porn Book (2013) 'helped to put feminist pornography on the academic map'. In the same period, some disagreements emerged about what makes certain pornography feminist, and how it may be distinguished from male-centric mainstream porn, exemplified by the controversy over whether to exclude facials (always excluded by earlier feminist filmmakers such as Royalle (1984–2013), Ms. Naughty (since 2000), and Petra Joy (since 2004), excluded in the early career of Taormino (since 1999) but included in her later career, and included by Lust ever since her 2004 debut).

== Public discourse ==
=== Purpose and production ===
Tristan Taormino (2013) has stated that pornography created by women for women can give women control over what is being presented about female sexuality and how it is represented and distributed. She argued that feminist pornography allows women to have a voice in a male-dominated industry. Taormino states:

“Feminist porn searches to expand the ideas about desire, beauty, gratification, and power through unconventional representations, aesthetics, and filmmaking styles. The overall aim of feminist porn is to empower the performers who produce it and the people who view it.”

— Tristan Taormino, Feminist Porn Awards

Royalle (2013) rejected the notion that pornography is automatically 'feminist' whenever it is made by women: 'Rather than creating a new vision, it seems that many of today's young female directors, often working under the tutelage of the big porn distributors, seek only to prove that they can be even nastier than their male predecessors. (...) if they're not concerned with what women want, should it then be considered feminist? (...) What bothers me is the media identifying their work as feminist when it has nothing to do with speaking for women and advancing the principles of feminism.'

=== Performers and society ===
Mireille Miller-Young researched the porn industry between 2003 and 2013. In addition, Miller-Young also interviewed a vast amount of performers and encountered several positive aspects of pornography in women's lives. According to Miller-Young, "For some performers, pornography is a path to college and out of poverty. For others, it is a chance to make a statement about female pleasure." Miller-Young states that the women she interviewed were excited to enter the pornography industry and viewed it as a profitable opportunity as well as an accommodating job that would grant them independence. Women who had worked in retail or in nursing discovered that pornography gave them more control over their labor and greater respect in the workplace. Some women believed being part of the pornography industry had granted them the ability to escape poverty, provide for their families and attend college. Others stressed the inventive features of pornography and stated it grants them the ability to boost their economic mobility while also creating a strong statement about female sexual pleasure. Miller-Young claims that according to the performers she interviewed, the most difficult challenge they dealt with was social stigma, as well as gender and racial inequality.

With regard to the performers, Royalle (2012) explained that there are some women who prefer to be in porn because they enjoy sex and deem it to be a great way of making a living. On the other hand, there are some who approach porn as a mode of acting out or coping with psychological issues, such as searching for their father's love or receiving punishment for being an immoral woman. For some women, it may be a bit of each.

I'm not sure the male performers get out completely unscathed either. While they may not be judged as harshly as the women, ultimately they're viewed as freaks who make their living with their anatomy. John Holmes' fate is the ultimate cautionary tale. Perhaps if we weren't still so consumed with guilt and shame about sex, neither watching nor performing in these films would carry the weight it does. But then, perhaps we wouldn't be so interested in them, either. If the fruit were not forbidden, would anyone care to take a bite?

— Candida Royalle

=== Labour rights ===
Miller-Young (2012) wrote that at both large and small pornography studios, men typically marginalize the viewpoints and concerns of women. The studios place more emphasis on what men wanted because they felt that their products would sell more. Furthermore, these companies often created a competitive environment which pit women against each other. Black performers often received only half to three-quarters of what white performers are paid. Just as in other industries, women and men of color face discrimination and disparities in structural and interpersonal forms. Porn industry workers are striving to get more control over their labor and the products they create. The Internet was by far the most efficient and rapid way to democratize the porn industry. There are a range of women from diverse backgrounds who enter the pornography business, such as soccer moms, single mothers, and college students, who filmed themselves and presented their own pornographic fantasies. The majority of women in pornography felt strongly that society should not treat porn as problematic and socially immoral. However, women in the industry highlight that conditions could be improved, particularly with regard to workers' rights.

=== Facials ===
"I liked porn but I really didn't like how most of it was marketed. (...) The scenes almost always ended with a facial "pop shot" and I didn't want to see that—I thought it was degrading and also kind of stupid. The woman would often kneel with a slightly pained expression on her face, trying to look adoringly up at a man while he squirted semen in her eye. The camera never showed the man's face during orgasm, which—to me–was a travesty. Men's faces are beautiful at that moment. (...) I wanted to change that. I wanted to make porn better."

— Ms. Naughty (2013)

At the 2007 Berlin Porn Film Festival, discussion over the works of such filmmakers as Erika Lust (including The Good Girl) led to disagreements, as some other self-identified feminist pornographers questioned whether certain portrayals such as facials could ever be considered "feminist" (as the directors maintained), or were incompatible with the notion of gender equality of women and men, and thus with feminism. Petra Joy argued: 'Feminism is committed to equality of the sexes, so surely "feminist porn" should show women as equals to men rather than as subservient beings... If you want to show cum on a woman's face that's fine but don't call it feminist.' Lust (2007) retorted, mocking 'the Church of the Pure Feminist Porn Producers... declaring that certain sexual practices that me and other women across the world happen to like, are a sin.'

Separately, as some of her critics alleged, Taormino (2013) has admitted that she cannot control how certain portrayals such as facials may be received by some viewers, 'specifically that men's orgasms represent the apex of a scene (and of sex itself) and women's bodies are things to be used, controlled, and marked like territory'. When making her first film, Taormino 'embraced the notion that certain depictions were turn-offs to all women, like facial cum shots. But my thinking on this has changed over time. I believe viewers appreciate consent, context, chemistry, and performer agency more than the presence or absence of a specific act.'

=== Consumption ===
In 2012, Royalle argued that viewing pornography is not intrinsically damaging to men or women. However, she claimed that there are people who perhaps should not view porn; for example, those with poor body image or those have experienced sexual abuse. Royalle stated that some individuals may develop impractical ideas about sex or what people enjoy, and how they may be expected to perform. She added that watching porn with another individual requires permission. Counselors at times will advise it to assist people in becoming comfortable with a certain fantasy they or their partner may have. Pornography may re-energize a couple's sex life. It can offer stimulating ideas, or assist individuals and couples to get in touch with their personal fantasies. Porn can supply individuals with great satisfaction or at worst, disgust. Royalle emphasized that this all relies on what couples or individuals decide to view. She added that porn is not the issue when it comes to unhealthy sexual behaviors, but rather the compulsive personality of an individual.

Some people argue that consumption of pornography can have negative mental effects. The biggest concerns include increased desire for violent sexual acts, including rape, and dehumanization of women, including the actors in pornographic films. This is debated, as it has been shown consumers of pornography feel aware that porn is fake and/or played up. It is important to remember that women consume porn as well; it is a male-dominated field, not a male-exclusive one. The very idea that erotic films are not intriguing or pleasurable to women upholds the misogynistic idea that women do not, and should not, find erotic material pleasurable.

Some women feel that feminist pornography is more realistic than mainstream pornography. In the field of adult film, believability is highly prioritized. Films that feature extreme reactions to minimal interactions, or bored-looking actors, tend to bore or stress the viewer. Pornography that is made by and for men, with no regard toward feminist ideals or female pleasure, tends to focus primarily on male pleasure and female submission. Feminist pornography is an important resource for women, as it allows them to enjoy erotic films that not only feature, but showcase, female pleasure and a variety of erotic interests that women may have. It tends to avoid the objectification of women. Also, it rejects the idea that, during sexual intercourse, male parties are inherently dominant and female parties are inherently submissive. Feminist pornography makes it a point to explore many different forms of sensuality and sexuality, with a prioritization of authentic and ethical pleasure.

In this sense, feminist pornography can be used as a positive resource to educate women on various forms of pleasure, and to reclaim their own sexuality in a world that often teaches women their sexuality and bodies are dirty or wrong. Studies have shown that increased access to pornography is positively related to sexual education, specifically in terms of understanding ones own sexual identity and interests. The field of pornography is rampant with unethical treatment of actors, violent acts without proper aftercare, and other abuses of power. One facet of feminist pornography is that it seeks to maintain ethics between business and employer, as well as with the viewer. Feminist porn has been reviewed with higher levels of communication shown alongside sexual acts than mainstream porn.

== Characteristics ==
Although challenging, it is not impossible to be a feminist in the artificial environment of mainstream pornography. Nor is it impossible to disrupt the inauthenticity of this staged environment through acting upon one's feminist ethos.

— Madison Young, 2014

Feminist pornography is less likely to be filmed due to a lack of audience demand since a majority of pornography viewers are male. The scope of the adult entertainment industry depends on the preferences of the majority of their viewers, which creates the need for female actresses to be young and overtly sexualized. The increase in this mainstream mass-produced media puts both actresses and producers of feminist pornography at a disadvantage. Some misconceptions of feminist porn that add to their disadvantage are that it is only for queer women, 'vanilla', and 'man-hating'. When working on feminist porn projects, Ingrid Ryberg, feminist porn producer, wanted to make sure to address these stereotypes, while also staying in the realm of feminist pornography. Some producers, like Tristan Taormino, address this by staying away from stereotypical, mainstream tropes, like 'cum shots', while still respecting the expression of rougher sex. The rise of on-screen appropriations, such as items like a strap-on dildo used by and for the pleasure of females during sexual intercourse, has allowed for more agency for women within the industry. Annie Sprinkle is one example of a woman who chooses to partake in many forms of feminist pornography in order to counter-appropriate patriarchal mainstream pornography. Films in which Sprinkle stars contain scenes of her having orgasms instead of her male on-screen partners.

According to Tristan Taormino, "Feminist porn both responds to dominant images with alternative ones and creates its own iconography."

What sets feminist porn from mainstream porn is its intentions. Mainstream pornography is made for mass consumption, profit and arousal; feminist pornography is also made for arousal and profit, but also to create content that purposely shows agency, genuine pleasure, and challenges mainstream standards, like beauty and gender roles. One way to conceptualize these differences is through defining sexual objectification and sexual agency. Feminist pornography focuses on promoting sexual agency.

Some pornographic actresses such as Nina Hartley, Ovidie, and Madison Young are also self-described sex-positive feminists, and state that they do not see themselves as victims of sexism. They defend their decision to perform in pornography as freely chosen, and argue that much of what they do on camera is an expression of their sexuality. It has also been pointed out that in pornography, women generally earn more than their male counterparts. Hartley is active in the sex workers' rights movement.

What goes highly under-recognized is increasing interest in gay porn. There is no simple equation for feminist depictions of queer and lesbian porn when it is also directed to satisfy men's desire to sexualize the films and appropriate the sexuality. Lots of sex festivals and feminist sex positive films have emerged in the past decade focusing on the normalization of sex by way of its initial radicalization. The focus is on body, acceptance, safety for the actors and understanding that sexuality involves more than just the physical but emotional, social, political and more encompassing factors.

Most feminist sex has stemmed from women's movements understanding that they do not want to lean away from sexuality, but they have to lean into it with a different lens – one focusing on safety first, pleasure second – something that should be reflected in sex between real life partners as well.

== Festivals and awards ==
Since 2006, the Feminist Porn Awards have been held annually in Toronto, sponsored by a local feminist sex toy business, Good for Her. The awards are given in a number of categories and have three guiding criteria:

1. A woman had a hand in the production, writing, direction, etc. of the work.
2. It depicts genuine female pleasure.
3. It expands the boundaries of sexual representation on film and challenges stereotypes that are often found in mainstream porn.

However, the Feminist Porn Awards have not been held since 2015.

In Europe since 2009, the best films are nominated with the PorYes-Award every other year.

Feminist artist Jasmin Hagendorfer and her team are organizing the Porn Film Festival Vienna, an event dedicated to feminist and queer approaches to pornography.

== Documentaries and films ==
- Andrea Torrice (1990), Peril or Pleasure? Feminist-Produced Pornography.
- Becky Goldberg (2002), Hot and Bothered: Feminist Pornography.
- Mia Engberg (2009), Dirty Diaries

== See also ==
- Alt porn
- Anarcha-feminism
- Feminist art movement
- Feminist Porn Award
- Feminist views of pornography
- Gender equality
- Go Topless Day
- Lesbian pornography
- Liberal feminism
- Libertarian feminism
- Sex-positive feminism
- Women's erotica
- Women's pornography

== Bibliography ==
- Corsianos, Marilyn (September 2007). "Mainstream pornography and "women": questioning sexual agency". Critical Sociology. 33 (5–6): 863–885. doi:10.1163/156916307X230359. S2CID 145569054.
- Ciclitira, Karen (August 2004). "Pornography, women and feminism: between pleasure and politics". Sexualities. 7 (3): 281–301. doi:10.1177/1363460704040143. S2CID 145175374.
- Dworkin, Andrea (1981). Pornography: Men Possessing Women. Women's Press. ISBN 9780704338760.
- Fritz, Niki; Bryant, Paul (November 2017). "From Orgasms to Spanking: A Content Analysis of the Agentic and Objectifying Sexual Scripts in Feminist, for Women, and Mainstream Pornography". Sex Roles. 77 (9–10): 639–652. doi:10.1007/s11199-017-0759-6. ISSN 0360-0025. S2CID 152206461.
- Griffith, James D.; Adams, Lea T.; Hart, Christian L.; Mitchell, Sharon (July 2012). "Why become a pornography actress?". International Journal of Sexual Health. 24 (3): 165–180. doi:10.1080/19317611.2012.666514. S2CID 143232567.
- Heck, Richard Kimberly (2021). "How Not to Watch Feminist Pornography". Feminist Philosophy Quarterly. 7 (1) 3. doi:10.5206/fpq/2021.1.10609. S2CID 233801831.
- Liberman, Rachael (July 2015). "'It's a really great tool': feminist pornography and the promotion of sexual subjectivity". Porn Studies. 2 (2–3): 174–191. doi:10.1080/23268743.2015.1051913.
- Snyder-Hall, R. Claire (March 2010). "Third-wave feminism and the defense of "choice"". Perspectives on Politics. 8 (1): 255–261. doi:10.1017/S1537592709992842. JSTOR 25698533. S2CID 145133253.
- Steinem, Gloria (1983). "Erotica vs pornography". In Steinem, Gloria (ed.). Outrageous acts and everyday rebellions. New York: New American Library. ISBN 9780030632365.
- Taormino, Tristan; Shimizu, Celine Parreñas; Penley, Constance; Miller-Young, Mireille (2013). The Feminist Porn Book: The Politics of Producing Pleasure. New York: Feminist Press at the City University of New York. ISBN 9781558618190. OCLC 828140733.
- Whisnant, Rebecca (April–June 2016). ""But what about feminist porn?": examining the work of Tristan Taormino". Sexualization, Media, and Society. 2 (2): 237462381663172. doi:10.1177/2374623816631727.
