= Madison Young =

American pornographic actress and director (born 1980)

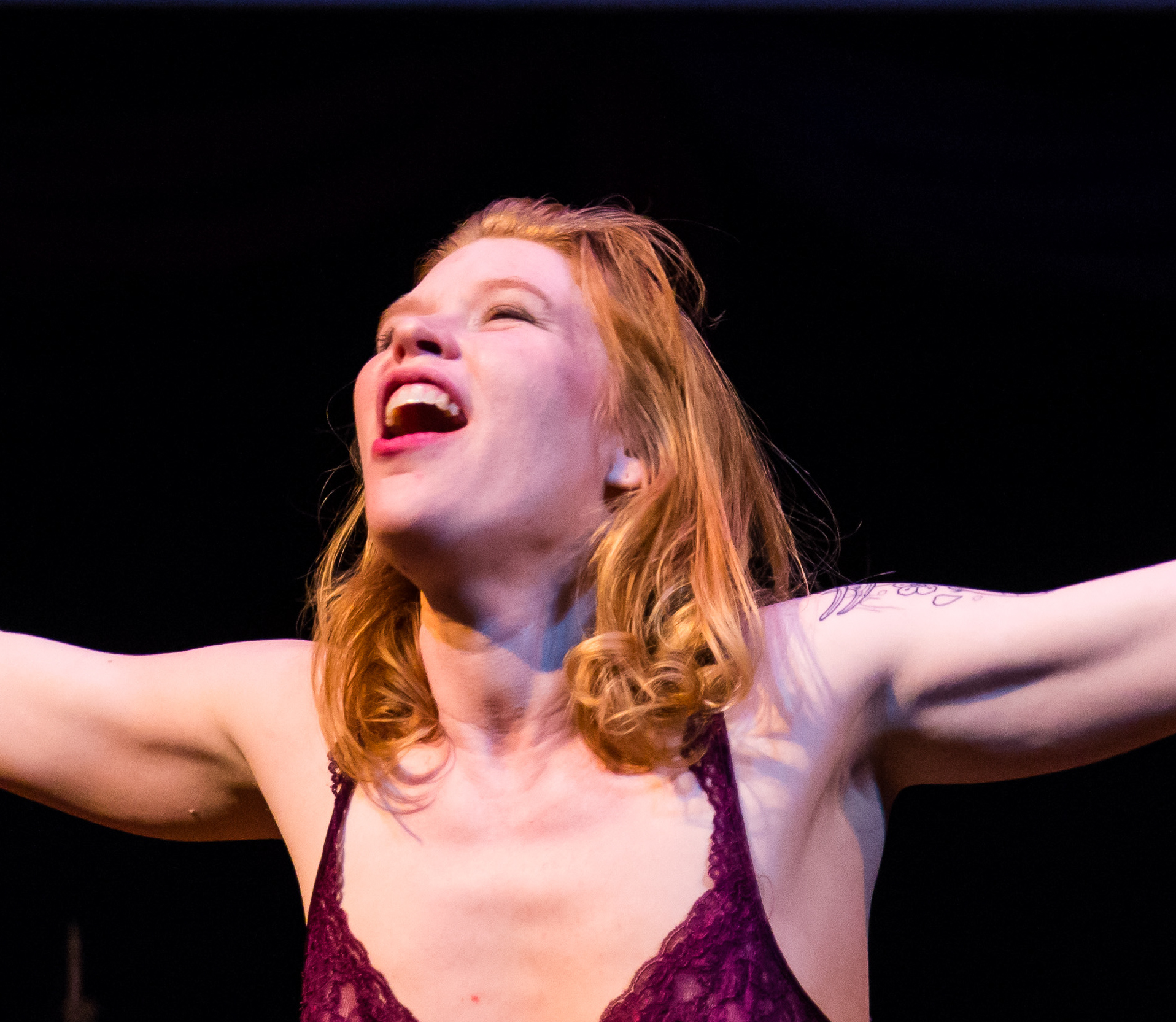
- Young performing in 2018
- Born: September 1980 (age 46)
- Monuments: Feminist porn movement
- Other name: Madison Young–Mogul
- Education: Columbia College Chicago, Antioch College
- Occupations: Filmmaker, author, performance artist, feminist activist, former adult film performer
- Known for: Erotic filmmaking
- Height: 5 ft 2 in (1.57 m)
- Spouse: James Mogul
- Children: 2

Madison Young (born 1980) is an American filmmaker, author, performance artist, feminist activist, and former adult film performer and award-winning erotic filmmaker. Young is a prominent figure in the feminist porn movement and is known for their (Note: Young uses both they and she pronouns.) work as a queer and kink-focused educator and an advocate of sex workers' rights.

Young is the executive producer, director, and television host of the original documentary series Submission Possible, which was first released on Revry TV in 2020, and is the co-host and co-producer of the feminist parenting podcast Wash Your Mouth Out.

== Early life ==
Young was raised in southern Ohio. They attended the School for Creative and Performing Arts in Cincinnati and majored in theater at Columbia College Chicago and Antioch College.

Young moved to the Bay Area in 2000 and founded Femina Potens Art Gallery, a nonprofit art gallery and performance space in San Francisco. Femina Potens served the LGBTQ and kink communities and curated over 500 events and visual art exhibitions during its 14 year long run.

They entered the world of erotic filmmaking in 2002, initially as a performer and subsequently as a director. During this time in Young’s life, they founded the Erotic Film School, an annual erotic filmmaking intensive which sought to empower underrepresented queer and feminist communities to document their own narratives through erotic film.

== Career ==
=== Performance and curation ===
Young curated the Askew Festival, a three-night "experimental, interactive exploration of performance, activism, and counterculture through documentary and experimental film coupled with performance art, readings, and dance" that took place at the Yerba Buena Center for the Arts in San Francisco, CA in 2012, and again in 2014.

They co-starred in the Queer X Tour, a sex positive cabaret show featuring explicit performance art by six performers who addressed sexuality through a feminist and queer lens. French filmmakers Émilie Jouvet and Wendy Delorme followed the tour through Europe from Berlin to Malmö for their 2011 docudrama film Too Much Pussy!.

From 2016 to 2019, Young co-wrote and performed their “one-womxn show,” Reveal All Fear Nothing: A Journey in Sex, Love, Porn, and Feminism, which examined their personal experience in the world of erotic film as both a feminist porn performer and director. The script was inspired by Annie Sprinkle's Post Porn Modernist theater production and written in collaboration with Sprinkle. The show influenced actress Maggie Gyllenhaal's work on the HBO series The Deuce.

Young’s other performance art work has been showcased internationally by institutions including the Museum of Sex, Highways Performance Space, Grace Exhibition Space in New York, and Max Black in Sydney, Australia.

=== Directing and producing ===
Young founded Empress in Lavender Media, a production company working to bring queer, transgender, and sex worker stories to mainstream media through filmmakers within those communities. Their first series, Submission Possible, explores "the queer sexual underground worlds of kink, fetish, and BDSM” across the nation. The first season of Submission Possible was released from 2020 through mid-2022, after delays in production due to the COVID-19 pandemic, and features New Orleans, Seattle, Portland, San Francisco, Los Angeles, and Oakland. Submission Possible was screened at the 2022 CineKink Film Festival and has been selected for screening at the 2022 San Francisco PornFilmFestival.

In 2026, Young released their coming-of-age narrative feature film By the Roots, an adaptation of their memoir, Daddy. Young wrote, directed, and produced the film.

== Other media ventures ==
=== Writing ===
Young’s memoir, Daddy, was published in 2014 with a foreword by Annie Sprinkle. Young followed their memoir with The Ultimate Guide to Sex Through Pregnancy and Motherhood and The DIY Porn Handbook: Documenting Our Own Sexual Revolution, both published in 2016.

Young’s writing has also been published in anthologies including Rad Families: A Celebration, Subversive Motherhood, The Ultimate Guide to Kink: BDSM, Role Play and the Erotic Edge, Ropes, Bondage, and Power: Power Exchange Books' Resource Series, and the Routledge journal Porn Studies.

=== Speaking and guest appearances ===
Young is a noted expert on sex, BDSM, and feminist pornography. Young has taught workshops, given lectures, and acted as a panelist at institutions such as Yale University, University of Toronto, UC Berkeley, and Emerson College.

They have been featured on HBO, the History Channel, MTV's Logo, and on Fusion TV with Alicia Menendez. Additionally, they discussed gender neutral views on parenting and body positivity on Bravo's Extreme Guide to Parenting.

Young has been interviewed for HuffPost, xoJane, The Rumpus, Salon, and Curve, and has been written about in The Feminist Porn Book: The Politics of Producing Pleasure and Pornography Feminism: As Powerful as She Wants to Be. They have also appeared on Amanda Palmer's podcast, The Art of Asking Everything.

== Awards ==
Year	Ceremony	Category	Work	Result
2008	FPA	Hottest Kink Film	Bondage Boob Tube	Won
2009	FPA	Hottest Kink Film	Perversions of Lesbian Lust, Vol. 1	Won
2009	FPA	Indie Porn Pioneer		Won
2010	FPA	Best Bisexual Film	Fluid: Men Redefining Sexuality	Won
2010	AEBN	Best BDSM Release	Perversions of Lesbian Lust, Vol. 1	Won
2013	FPA	Hottest Kink Film	50 Shades of Dylan Ryan	Won
2014	FPA	Best Lesbian Vignettes	Women Reclaiming Sex on Film	Won

== Personal life ==
Young's partner is James Mogul, a film director for Kink.com. Young is non-binary and uses the term queer to describe both their sexuality and gender.
