= Attribution-value model =

The attribution-value model is a framework for understanding individual differences in prejudice, developed by Chris Crandall and colleagues. It states that not only do minorities possess undesirable characteristics incongruent with the majority, but also that minorities are also responsible for them. For example, overweight individuals are viewed as “lazy” and unable to control themselves. This belief that targeted groups should be held accountable for their status arouses negative emotional reactions towards them.

== Empirical support ==
A study by Crandall and his colleagues found that dislike towards the overweight was in fact correlated with beliefs that weight is a matter of choice (e.g. “if fat people would only choose to not eat so much, they would not be fat”). Similarly, Willian Dejong (1980) asked participants to give their impression of a woman who was either overweight because of a medical condition, overweight for no apparent reason, or average weight. The woman depicted as overweight for no apparent reason was rated less favorably than both the woman of average weight and the overweight woman with a medical cause.

The model can also extend to prejudices against homosexuality. Sakalli had Turkish undergraduates complete a homophobia scale and answer questions about the origins of homosexuality, cultural attitudes toward homosexuality, and their own gender and sexual preferences. In general, the participants were prejudiced against gay men and lesbians; the participants who thought that homosexuality was controllable had more negative attitudes toward gay men and lesbians than did those who thought that homosexuality was uncontrollable. In a similar study, Nierman found that the same prejudices existed in American undergraduates, but controllability and cultural value, accounted for only 25.3% of the U.S. variance, while they accounted for 53% in the Sakalli study. Further, those who believe that homosexuality is a result of biology rather than choice express lower levels of anti-homosexual beliefs.

== Theoretical extension ==
As an accommodation to this model, Haslam et al. suggest that two dimensions people use to categorize social groups may also account for differences in attributions. According to these dimensions, groups may be categorized based on a dimension of naturalness or entitativity. The dimension of naturalness refers to the degree that group membership is identified on a biological level. The dimension of entitativity refers to the degree that group membership is defined based on group members being similar to each other.

Some groups such as racial or gender related groups are noted as being high on both dimensions of categorization, however, other groups may possess strength in one dimension over the others. Gay men and lesbians are seen high in the dimension of entitativity but low in the dimension of naturalness. Ultimately, findings from Haslam et al., show that when attribution values towards prejudice are regarding the naturalness dimension group members can’t be held accountable for membership related to a biological factor that can not be controlled. However, groups such as gays or lesbians relate more to the entitativity dimension, and attribution value related to prejudice show a stronger association between prejudice and these groups due to cultural beliefs or stigmatization of negative groups.

Following Gordon Allport (1954). Haslam et al. looked to see if beliefs with a fixed social category related with prejudice towards blacks, women, and gay men. He found that strong relationships exist between these beliefs and anti-gay attitudes, while the relationship to women and blacks was weak by comparison.

== See also ==
- Attributional bias
- Discrimination
- Homophobia
- Individual differences
- Obesity
- Prejudice
