= Yale Journal of Law and Feminism =

- Discipline: Law and feminism
- Language: English

Publication details
- History: 1987–present
- Publisher: Yale Law School (United States)
- Frequency: Biannual

Standard abbreviations
- Bluebook: Yale J.L. & Feminism
- ISO 4: Yale J. Law Fem.

Indexing
- ISSN: 1043-9366
- OCLC no.: 55202700

Links
- Journal homepage; Online archive; Online archive 2

The Yale Journal of Law and Feminism is a law review published biannually by Yale Law School. It was established in 1987 to provide a forum for "women's experiences as they have been structured, affected, controlled, discussed, and ignored by the law." The journal publishes articles, inter alia, on reproductive freedom, the concerns of women of color, judicial prosecution of prostitutes, criticism of judicial deference to the military, and the feminization of poverty.
