= Journal of Asian American Studies =

- Discipline: Asian American studies
- Language: English
- Edited by: Rick Bonus

Publication details
- History: 1998-present
- Publisher: Johns Hopkins University Press (United States)
- Frequency: Triannually

Standard abbreviations
- ISO 4: J. Asian Am. Stud.

Indexing
- ISSN: 1097-2129 (print); 1096-8598 (web)
- OCLC no.: 37937277

Links
- Journal homepage; Online access

The Journal of Asian American Studies is a triannual academic journal established in 1998 and is the official publication of the Association for Asian American Studies. The journal publishes scholarly articles exploring theoretical developments, research interests, policy and pedagogical issues. It also includes reviews of books and other media that relate to the Asian American experience.

The journal is published by the Johns Hopkins University Press and edited by Rick Bonus.
