= Hyenaz =

German avant-garde electronica duo

HYENAZ
- Origin: Berlin, Germany
- Genres: Synthpop, dark wave, new wave, Synthwave
- Years active: 2013–present
- Labels: Freudian/Slit, Freudian/Slit, Records Ad Nauseam, Records Ad Nauseam
- Members: Kathryn Fischer, Adrienne Teicher
- Website: www.hyenaz.com

HYENAZ are a Berlin based avant-garde electronica duo. The band consists of electronic music producers and dancers Kathryn Fischer (Mad Kate) and Adrienne Teicher. They have been called a "monster performance duo" by electroclash artist Peaches (musician) and appeared in the "Best Artists List for 2013" from Whitehot Magazine of Contemporary Art. Their live shows have been described as a kind of physical theatre performance and the band collaborated with the Korean artist Sylbee Kim at The National Museum of Modern and Contemporary Art, Korea in August 2014 for a performance called "Spectral Rite". Their debut self-titled album was released on February 13, 2014 via Freudian/Slit and Records Ad Nauseam. Their second album Critical Magic 비평적 마술 was released on the Berlin label Springstoff on October 21, 2016.

== Discography ==
=== Studio albums ===
- HYENAZ (2014)
- Critical Magic 비평적 마술 (2016)
