= Shine Louise Houston =

American film director

- Education: San Francisco Art Institute
- Occupations: Film director, producer, cinematographer, performer
- Website: Official website

Shine Louise Houston is a filmmaker and the founding director and producer of Pink and White Productions, an independent production company creating queer pornography in San Francisco. Houston makes feature-length pornographic films in addition to producing, directing, and shooting hundreds of installments for her queer porn membership site CrashPadSeries.com. Houston distributes her own work and that of other indie adult filmmakers through PinkLabel.tv, catering to different sexual communities.

== Significance ==
Shine Louise Houston's films have screened at film festivals around the world. Houston speaks widely on issues of representation and sexual freedom of expression. She is heavily involved with the feminist and queer art community as well as doing sexual health work and sex worker activism. In her work, Houston features a diverse range of ethnicities, body types, non-conforming genders, and sexual identities Houston has been written about widely in numerous publications on the intersections of race, pornography, and desire. Ariane Cruz, a professor of women's studies at Penn State, writes in her book, The Color of Kink,

[Houston's] films showcase stunning cinematography, inventive narratives, and incredibly diverse performers with respect to race, gender, and body. Houston's work critically queers representations of black [women's] sexual desire, offering modes of pleasure outside hegemonic, heteronormative representations of black female sexuality in pornography.

Critics have stated that Houston's work counters inauthentic representations of women, trans, gender nonconforming, and queer folks of color's sexuality and desire in mainstream porn. They also feel that Houston incorporates her own pleasure and desire as a black women into her pornography acting as a self-aware voyeur and camera operator.

== Education ==
Houston received a Bachelor of Fine Arts degree in Film from the San Francisco Art Institute.

== Career ==
After graduating, Houston worked at a Good Vibrations sex shop in the San Francisco Bay area for five years. While at Good Vibrations, Houston found an underserved need for queer-made pornography when customers asked for recommendations on the search for representation of their own sexual communities. Community demand inspired Houston to band together with friends to make their own queer pornography. Houston founded Pink and White Productions and in 2008 launched the queer pornography distribution site CrashPadSeries.com. The company's first queer porn feature, Crash Pad, starring Jiz Lee, establishes the location of all the subsequent CrashPadSeries episodes. The Crash Pad is an apartment located in San Francisco dedicated to mutual pleasure based queer sex and Houston acts as Key Keeper to the Crash Pad. Houston incorporates into the scene her presence behind the camera via her own kink, and participation, as a voyeur. In the feature SuperFreak she stars as the ghost of Rick James. The ghost possesses people on a mission to turn the whole world into SuperFreaks having great sex. All models in Pink and White Productions videos seek them out, and Houston organizes scenes around the model's personal fantasies. CrashPadSeries.com debuts episodic, reality-based queer pornography videos. The site is set up like a blog, featuring photos and identity profiles of the stars to make visible the alternate gender identities and sexualities represented in their videos. As of 2017, Houston is in post-production for their next feature, Snapshot, a horror film dedicated to complicating the limited "coming out" narrative predominantly featured in mainstream media.

== Featured publications ==
- A Taste for Brown Sugar: Black Women in Pornography by Mireille Miller-Young
- Black Female Sexualities edited by Trimiko Melancon
- Freeing Ourselves: A guide to Health and Self Love for Brown Bois by The Brown Boi Project
- Porn After Porn, "Mighty Real," Shine Louise Houston, Sept 2014 (Reprinted with Permission in XBIZ Fall 2014 Issue)
- Porn for Pussies: Representations of Queer Female Sexuality in Shine Louise Houston's Pornography by Engel Nicole, Presented at the National Women's Studies Association

== Influences ==
- Annie Sprinkle
- Joani Blank
- Rick James
- Radley Metzger
- Jim Jarmusch
- Alfred Hitchcock
- Michelangelo Antonioni
