= Wendy Delorme =

French writer and performance artist

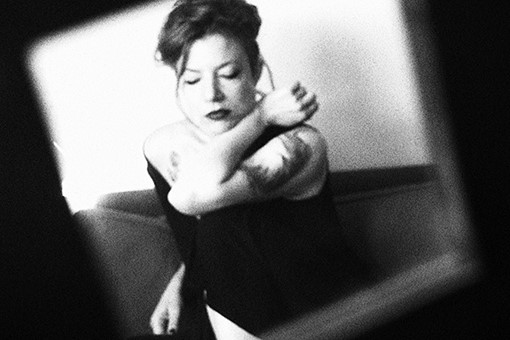
- Delorme photographed by Daria Ivanova, 2018
- Born: 28 July 1979 (age 47)
- Occupations: writer, translator, actor, performance artist
- Writing career
- Pen name: Wendy Babybitch, Klaus Engel
- Language: French
- Genres: feminism
- Literary movement: sex-positive

Wendy Delorme (born 28 July 1979) is a writer, performance artist, actress, and LGBT activist.

As a writer, Delorme published five novels in French, "Quatrième Génération" (Grasset, 2007), "Insurrections! en territoire sexuel" (Ed. Au Diable Vauvert 2009), "La Mère, la sainte et la putain" (ed. Au Diable Vauvert, 2012), "Le Corps est une chimère" (Ed. au Diable Vauvert, 2018), and "Viendra le temps du feu" (Ed. Cambourakis, 2021).

As a performance artist, she goes by the stage names Wendy Babybitch and Klaus Engel, as part of the neo-burlesque theater groups The Kisses Cause Trouble, The Drag King Fem Show, the Cabaret des Filles de Joie and the Queer X Show.

Going under the rubrique of performeuse in her one-woman shows near the racy Pigalle section of Paris, Delorme performs a hyper-exaggerated form of "femininity" as a male drag performer might, which harkens back to theoretical constructs such as "doing gender" or "gender performance" of Judith Butler.

About her performances, Delorme said, "In the morning or in the evening, in my bathroom, I reinvent myself, I become a woman, and that is not biological, it is more a question of belief.

== Works ==
- "Quatrième génération", (Fourth Generation) Grasset, novel, 2007.
- "Insurrections ! En territoire sexuel", (Insurrections! In Sexual Territory) Au Diable Vauvert, essay, 2009 · .
- (dir.) "In-soumises : contes cruels au féminin", avec Gala Fur, (Unsubmissive: Cruel Stories, a la feminine) La Musardine, 2012.
- "La Mère, la sainte et la putain", (Mothers, Saints, and Whores), Au Diable Vauvert, novel, 2012.
- "Le Corps est une chimère", Au Diable Vauvert, novel, 2018.
- "Viendra le temps du feu", Cambourakis, novel, 2021.

=== Translations ===
- Le Petit guide de la sexualité épanouie (The Good Vibrations Guide to Sex: The Most Complete Sex Manual Ever Written) de Cathy Winks et Anne Semans, trans. with Sandrine Bodet, éditions Tabou, 2009.
- Déséquilibres synthétiques (Will Work for Drugs) by Lydia Lunch, trans. with Virginie Despentes, Au Diable Vauvert, 2010.

== Filmography ==
- The final girl, experimental fiction, by Todd Verow, 2010.
- Too Much Pussy! Feminist Sluts, A Queer X Show at IMDb, documentary by her and Émilie Jouvet, 2010.
- Les travailleu(r)ses du sexe at IMDb [The Sex Workers], 2009. documentary about her
- Louis(e) de Ville, portrait d'une bad girl at IMDb 2012. documentary about her
- Ce soir (ou jamais!) at IMDb [Tonight (or Never!)] 2007. documentary about her

== See also ==
- Sex-positive feminism
- Queer theory
- Performance art
- Feminist pornography
