= Feminist Porn Awards (Canada) =

Canadian adult film awards

- Description: Erotica focused on women and marginalized people
- Country: Canada
- First award: 2006
- Website: www.feministpornawards.com

The Feminist Porn Awards (FPAs) is an annual adult film awards ceremony that began in 2006, and was initially organized by the Good for Her adult store In Toronto, Canada. Until 2014, the ceremony was officially known as the Good for Her Feminist Porn Awards.

== History ==
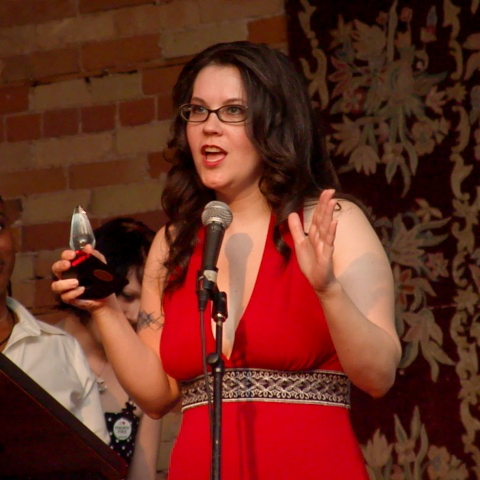
Tristan Taormino holding a 2007 Feminist Porn Award for her work Chemistry (2007)

Good For Her founded the Feminist Porn Awards with the intent to celebrate work that complicates dominant representations of desire, desirability, sexuality and gender. The ceremony was originally conceived of and coordinated by former store manager Chanelle Gallant, and it has been organized by current store manager Alison Lee since 2008. Both the store and the ceremony are based in Toronto, Ontario, and the ceremony commonly takes place at Berkeley Church. Despite the name of the ceremony, Lee states that the films featured at the awards (as well as the ceremony itself) are meant to appeal to men as well as women.

Winners at the FPAs are awarded trophies in the shape of butt plugs.

== Cultural Impact ==
The Feminist Porn Awards contributed a lot to more discussions about gender, sexuality, and representation in the adult porn industry. According to the industry publication XBIZ, the awards helped bring attention to more alternative approaches when it comes to sexual representation and encouraged discussion about who could produce, consume, and be represented in pornography. Some organizers also argued that the awards influenced the industry and the conversations surrounding it about female-friendly content and sexual desirability.

The Awards also showed the efforts that were being made to make feminist and queer pornography more. There is Academic research that examines the Feminist Porn Awards, and other organizations, that have explored how these types of organizations have helped out with promoting categories of pornography that challenged gender and sexuality norms. However, the meaning of feminist pornography has been consistentily debated, including debates about representation, production ethics, and the relationship between feminist values and commecial adult entertainment

== Criteria ==
According to the official website, nominations for an FPA are dependent upon three criteria:

1. Women and/or traditionally marginalized people were involved in the direction, production and/or conception of the work.
2. The work depicts genuine pleasure, agency and desire for all performers, especially women and traditionally marginalized people.
3. The work expands the boundaries of sexual representation on film, challenges stereotypes and presents a vision that sets the content apart from most mainstream pornography. This may include depicting a diversity of desires, types of people, bodies, sexual practices, and/or an anti-racist or anti-oppression framework throughout the production.

== See also ==
- Gender equality
- Feminist art movement
- Feminist pornography
- Feminist views of pornography
- Sex-positive feminism
- Sex-positive movement
- Women's erotica
- Women's pornography
