= Women's erotica =

Erotic material that caters specifically to women

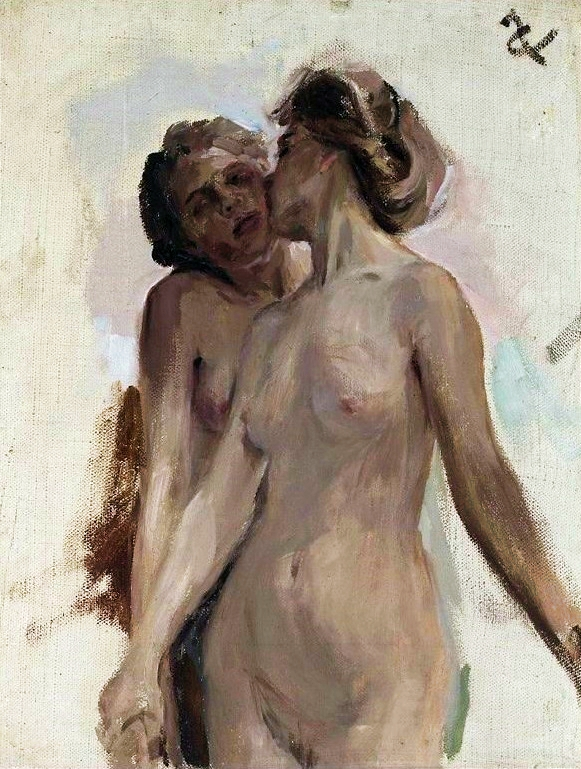
Illustration depicting women's erotica

Women's erotica is any erotic material that caters specifically to women target-demographic of various sexual preferences. When erotica is specifically directed at lesbians, it is referred to as lesbian erotica. Women's erotica is available from a variety of media including video games, websites, books, comics, short stories, films, photography, magazines, hentai and audio. The content may cover many aspects of sexuality, from relationships to fetishes; the main idea being to convey sex-positivism from a woman's perspective, or to feature female empowerment and sexual fantasies.

== Websites ==
Because of the privacy and anonymity offered by the internet, women have increasingly embraced erotic material online. In 2003, Nielsen Netratings noted that more than a quarter of all porn surfers were female. The first women's erotica subscription-based website, Purve, was launched in 1998. The site featured photos of nude men culled from gay sites, articles and sex advice. Sssh.com, a similar subscription site that features original movies and photographic content, was launched in 1999 by Angie Rowntree, who was later inducted into the Adult Video News Hall of Fame, Internet Founders Division, in recognition of her efforts to help establish and grow an online market for women's erotica. In 2015, Sssh.com became the first porn-for-women site to win the XBIZ Award for Best Alternative Site. The first women's adult directory was Ladylynx which featured links to galleries and site reviews. Kara's Links, a similar directory site, began operating soon after.

=== Audio ===
Audio erotica targeted vision-impaired people for many years and became more popular around the late 2010s. However, it commenced much earlier; in the late 20th century, phone sex emerged, where listeners would call in and imagine themselves as a participant, which tends to be the earliest form of pornographic sound. As time went on, more work emerged and audio erotica became a small market in pornography that offered audio-described porn, explicit content in podcasting, erotic ASMR videos, music soundtracks in porn videos, gendering of orgasmic sounds in porn and orgasmic vocal performances in popular music. Nowadays, the most popular phone apps for audio erotica are Quinn and Dipsea, which were founded by women and tended to market to women since they wanted it to be for the founders, friends, and all women who enjoy erotica. Its most popular genre is the male-for-female (M4F) boyfriend experience (BFE).

== Fiction ==
Erotic literature for women has seen explosive growth in the period of 2010–2015. Publishers report that women's erotica novels consistently sell well.

The first publishing imprint of erotic fiction for women was Black Lace, launched in Britain in 1992. It remained unique in publishing for over a decade and was only recently joined in the marketplace by big-name publishers Harlequin, Kensington and Avon, who have released their own "black label" lines for female readers.

The first series of books to feature erotic short stories for women was Herotica, first published by Down There Press in 1996. Author and sex activist Susie Bright founded the series and edited the first three volumes. A similar series is Best Women's Erotica from Cleis Press which has appeared annually since 2001.

Internet-based publisher Ellora's Cave produces what it calls "romantica" - romance novels with explicit sex scenes. The company originally produced e-books but has now moved into printed publishing.

Erotic fan fiction can also be a form of women's erotica.

== Films ==
Women were not acknowledged as a potential audience by pornographic filmmakers until 1985 when former adult star Candida Royalle created her first adult movie for women, Femme. The movie featured explicit sex but focused on the woman's pleasure and refused to include "pop shots" (external ejaculation scenes). Since then, she has made 16 adult films for women. In April 2007, she launched a new line of films, Femme Chocolat, which depicts the sexual fantasies of Black women.

For many years, Royalle was the sole producer of erotic films for women. In 1997, Oscar-nominated director Lars von Trier started the company Puzzy Power, and together with Lene Børglum started producing pornographic films for women, starting with Constance (1998) and Pink Prison (1999). In July 2009, women's magazine Cosmopolitan (German edition) ranked Pink Prison as #1 in its Top Five of Die Besten Frauenpornos (best women's porn), calling it the "Vorbild für die neue Porno-Generation" (role model for the new porn-generation).

In the 21st century, a number of other women have stepped in and created their own vision of women's erotica. These include:

- Swedish director Jessica Nilsson, who made the award-winning feature film All About Anna (2005) for von Trier's Zentropa.
- Danish director Lisbeth Lynghøft, who made the Venus Award-winning feature film Pink Prison (1999) for von Trier's Zentropa.
- Independent filmmaker Estelle Joseph, who used her own money to fund the City of Flesh series, set in New York.
- UK based director and producer Petra Joy who created such films as Sexual Sushi (2006), Female Fantasies (2007) and Feeling It! Not Faking It... (2008), as well as editing the anthology DVD Her Porn (2009).
- Swedish filmmaker Erika Lust whose short film The Good Girl (2004) was included in her feature film Five Hot Stories for Her (2006).
- Nina Lennox, who has produced the Inpulse line of films. These focus mainly on male talent considered good-looking.
- Adult star Tina Tyler, who has created a line of male masturbation films for women.
- Longtime adult producer Kelly Holland, who runs an adult company called Chick Media and produces films for women.

In 2006 Playgirl in partnership with adult company Wicked produced and released their own line of adult films for women.

== Television ==
In 2009, Dusk! TV started in the Netherlands with a 24-hour linear television channel with only erotica and female-friendly porn. All the above-mentioned films are broadcast. More women are starting to produce erotic films; mostly small, independent products and usually from a sense of dissatisfaction with mainstream porn. The content of the television channel is judged and chosen by female audience via Dusk! panel website.

== Magazines ==
Cosmopolitan was the first magazine to include a nude male centrefold – Burt Reynolds in April 1972. Australia's Cleo magazine followed suit in November 1972 with a spread of actor Jack Thompson.

Playgirl magazine, an answer to Hugh Hefner's Playboy, first appeared in 1973 and offered a full-nude centerfold with its second issue. The magazine regularly features nude male models, erotic fiction and sex advice. While the magazine is ostensibly aimed at women, former editor Michelle Zipp has said that around 80% of the readership is gay men. However, feminist and sex journalist Megan Hussey contests the claim that Playgirl was a gay magazine, saying that she led Playgirl's Playgirl Posse fan club, which had a 95 percent female membership. Women's erotica magazines include:

- Filament, a UK-based fashion-free women's magazine featuring intelligent articles and explicit and non-explicit images of men
- Jungsheft, (formerly known as Gluck) a German independent zine featuring "pale, skinny, sometimes hairy, indie boys in the comfort of their own bohemian bedsits"
- Alley Cat, a German-language magazine showing non-explicit photoshoots of men alongside features on sex and fashion.
- Viva, an American adult woman's magazine that premiered in 1973 and ceased publication in 1980.

== See also ==
- Feminist pornography
- Feminist views of pornography
- Human female sexuality
- Sex-positive feminism
- Porn for women
