= List of Danish films of the 1990s =

The following table is a list of films produced in Denmark or in the Danish language during the 1990s. For an alphabetical list of all Danish films currently on Wikipedia see Category:Danish films. For Danish films from other decades see the Cinema of Denmark box above.

Danish Title	English Title	Director(s)	Cast	Genre	Notes
1990
Lad Isbjørnene Danse	Dance of the Polar Bears	Birger Larsen	Anders Schoubye	Drama	Bodil Award for Best Danish Film, Robert Award for Film of the Year
1991
Europa	Europa	Lars von Trier	Jean-Marc Barr	Drama	Bodil Award for Best Danish Film, Robert Award for Film of the Year, 3 awards at Cannes
The Princess and the Goblin	The Princess and the Goblin	József Gémes	Joss Ackland, Claire Bloom, Roy Kinnear, Sally Ann Marsh, Rik Mayall, Peggy Mount, Peter Murray, Victor Spinetti, Mollie Sugden, Frank Rozelaar Green, William Hootkins, Maxine Howe, Steve Lyons, Robin Lyons	Animated fantasy	British-Hungarian-Japanese-American-Danish co-production
1992
Kærlighedens Smerte	Pain of Love	Nils Malmros	Anne Louise Hassing, Søren Østergaard	Drama	Bodil Award for Best Danish Film, Robert Award for Film of the Year
Nemesis		Albert Pyun	Olivier Gruner, Tim Thomerson	Sci-Fi	
1993
De Frigjorte	Fish Out of Water	Erik Clausen	Erik Clausen	Comedy	Bodil Award for Best Danish Film
Den russiske sangerinde	The Russian Singer	Morten Arnfred			Entered into the 43rd Berlin International Film Festival
Sort Høst	Black Harvest	Anders Refn	Ole Ernst, Sofie Gråbøl	Drama	
1994
Nattevagten	Nightwatch	Ole Borndal	Nikolaj Coster-Waldau	Horror Thriller	Robert Award for Film of the Year
Frække Frida og de frygtløse spioner		Søren Ole Christensen	Anette Brandt, Mathias Klenske; Ida Kruse Hannibal, Gunilla Odsbøl	Family	Soundtrack written by founders of Aqua
1995
Menneskedyret	The Beast Within	Carsten Rudolf	Cyron Bjørn Melville	Drama	Bodil Award for Best Danish Film, Robert Award for Film of the Year
Carl Th. Dreyer: My Metier	Carl Th. Dreyer: My Metier	Torben Skjødt Jensen		Documentary	Bodil Award for Best Documentary, Robert Award for Documentary of the Year
1996
Breaking the Waves	Breaking the Waves	Lars von Trier	Emily Watson	Romance	Bodil Award for Best Danish Film, Robert Award for Film of the Year, Entered at Cannes
Portland	Portland	Niels Arden Oplev			Entered into the 46th Berlin International Film Festival
Pusher	Pusher	Nicolas Winding Refn	Kim Bodnia, Mads Mikkelsen, Laura Drasbæk, Zlatko Buric	Thriller	
1997
Barbara	Barbara	Nils Malmros	Anneke von der Lippe; Lars Simonsen	Drama	Robert Award for Film of the Year, Danish submission for Academy Awards; Entered into Berlin
Let's Get Lost	Let's Get Lost	Jonas Elmer	Sidse Babett Knudsen	Drama	Bodil Award for Best Danish Film, Robert Award for Film of the Year
Øen i Fuglegaden	The Island on Bird Street	Søren Kragh-Jacobsen			Entered into the 47th Berlin International Film Festival
	Smilla's Sense of Snow	Bille August			Entered into the 47th Berlin International Film Festival
1998
Nattens engel	Angel of the Night	Shaky González	Erik Holmey, Ulrich Thomsen, Mads Mikkelsen	Horror	Fantafestival Grand Prize winner, Fantasporto Méliès d'Argent nominee
Festen	The Celebration	Thomas Vinterberg	Ulrich Thomsen	Drama	Dogme 95; Bodil Award for Best Danish Film, Robert Award for Film of the Year, Jury Prize at Cannes
Constance	Constance	Knud Vesterskov	Katja Kean	Erotica	Triple AVN Award nominee
Idioterne	The Idiots	Lars von Trier	Bodil Jørgensen, Jens Albinus, Anne Louise Hassing, Nikolaj Lie Kaas	Comedy	Dogme 95, entered at Cannes
Forbudt for Børn	Not For Children	Jesper W. Nielsen	Maurice Blinkenberg-Thrane	Children's	
Skyggen	Webmaster	Thomas Borch Nielsen	Lars Bom	Science fiction	
1999
Bleeder (film)	Bleeder (film)	Nicolas Winding Refn	Kim Bodnia	Crime film, Drama	
I Kina spiser de hunde	In China They Eat Dogs	Lasse Spang Olsen	Kim Bodnia	Action comedy	
Mifunes Sidste Sang	Mifune's Last Song	Søren Kragh-Jacobsen	Iben Hjejle	Drama	Dogme 95, won the Silver Bear - Special Jury Prize in Berlin
Pink Prison	Pink Prison	Lisbeth Lynghøft	Katja Kean, Mr. Marcus	Adult Thriller	Venus Award as Best Scandinavian Film
Den Eneste Ene	The One and Only	Susanne Bier	Sidse Babett Knudsen, Niels Olsen	Romantic comedy	Bodil Award for Best Danish Film, Robert Award for Film of the Year
