= Puzzy Power =

Danish pornographic film company

- Industry: Pornography
- Founded: 1997
- Founder: Lene Børglum
- Defunct: 21 January 2020
- Headquarters: Denmark
- Key people: Elle Fanning | Aidan Stratford
- Products: Pornographic films
- Parent: Zentropa
- Website: www.puzzypower.dk/UK/

Puzzy Power (also known as HotMale) is a Danish film company started in 1997 as a subsidiary to Lars von Trier's company Zentropa, with the goal of producing hardcore pornographic films for women. It is the only time ever a mainstream film company has openly produced hardcore pornographic films.

The initiative was taken by producer Lene Børglum, who as leader of Puzzy Power gathered a group of women (sexologist Gerd Winther, editor Lili Henriksen, porn model and journalist Christina Lohse, line-producer Vibeke Windeløv and production assistant Mette Nelund) and developed a so-called "Statement on women and sensuality", later called The Puzzy Power Manifesto. The manifesto was shaped as a guide for the production of erotic films for women.

== Filmography ==
=== Constance ===
The first film produced by Puzzy Power was Constance (1998), directed by Knud Vesterskov with Katja Kean, Anaïs and Mark Duran in the leading roles. It tells the story of a young woman, Constance, who arrives at the experienced Lola's house, where she is initiated into the mysteries of sexuality. The story is told in flashback via a framing device, with lyrical diary excerpts and narration read by mainstream actresses Christiane Bjørg Nielsen and Hella Joof.

=== Pink Prison ===
The second film was Pink Prison (1999), directed by Lisbeth Lynghøft with Katja Kean and Mr. Marcus in the leads. It's about the photo journalist Mila, who infiltrates a men's penitentiary in hope of obtaining an exclusive interview with the prison warden. The film, which culminates in a lesbian scene with religious subtext, was filmed in the prison set from Lars von Trier's film Dancer in the Dark (2000).

Both Constance and Pink Prison received international attention and became the best-selling sex videos in Scandinavia. In 2001, Constance was nominated for three AVN Awards for Best Art Direction, Best Music and Best Videography. In 2003, Pink Prison won a Venus Award as Best Scandinavian Film. On March 12, 2006, pornography was legalized in Norway, following a case which involved a positive qualitative appraisal of Constance and Pink Prison.

=== HotMen CoolBoyz ===
The third film was the gay feature HotMen CoolBoyz (2000), directed by Knud Vesterskov and starring Ron Athey and Billy Herrington. In this connection, the Puzzy Power company called itself HotMale. The film was no financial success, but was nominated for five GayVN Awards, including Best Foreign Film.

== Restructuring ==
At the start of 2001, Zentropa's CEO Peter Aalbæk Jensen announced his intention to close Puzzy Power, which he claimed had been a financial disappointment. Both Constance and Pink Prison were however still ranking high on international sales lists, and soon after HotMen CoolBoyz was released as an international deluxe DVD-edition. Puzzy Power was not closed, but continued administrating the distribution and income of its three feature productions.

The task of producing new sex films for Zentropa went to a new subsidiary (later independent) company, Innocent Pictures. The two first productions from Innocent Pictures were the educational DVD Femi-X and Beyond (2004), directed by Nicolas Barbano with Joan Ørting as host, and the feature film All About Anna (2005), directed by Jessica Nilsson and starring Gry Bay and Mark Stevens. In spite of a difficult production, All About Anna became an even bigger success than both Constance and Pink Prison.

The full story of Puzzy Power and Innocent Pictures is told in Thomas Vilhelm's book Filmbyen (Ekstra Bladets Forlag, 2007).
