= Innocent Pictures =

Danish independent film company

- Company type: Film
- Founded: 2001; 25 years ago
- Founder: Nicolas Barbano
- Defunct: 19 October 2011
- Headquarters: Copenhagen, Denmark
- Key people: Claus Sørensen and Nicolas Barbano
- Products: Film

Innocent Pictures ApS is a Danish independent film company founded in 2001, originally as a subsidiary of Lars von Trier's film company Zentropa, which is best known for the production of the erotic feature film All About Anna (2005), starring Gry Bay.

== Activity ==
Innocent Pictures is also responsible for erotic late night entertainment on the Danish television channel Kanal København.

In collaboration with MD Lasse Hessel, Innocent Pictures produced the educational DVD Femi-X and Beyond (2004), hosted by Danish sexologist Joan Ørting.

On another front, the company acts as sales agents for the Zentropa-produced Puzzy Power-films Constance (1998), Pink Prison (1999) and HotMen CoolBoyz (2000).
