= Dusk! =

Dutch adult TV channel

- Country: Netherlands
- Broadcast area: National

Ownership
- Owner: 2GrapesMedia

History
- Launched: April 2009

Links
- Website: www.dusk-tv.com

Dusk! is a monthly subscription adult film television channel and website dedicated to "porn for women". Based in the Netherlands, Dusk! is available on all Dutch cable operators (including Ziggo, UPC Netherlands, CAIW and KPN), 15 other European countries and the United States. The channel broadcasts 24/7 and is owned by 2GrapesMedia.

== History ==
Dusk! was founded in 2008 by Martijn Broersma with the aim of building an erotic TV channel based on the sexual preferences of women. When it was launched in the Netherlands in 2009, Dusk! was the first adult TV channel in the world aimed at a female audience. In 2011, the channel was reportedly available to 1.2 million viewers. By January 2015, it had undergone significant growth: all Dutch cable operators offered Dusk! in their erotic package, and 15 other European countries and the United States offered it via video on demand.

The supply of female-oriented adult films – variously known as "porn for women", women's pornography, women's erotica, or porna according to Dusk! – has been increasing since the rise of feminist pornography in the 1980s, and has become increasingly accepted since. With rising success in the 2010s, Dusk! played a significant role in helping many (potential) female porn consumers find what they like according to their own fantasies and needs, which many of them had not found in mainstream porn, which usually only focuses on men's sexual pleasure.

== Content ==
=== Selection process ===
A panel consisting of roughly 2000 women (as of January 2015) together decide which films and videos are broadcast according to what they consider to be porna. This selection process goes as follows:

1. Any woman can apply to join the panel. Panelists can watch the videos for selection for free.
2. The women in the panel regularly view fragments from all kinds of adult films including both hard-core mainstream films and films made from a female point of view.
3. After watching a fragment, the women are asked to fill out a survey, rating and reviewing the fragment. Rating comes in three degrees of "spicy": one pepper for "it turned me on a bit", two peppers for "spicy enough", and three peppers for "super hot". In the review, panelists write what they did and didn't like about the clips, and whether or not they considered it porna or 'just ordinary porn'.
4. Before Dusk! reaches a conclusion about a film, it has to have been viewed and rated a hundred times.
5. Content rejected by the panel is not broadcast. According to Yvette Luhrs, Dusk! programme manager in 2015, this means that certain niches such as hard sadomasochism are excluded because most women in the panel reject it.

=== Result: porna ===
The material that makes it through the selection process is dubbed porna (to distinguish it from 'traditional porn'), and is broadcast. This term, popularised by Dusk! to the extent that it has become a household term in feminist pornography, approximately means 'pornography that women really enjoy,' based on 'intimacy' with a 'clear context', and which is 'realistic, explicit, with 'real' people and a well-balanced development of sexual desire, made with respect.' Broersma and American erotic filmmaker Jennifer Lyon Bell said that porna puts sex 'into a storyline' in which the actors and especially the actresses 'put their hearts into' instead of looking absent-minded. Dusk! employee Xaviera Wong A Soy stated in 2016 that 'this doesn't mean that there is only cuddling and long talks', but that porna can also be rough and in your face, with dominant men or women, and few words. Dusk! net manager Nadine Meanwell said that extra attention is paid to women achieving orgasms (often absent, unclear or faked in mainstream porn), and showing the entire body of a man instead of just his penis (a turnoff for many women watching mainstream porn).

Some critics including former employee Yvette Luhrs have claimed that the selection process filters out a lot of niches of female sexuality, such as hard sadomasochism and more 'mainstream' porn that some women do enjoy. Dusk! thus excludes minority preferences amongst women and its porna is therefore appealing to most, but not all female viewers.

== Directors and films ==
The TV channel schedules films by female porn directors including Candida Royalle, Petra Joy, Erika Lust, Anna Span, Tristan Taormino, Émilie Jouvet, and Maria Beatty. Some of these directors make feminist pornography or pornography targeted at a female audience, while others cater to couples.

The channel also broadcasts short films by Swedish filmmaker Mia Engberg, who, along with twelve other directors, produced a collection of feminist pornographic short films entitled Dirty Diaries.
