= Fem porn =

Fem porn may refer to:

- Feminist pornography (feminist porn, fem porn), a style of pornography based on sex-positive feminist ideas
- Porn for women (women's porn, women's pornography, female porn, fem porn), a genre of pornography aimed at a female audience

== See also ==
- Women's erotica, any erotic material (including literature, games, audio, photography, and video) aimed at a female audience
