= Love Is Waiting =

Love is Waiting may refer to:

- "Love Is Waiting" (Crispy song), 1998
- "Love Is Waiting", song by Sérgio Mendes from Sérgio Mendes
- "Love is Waiting", song by Cindy Morgan from Elementary
- "Love is Waiting", song by Al Jarreau from Jarreau
- "Love is Waiting", song by Kylie Minogue from Kylie Minogue
