= Hawksworth =

Hawksworth may refer to:

== Places ==
- Hawksworth, Nottinghamshire, village in Nottinghamshire, England
- Hawksworth, Leeds, a suburb in the Kirkstall area of Leeds, West Yorkshire, England
- Hawksworth, Guiseley, a village in the City of Leeds Metropolitan District, West Yorkshire, England

== Other uses ==
- Hawksworth (surname)
- Hawksworth Restaurant, fine-dining restaurant in Vancouver, British Columbia, Canada

== See also ==
- Hawkesworth, a surname
