= Hawkesworth =

Hawkesworth is a surname. Notable people with the surname include:

- Bob Hawkesworth (born 1951), Canadian politician
- John Hawkesworth (book editor) (c. 1715–1773), English writer and book editor
- John Hawkesworth (Army general) (1893–1945), British Army Lieutenant-General
- John Hawkesworth (producer) (1920–2003), English television producer and script writer
- M. Maurice Hawkesworth (born 1960), American songwriter and producer
- Walter Hawkesworth (playwright) (c. 1573–1606), English playwright
- William de Hawkesworth (died 1349), English medieval college head and university chancellor

== See also ==
- Hawkesworth baronets
- Hawksworth (disambiguation)
