= Cellastic =

Cellastic or celastic may refer to:

- Cellastic, tyres on the M39 Pantserwagen armoured car
- Cellastic, a protective material based on human cell structure invented by Lasse Hessel
- Celastic, a modelling material; See Ree Morton

== See also ==
- Silastic, a flexible, inert silicone elastomer
