= Last Exit =

Last Exit may refer to:

== Film ==
- Last Exit (2003 film), a Danish thriller by David Noel Bourke
- Last Exit (2006 film), a Canadian TV movie starring Kathleen Robertson
- The Last Exit (film), or Little Bone Lodge, a 2023 British psychological thriller

== Music ==
- Last Exit (British band), a 1970s British jazz fusion band
- Last Exit (free jazz band), a 1986–1994 American free-jazz group
- Last Exit (Junior Boys album) or the title song, 2004
- Last Exit (Last Exit album), 1986
- Last Exit (Traffic album), 1969
- The Last Exit, an album by Still Corners, or the title song, 2021
- Last Exit, an album by the Crumbs, 2004
- "Last Exit", a song by Pearl Jam from Vitalogy, 1994

== See also ==
- Last Exit on Brooklyn, a defunct coffeehouse in Seattle, Washington, US
- Final Exit, a 1991 suicide self-help book by Derek Humphry
- The Final Exit, a 2017 Indian Hindi-language film
