= No Right Turn =

- Directed by: David Noel Bourke
- Written by: David Noel Bourke
- Produced by: LEP Studios Supersonic-Duckling APS Fridthjof Film Axis Mundi Studios Zentropa
- Starring: Sira Stampe; Laura Bach; Tao Hildebrand; Lars Lippert; Mads koudal
- Cinematography: Eric Witzgall
- Music by: Jacob Moth
- Distributed by: Lono Entertainment (US/Canada); Another World Entertainment (Denmark); Njuta films (Sweden)
- Release date: 2009
- Running time: 91 mins
- Country: Denmark
- Language: English

No Right Turn is a Danish independent erotic thriller film directed by David Noel Bourke. It stars Laura Bach, Sira Stampe, Tao Hildebrand and Lars Lippert.

It officially premiered at Denmark's prestigious CPH:PIX Film Festival in 2009 where it showcased in the new Danish talent category.

California based company Lono Entertainment, officially released the DVD in North America and Canada. It has also been released in Denmark via Another World Entertainment and in Sweden via Njuta Films.

== Movie Plot ==
Nina is the girlfriend of Johnny, a crook. To escape from her life with Johnny she sleeps with an old friend, Teddy. One night after an argument with Johnny, she storms home where she is abducted by a pair of thugs but is rescued by a girl, Monella. Together Nina and Monella begin a relationship that leads to a plot to steal Johnny's drug stash hidden in a safety deposit box. But nothing goes as planned and the two women get caught up in a tale of revenge and betrayal that sends all four characters to their destiny.

== Background and themes ==
After No Right Turn officially premiered at the CPH:PIX film festival 2009.

The Danish newspaper Berlingske Tidende described it as a breath of fresh air in the Danish film industry.

International reviews were also positive, with UK's critic MJ Simpson stating it is A clever, tightly honed script combines with assured direction and a central quartet of excellent performances make No Right Turn a real joy to watch.

The film was produced with a small cast and crew. No Right Turn is a character-based dreamy movie blending film noir, pulp, crime and fantasy.
