= Bakerman (film) =

- Directed by: David Noel Bourke
- Written by: David Noel Bourke
- Produced by: LEP Studios; TBT Productions; Æstetiske Billeder
- Starring: Mikkel Vadsholt; Siir Tilif; Brian Hjulmann; Mia Lerdam; Pejman Khorsand-Jamal
- Cinematography: Rasmus Leo Hansen, Nikolaj Lindblad
- Music by: Tsv Nst
- Release date: 2016
- Running time: 83 mins
- Country: Denmark
- Languages: Danish, English, Turkish

Bakerman is a feature film written and directed by David Noel Bourke. It stars Mikkel Vadsholt as Jens, alongside Siir Tilif, Brian Hjulmann, and Mia Lerdam. The movie evolved from a previous project, White Pig, whose scope was too large to shoot independently, so the filmmaker took one character and developed a movie about him.

== Plot ==
Jens (Mikkel Vadsholdt) is a reclusive night-owl. In the midst of a mid-life crisis, the quality of his work as a baker begins to decline. When a group of young people smash the window of his car, his temper breaks and he knocks one of them out. Jens finds new purpose through vigilantism, leading him down a destructive path.

== Release ==
Bakerman had its world premier at CPH:PIX. The official Irish premier was at the Dingle International Film Festival in 2017, where the director also participated in a special Independent Journey panel to discuss the making of this feature film along with other filmmakers.

Bakerman also was officially selected at Filmfest München 2017, where the film participated in the international independents section of the festival program. Other notable film festivals that invited the film for screenings include Nordic International Film Festival in New York (where the lead actor won the Best Male Actor Award), the Scandinavian International Film Festival in Finland, the Richard Harris International Film Festival in Ireland, and the Lund International Fantastic Film Festival in Sweden (where it was nominated for the Méliès d'argent award for Best Feature Film).

== Accolades ==
Mikkel Vadsholt's performance as Jens won the 2017 Best Male Actor Award at the Nordic International Film Festival.

The film won the Best Foreign Film award at the Maryland International film festival, which was presented to director David Noel Bourke.
