= Last Exit (2003 film) =

- Directed by: David Noel Bourke
- Written by: David Noel Bourke
- Produced by: Last Exit Productions
- Starring: Gry Bay; Morten Vogelius; Peter Ottesen; Jette Philipsen; Nicholas Sherry
- Distributed by: Heretic Films (US/Canada); Cult Movies Entertainment (Germany, Switzerland, Belgium); Midget Entertainment (Denmark)
- Release date: 2003
- Running time: 97 mins
- Country: Denmark
- Languages: English; Danish
- Budget: 1500 Dollars/ 10,000 DKK

Last Exit is a Danish independent neo-noir film. Shot on a low budget, it features actress Gry Bay.

== Plot ==
Nigel (Morten Vogelius) is an incompetent criminal who flees his native England to Copenhagen in order to escape the loan sharks who are after him. He and his wife Maria (Jette Philipsen) shack up at a hotel, while each struggles separately with a drug problem. Maria manages to get a straight job, and Nigel gets a gig storing illegal goods for a local crime boss known as the President (Peter Ottesen). Things heat up when Nigel falls for Tanya (Gry Bay), a hooker who works for the President, and their affair makes him ever more distant from Maria. The stage is set for a sex and violence-fueled descent into mayhem as the plot twists and secrets are revealed. Maria gets pregnant and Nigel starts to snap, and the only sane one seems to be Jimmy, Nigel's existential pot dealer. Dark humor and a driving pop-rock score complete the dark and atmospheric story.

== Movie background ==
The film was written and directed by Irish-born independent filmmaker David Noel Bourke. This, his first feature film, was made at a cost of US$1500. It was shot "guerilla style" using a digital camera without a crew. It has a moody storyline with an offbeat soundtrack. The movie features a heady style of sex, violence and philosophical speeches. It is distributed on DVD in the US, Canada, Germany, Belgium, Switzerland and Denmark.
