= United Nations Commission for Lifesaving Commodities for Women and Children =

United Nations commission

The UN Commission on Life-Saving Commodities for Women and Children (UNCoLSC) was set up as part of the United Nations Secretary-General's Every Woman, Every Child programme. It is premised on the projection that a strong worldwide intervention has the power to save over 6 million lives by 2015 through increasing access to, and appropriate use of, 13 lifesaving commodities that are underutilized during pregnancy, childbirth, and early childhood (especially under-five years). The UNCoLSC therefore works to make these thirteen life-saving commodities more widely available and used in low-income nations to forestall preventable maternal and child deaths.

These thirteen commodities are below with the common barriers or medical conditions that they prevent or help in parentheses:

1. Oxytocin - (postpartum haemorrhage)
2. Misoprostol - (postpartum haemorrhage)
3. Magnesium sulfate - (eclampsia and severe pre-eclampsia)
4. Injectable antibiotics - (newborn sepsis)
5. Antenatal corticosteroids (ANCs) - (preterm respiratory distress syndrome)
6. Chlorhexidine - (newborn cord care)
7. Resuscitation devices - (newborn asphyxia)
8. Amoxicillin - (pneumonia)
9. Oral rehydration salts (ORS) - (diarrhoea)
10. Zinc - (diarrhoea)
11. Female condoms - (family planning and contraception)
12. Contraceptive implants - (family planning and contraception)
13. Emergency contraception (family planning and contraception)

== See also ==
- Female Condom - Awareness and Access
