= Electric Parc =

Danish film company

Electric Parc is a Danish film company that produces DVDs, behind-the-scenes-featurettes, and websites.

It is located in Filmbyen and is closely related with Zentropa.

Electric Parc's DVD box-set of Lars von Trier's Europa trilogy won the 2005 Mipcom DVD Award in the category Best Original Release for "quality, creativity and innovation in DVD content".

Currently, it operates under the name Zentropa Arts.
