= Gerda Gilboe =

Danish actress (1914–2009)

- Born: 5 July 1914; Denmark
- Died: 11 April 2009 (aged 94); Copenhagen, Denmark
- Occupation(s): Danish film actress, singer
- Years active: 1943–2003

Gerda Gilboe (5 July 1914 – 11 April 2009) was a Danish actress and singer. She appeared in 18 films between 1943 and 2003.

== Life ==
Gilboe was born in 1914. She was the daughter of a blacksmith, Gilboe started her career in musical theatre and operas in Aarhus before she moved to Copenhagen to work at different theatres. Her national breakthrough came, when she accepted the role as Eliza in My Fair Lady at Falkoner Teatret at short notice in 1960. Although she was then in her mid-40s and had only five days to learn the part, the production was a huge success.

In the following years she took on more and more non-singing roles, and besides her theatre career she took a degree in rhetoric. Later in her life she started teaching rhetoric and drama. She appeared in several films, receiving particular acclaim for her appearance as Esther in Carlo & Esther, a 1994 film. She plays a woman in her 70s who catches the attention of Carlo who has a wife with Alzheimer's disease. Rides on his motorbike lead to an affair.

== Death ==
Gilboe died on 11 April 2009 at an actors' home in Copenhagen, aged 94.

== Filmography ==
- A Time for Anna (2003)
- Kærlighed ved første hik (1999)
- Dybt vand (1999)
- Possessed (1999)
- Antenneforeningen (1999)
- Kun en pige (1995)
- Elsker elsker ikke... (1995)
- Carlo & Ester (1994)
- Lad isbjørnene danse (1990)
- Isolde (1989)
- Sidste akt (1987)
- Walter og Carlo – yes, det er far (1986)
- Pas på ryggen, professor (1977)
- Kun sandheden (1975)
- Den kyske levemand (1974)
- Lise kommer til Byen (1947)
- En ny dag gryer (1945)
- Moster fra Mols (1943)
