= Vlogger (film) =

- Directed by: Ricard Gras
- Written by: Ricard Gras
- Produced by: David Matamoros
- Starring: Irina Sanjeevan; Eduard Alejandre; Nico Baixas; Roger Batalla
- Cinematography: Ricard Gras; Kim Gázquez
- Edited by: Jordi López; Bernat Udina
- Music by: Óscar Kaiser
- Production company: Zentropa Spain
- Distributed by: TrustNordisk
- Release date: 2011
- Running time: 63 minutes
- Country: Spain
- Language: Catalan
- Budget: €300,000

Vlogger is a 2011 Catalan-language Spanish political thriller film written and directed by Ricard Gras in his directorial debut. It stars Irina Sanjeevan as a computer specialist who enters the virtual world of her brother's favourite game, Second Life, in order to find him and prevent his planned suicide bombing.

Produced by Zentropa Spain on a budget of €300,000, the film features heavy use of machinima and was distributed internationally by TrustNordisk.

== Plot ==
Pakistani computer specialist Tania works in Barcelona, where she learns that her missing twin brother has returned to playing the video game Second Life. She soon discovers that he has been recruited into a terrorist group and plans to become a suicide bomber; with just six days left before his terrorist mission, Tania begins exploring the virtual world of Second Life using an avatar in order to find him and prevent the bombing.

== Cast ==
- Irina Sanjeevan as Tania
- Eduard Alejandre as Frank
- Nico Baixas as Kendrick
- Roger Batalla as Angel Garcia

== Production ==
The film was produced by Zentropa Spain on a budget of €300,000. It combines animated footage shot inside a virtual world with live footage from webcams, featuring a strong transmedia element. Funding was possible due to winning an ICAA New Media Fund 2010 Competition. It was the debut film of Catalan filmmaker Ricard Gras.

== Release ==
Vlogger premiered at the 2011 Sitges Film Festival. International distribution was handled by TrustNordisk.
