= Jennifer Lyon Bell =

American director and producer (born 1968/1969)

- Born: 1968 or 1969 (age 56–57)
- Education: Harvard University (B.A.); University of Amsterdam (M.A.)
- Occupations: Erotic film director; producer; curator; teacher; writer
- Movement: Feminist pornography

Jennifer Lyon Bell (born 1968 or 1969) is an American erotic film director/producer, curator, teacher, and writer. She is one of the early members of the feminist pornography movement and ethical porn movement, alongside Erika Lust, Shine Louise Houston, Tristan Taormino, and Maria Beatty. She is the founder and creative director of the independent production company Blue Artichoke Films in Amsterdam, the Netherlands.

She has honors degrees from Harvard University in Psychology, (B.A.) and from the University of Amsterdam in Film + Television Studies (M.A.).

== Films ==
Bell founded the production company Blue Artichoke Films in 2004.

Bell's films have been cited for their sense of intimacy, realism, and authenticity.

Bell says she aims to create positive social change with her erotic films by purposely eroticizing sexual communication between partners, by diversifying portrayals of gender, and by showing diversity in both casting (diverse race, body type, etc.) and in showing the flexible, diverse, creative nature of sex.

Her films have been covered in Vice, BuzzFeed, Playboy, Filmmaker, Dazed, Cosmopolitan, and Huffington Post, among others.
