= Possessed (1999 film) =

1999 film directed by Anders Rønnow Klarlund

- Directed by: Anders Rønnow Klarlund
- Written by: Ola Saltin; Anders Rønnow Klarlund
- Produced by: Christel Jacobsen; Thomas Mai
- Cinematography: Eigil Bryld
- Edited by: Steen Schapiro; Camilla Skousen
- Music by: Igor Sterpin
- Release date: 25 June 1999 (Denmark)
- Running time: 99 minutes
- Countries: Denmark; Romania
- Language: Danish

Possessed (Danish: Besat) is a 1999 Danish fantasy film directed by Anders Rønnow Klarlund, who wrote it with Ola Saltin. It stars Ole Lemmeke, Ole Ernst, Jesper Langberg, and Bjarne Henriksen. The film premiered at the 1999 Toronto International Film Festival.

It received the Méliès d'Or for Best European Fantastic Film.

== Cast ==
- Ole Lemmeke as Søren
- Ole Ernst as Bentzon
- Niels Anders Thorn as Jensen
- Jesper Langberg as Lyndfelt
- Bjarne Henriksen
- Nikolaj Lie Kaas
- Iben Hjejle
- Søren Elung Jensen
- Gerda Gilboe
- Udo Kier
- Valentin Popescu
- Cristina Deleanu
