= All About Anna =

2005 film by Jessica Nilsson

- Directed by: Jessica Nilsson
- Written by: Anya Aims; Loretta Fabiana
- Produced by: Marcella Lindstad
- Starring: Gry Bay; Mark Stevens; Eileen Daly
- Cinematography: Claus Lykke
- Edited by: Martin Bernfeld
- Music by: M. Maurice Hawkesworth
- Production companies: Innocent Pictures; Zentropa
- Distributed by: Team Video Plus
- Release date: 24 November 2005 (Denmark)
- Running time: 91 minutes
- Country: Denmark
- Language: English

All About Anna is a 2005 Danish erotic film directed by Jessica Nilsson and starring Gry Bay and Mark Stevens. The film is explicit in its exploration of sexual relationships.

It is a co-production between Innocent Pictures and Lars von Trier's Zentropa Productions, and is the third of Zentropa's sex films for women, following Constance (1998) and Pink Prison (1999). All three films were based on the Puzzy Power Manifesto developed by Zentropa in 1997.

== Plot ==
Anna (Gry Bay) is a single woman who seeks to maintain an active sex life while staying clear of emotional involvement, after having been jilted by the love of her life, Johan (Mark Stevens). She has a relationship with Frank (Thomas Raft), but refuses to let him move in with her. When Johan shows up again after five years absence, she starts wondering how much longer she can maintain her emotional independence, and if that is what she wants. She has sex with him, loses his telephone number and cannot contact him. She ends her affair with Frank and when she is offered a job as costume designer in a French theatre, she decides to move to Paris. She leaves her flat to her flatmate Camilla (Eileen Daly) who asks her permission to rent out the now empty room to a friend of hers. This friend turns out to be Johan, and Anna meets him as she leaves for Paris, where the local stage actors Pierre (Morten Schelbech) and Sophie (Ovidie) offer new amorous temptations, but she worries about Johan finding a new love. In the end she returns to Copenhagen and, after mistakenly thinking that Johan has been unfaithful to her, she faces her fears of commitment and is reunited with him.

== Production ==
Gry Bay said she didn't have an orgasm during the sex scenes with Mark Stevens and emphasized that both condoms and lubricant were used.

== Release and distribution ==
The film was originally released in November 2005 on a Scandinavian three-disc DVD. This was the first Danish pornographic film to be released with subtitles for the hearing-impaired, which was enthusiastically received by the deaf community.

The US theatrical premiere was held on 18 January 2007 in Chicago, where it was included in the series Cinematic Sexualities in the 21st Century, arranged by Doc Films in collaboration with The University of Chicago Film Studies Center.

The two-disc US DVD was released on January 29, 2008.

All About Anna was officially selected for Zurich Film Festival and Io Isabella International Film Week.

In September 2009, it was released theatrically in the United Kingdom as a double bill with Lars von Trier's Antichrist (also a Zentropa-produced film with sexually explicit images).

== Reception and awards ==
In 2006 it was nominated for two EroticLine Awards in the categories Best International Newcomer (Gry Bay) and Best International Actor (Mark Stevens).

In 2007, it won three Scandinavian Adult Awards, including Best Scandinavian Couples Film, Best Scandinavian Actor (Thomas Raft) and Best Selling Scandinavian Star of 2006 (Gry Bay).

In September 2007, Germany's biggest weekly magazine Stern identified women's pornography as one of 50 trends, placed an image from All About Anna on the cover of its cultural supplement Stern Journal, and commented:

"Women too like to see other people having sex. What they don't like is the endless close-ups of hammering bodyparts without a story. Lars von Trier is the first to have realized this and produced valuable quality porn films for women."

— Stern #40, 27.9.2007

In her book Secrets of Porn Star Sex (Infinite Ideas, 2007), British author Marcelle Perks includes a chapter on female-friendly porn, in which she concludes: "Rather than being intimidated by porn, do a bit of research and find something that you can have fun with. An ideal introduction movie is the hit film All About Anna, a mainstream film that features real sex".

In April 2008, the U.S. trade journal AVN gave the film an AAAAA Editor's Choice Review. It was one of only four films to receive the journal's highest rating that month. Critic Jared Rutter wrote:

"It is beautifully crafted and constantly entertaining. [...] The question is, why can't mainstream American films move on up to this grown-up degree of sexual explicitness? Retailing: This title can be sold as either mainstream or adult–the best of both worlds."

— Jared Rutter, AVN Magazine, April 2008

In May 2008, French trade journal Hot Vidéo #208 placed All About Anna highest in the category "la crème du porno feminine".

In May 2008, Danish lifestyle magazine Woman #112 had asked a group of female readers to rate a selection of erotic product, including books, websites, CDs etc. The highest score went to All About Anna.

In June 2008, the trade journal AVN Europe gave the film an 8 out of 10 rating, and wrote:

"A good couples' flick for those who like a nice storyline. [...] Visually and musically, the movie is also well made and the packaging includes two extra discs with additional material such as an alternative version, outtakes and bloopers. So all in all, a good movie for couples and perhaps, dare I say it, a good movie for guys wanting to turn their wife/girlfriend on to saucy DVD pleasures."

— Angel Swede, AVN Europe, June 2008

In November 2008, the film was nominated for four AVN Awards in the following categories:

- Best Foreign Feature
- Best Music Soundtrack
- Best Packaging
- Best On-Line Marketing Campaign – Individual Project (AllAboutAnna.com)

This among other things marked the first Best Foreign Feature AVN Award nomination for an Academy Award-nominated company. (Note: Zentropa received Academy Award nominations for Breaking the Waves, After the Wedding and At Night.)

In January 2009, All About Anna ranked number two on a top-ten of female-friendly sex films published on the Website of Europe's biggest newspaper, Bild. The list also included Constance and Pink Prison.

== Release versions ==
The film exists in at least three versions. The original Scandinavian DVD release contains both the Producer's Cut and the Director's Cut. A Softcore Version with no explicit sexual footage has also been released in Germany.

== See also ==
- List of mainstream films with unsimulated sex
