= Female condom =

Device for birth control and STI prevention

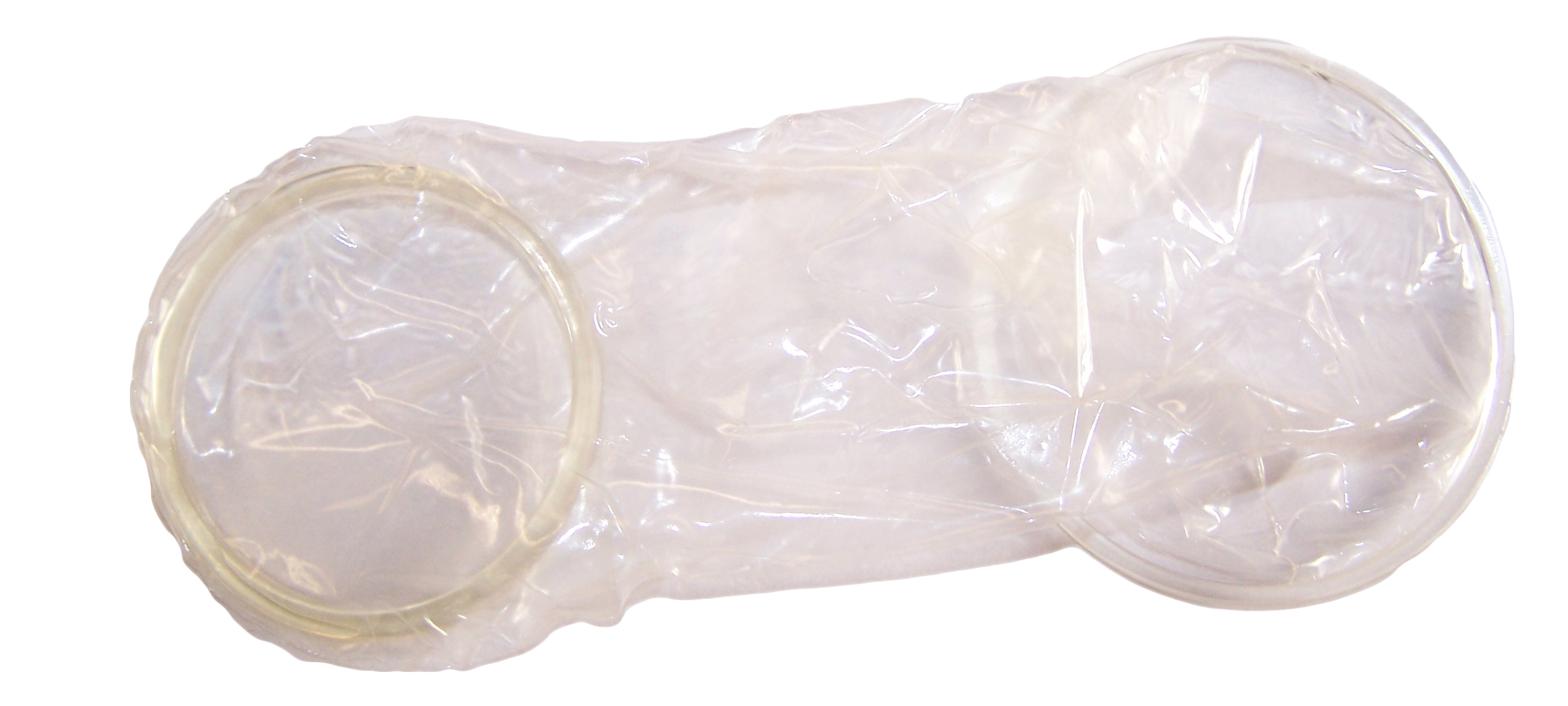
- Polyurethane female condom

Background
- Type: Barrier
- First use: 1990

Failure rates (first year)
- Perfect use: 5%
- Typical use: 21%

Usage
- Reversibility: Immediate
- User reminders: To avoid risk of incorrect use, read the instructions carefully prior to use.

Advantages and disadvantages
- STI protection: Yes
- Weight gain: No
- Benefits: No external drugs or clinic visits required

A female condom (also known as an internal condom) is a barrier device that is used during sexual intercourse as a barrier contraceptive to reduce the probability of pregnancy or sexually transmitted infection (STI). It is inserted in the vagina or anus before intercourse to reduce the risk of exposure to semen or other body fluids. The female condom was invented in 1990 by Danish physician Lasse Hessel, and approved for sale in the United States by the FDA in 1993. It was developed as an alternative to the older external condom, which is placed over the penis.

== Description ==
The female condom is a thin, soft, loose-fitting sheath with a flexible ring/frame or ring/foam disc at the closed end. They typically come in various sizes. For most vaginas, a moderately sized condom is adequate; those who have recently given birth should try a large size first. The inner ring or foam disc at the closed end of the sheath is used to insert the condom inside the vagina and to hold it in place during intercourse. The rolled outer ring or poly frame at the open end of the sheath remains outside the vagina and covers part of the external genitalia.

The female condom was developed in the late 20th century, while male condoms have been used for centuries. A primary motive for its creation is the refusal of some men to use a condom because of loss of sensation and the resulting impact on the hardness of the man's erection, and secondarily by its implication that the male could transmit an STI.

== Versions and materials ==
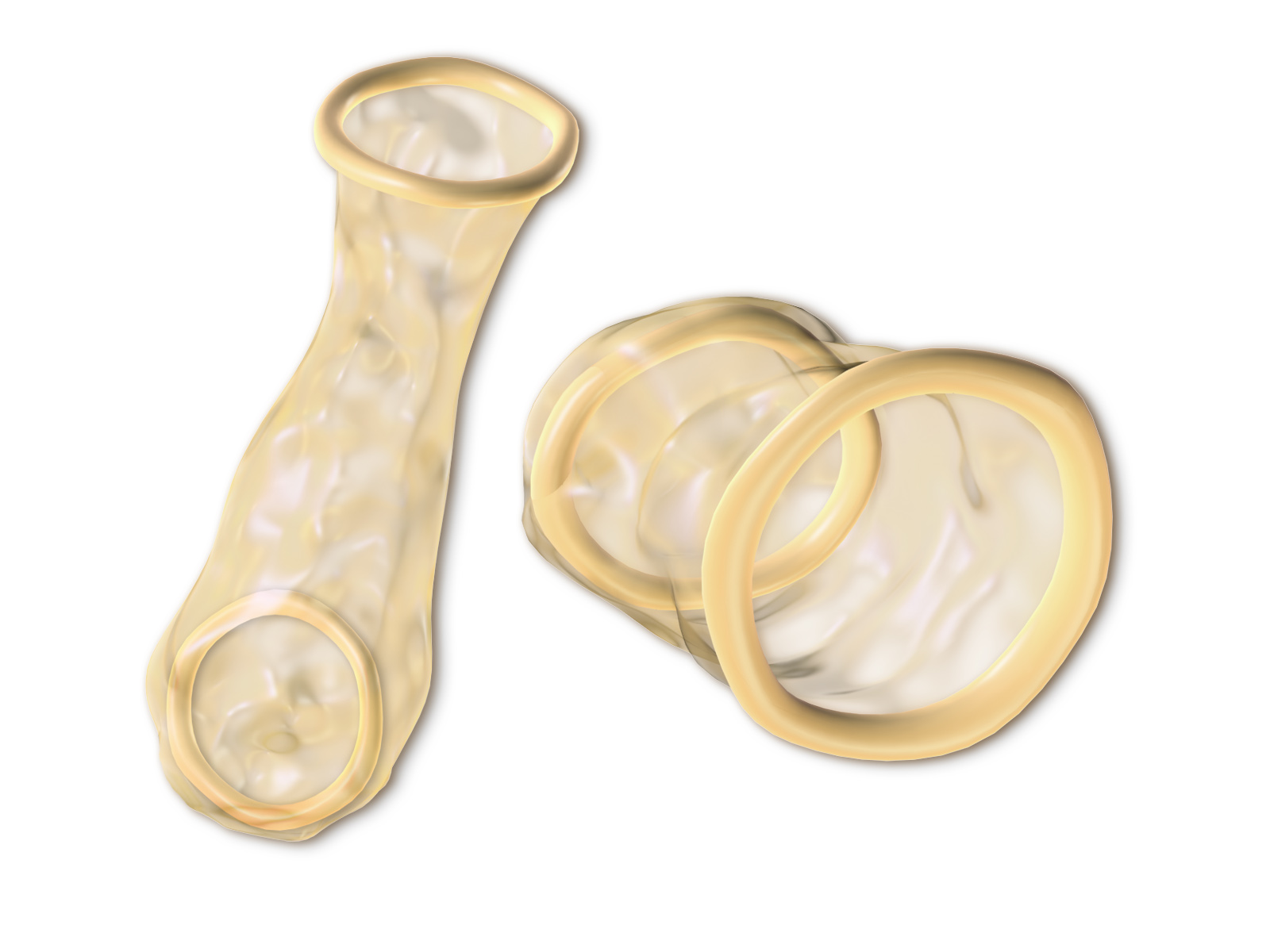
An illustration of a female condom

The FC1 female condom was first made from polyurethane. The second generation female condom is called the FC2 and is made from nitrile synthetic rubber (this material change was announced in September 2005, and full transition of the product line to FC2 was done by October 2009). The newer nitrile condoms are less likely to make potentially distracting crinkling noises. FC2 was developed to take the place of FC1, providing the same safety and efficacy during use, but at a significantly lower cost. FC2 is manufactured by Veru Pharma. The World Health Organization (WHO) has cleared FC2 for purchase by United Nations agencies and the United Nations Population Fund has incorporated the female condom into national programming. They are sold under many brand names, including Reality, Femidom, Dominique, Femy, Myfemy, Protectiv and Care.

FC2 is currently the only female condom with Food and Drug Administration (FDA) approval in the United States. It was initially available over the counter, but in 2018, Veru switched to a prescription model because of poor sales, so female condoms are no longer available OTC in American pharmacies.

A recent version of the female condom is made from natural latex, the same material used in male condoms. This condom does not make the noises some experience with plastic condoms and fits snugly against the female anatomy. This type of female condom is manufactured by HLL Lifecare Ltd., India and IXu LLC of USA. It is sold under the brand name VA w.o.w Condom Feminine. One more clinical trial is required before it can be considered for FDA approval in the United States.

The global health nonprofit PATH has also developed a female condom tailored for use in developing countries. The Woman's Condom is manufactured by Shanghai Dahua Medical Apparatus in China and is in early introduction.

== FC2 condoms ==
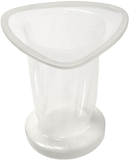
VA wow brand female condom

The FC2 female condom is a nitrile sheath or pouch 17 cm (6.7 in) in length. At each end there is a flexible ring. At the closed end of the sheath, the flexible ring is inserted into the vagina to hold the female condom in place. The other end of the sheath stays outside the vulva at the entrance to the vagina. This ring acts as a guide during penetration and stops the sheath from shifting during intercourse. There is a silicone-based lubricant on the inside of the condom, but additional lubrication can be used. The condom does not contain spermicide.

=== VA W.o.W. ===
The VA w.o.w. Condom Feminine is manufactured by HLL Lifecare Ltd. and IXu LLC. This latex condom has a pouch attached to its rounded triangular opening and a sponge to secure it inside a woman's vagina. It is available through the distributor IXu LLC for the private and public sectors in several regions, including the EU, South Africa, Brazil, and India. The VA w.o.w. received the CE mark, a certification that it meets European Union consumer health requirements. It is also under review by the WHO.

=== The Woman's Condom ===
The Woman's Condom, developed by PATH, through a user-centered design process, is a new female contraceptive designed for improved acceptability, ease of use, and good sensation. The Woman's Condom is a polyurethane pouch that is partially enclosed in a capsule to aid insertion. The capsule dissolves quickly after insertion in the vagina, which releases the pouch. The condom is then held stable by foam pads. The Woman's Condom is packaged dry and comes with a small sachet of water-based lubricant to be applied at point of use. PATH licensed manufacturing and distribution of the Woman's Condom to the Shanghai Dahua Medical Apparatus Company in 2008. Dahua has received the South Africa Bureau of Standards (SABS) certification marking (2013), Shanghai Food and Drug Administration Approval (2011), and the CE Mark approval (2010) for the Woman's Condom, which allows for marketing and distribution of the product in South Africa, China and Europe, respectively. The Woman's Condom is currently under review by the WHO/United Nations Population Fund Technical Review Committee; the committee's approval could lead to bulk public-sector purchase by United Nations agencies.

=== Natural Sensation Female Condom ===
The Natural Sensation Panty Condom is distributed in the US exclusively by the ACME Condom Company. It is manufactured by Natural Sensation Compañia Ltda. (NS) based in Bogotá, Colombia. The product is made of a polyethylene resin, which is stronger and thinner than latex. Unlike latex, polyethylene is anti-allergenic, ultra sensitive, transparent and odorless. Natural Sensation's condoms are lubricated and may be used with either oil- or water-based lubricants.

=== Silk Parasol Female Condom ===
The Female Panty Condom is manufactured by Silk Parasol. It is made of biodegradable latex. It has not yet been approved by the FDA and is currently undergoing clinical trials.

=== The Phoenurse Female Condom ===
The Phoenurse is made of a dumbbell-shaped polyurethane sheath and comes with an insertion tool, a water- or silicone-based lubricant, sanitary towels, and disposal bags. It is manufactured by the Tianjin Condombao Medical Polyurethane Tech. Co. Ltd. and is approved for sale in the European Economic Area. The Phoenurse female condom is also available in Brazil, Sri Lanka, China, Kenya, and Mexico. It has not been approved by the FDA.

=== Cupid's Female Condom ===
The Cupid's Female Condom is made of natural latex rubber and manufactured in India by Cupid Ltd. It is approved for distribution in Europe and was prequalified for distribution by WHO in 2012. It is currently undergoing clinical trials to gain approval by the FDA.

=== Origami Female Condom ===
The ORIGAMI Female Condom (OFC) is fabricated in molded silicone for anatomical conformity. It was validated as 100% biocompatible and non-allergenic in independent pre-clinical lab testing. The condom is not yet approved for sale and must be reviewed by the WHO, the C-Mark (EU), and the FDA to meet regulatory safety requirements. Large-scale clinical trials were to follow in 2014, to evaluate its performance and safety. It had been expected to reach the market in late 2015, pending regulatory pre-market approvals. As of January 2017, no results were available from initial feasibility studies. A pending lawsuit involving allegations of embezzlement means that the Origami is, as of February 2017, suspended indefinitely from reaching the market.

== Costs and "reuse" of the original FC and FC2 ==
The per unit price of female condoms is higher than male condoms but there is some evidence to suggest that polyurethane female condoms can be washed, disinfected, and reused.

Re-using the polyurethane female condom is not considered as safe as using a new one; however, the WHO says

Batches of new, unused female condoms were subjected to seven cycles of disinfection, washing, drying and re-lubrication, reflecting the steps and procedures in the draft protocol, but at considerably higher concentrations of bleach and for longer durations. All female condom batches met the manufacturing quality assessment specifications for structural integrity after the test cycles. ... Disinfection, washing, drying, re-lubrication and reuse of the device were not associated with penile discharge, symptomatic vaginal irritation or adverse colposcopic findings in study volunteers.

A presentation at the 1998 International AIDS conference concluded that "washing, drying and re-lubricating the female condom up to ten times does not significantly alter the structural integrity of the device. Further microbiological and virological tests are required before re-use of the female condom can be recommended."

Research suggests that the FC2 female condoms are a cost-effective method of HIV prevention even at low levels of use. The data shows that the cost-effectiveness would increase significantly at higher levels of use. A study conducted in 2005 by David Holtgrave, Chair of the Department of Health, Behavior and Society at Johns Hopkins University's Bloomberg School of Public Health, examined the projected public health impact that the FC2 female condom would have at different levels of use in two developing countries: South Africa and Brazil. The study concluded that FC2 use would generate significant cost savings at all levels of implementation by preventing thousands of HIV infections and saving millions of dollars in health care costs. There is some evidence to suggest that the effectiveness of internal condoms in preventing transmission of HIV may be similar to that of male condoms.

== Lubrication ==
As with all barrier contraceptives, water or silicone-based lubricants are safe to use with any female condom. Oil should not be used with a female condom made of latex.

The FC2 Female Condom comes pre-lubricated with a non-spermicidal, silicone based lubricant. The FC2 is made of nitrile so oil-based (or water-based) lubricants can be added on the inside and outside of the FC2 Female Condom or on the penis.

== Effectiveness ==
When used correctly, the female condom has a 5% failure rate. Inconsistent or incorrect usage has been shown to result in a 21% failure rate.

Some benefits of female condoms over other methods of birth control include:

- they allow women to share in the responsibility of preventing STIs
- they are safe to use for people with a latex allergy
- they can be used with both water-based lubricants and (unlike latex condoms) with oil-based lubricants
- they have no effect on a woman's natural hormone levels
- they may enhance sex and sexual play for both partners—the condom's external ring may stimulate the clitoris and/or penis during vaginal intercourse
- they are not dependent on a male partner to maintain his erection in order to stay in place

Some disadvantages to the female condom include:

- it may cause irritation of the genital area in people of both sexes (including irritation of the vagina, vulva, penis, or anus)
- it may slip into the vagina or anus during vaginal or anal intercourse
- it may reduce sensation during intercourse

== Advantages ==
FC2 Female Condom gives women control and choice over their own sexual health; women can protect themselves when their partner does not want to use a male condom; female condoms may provide enhanced sensation for men as compared to male condoms; FC2 is hypo allergenic and is safe to use with people who are allergic to rubber latex; FC2 may be inserted hours before intercourse; female condoms are not dependent on the penis being erect for insertion and does not require immediate withdrawal after ejaculation; FC2 is not tight or constricting; FC2 is highly lubricated and the material warms to body temperature.

The external genitals of the wearer and the base of the penis of the inserting partner may be better protected (from skin-to-skin transmitted STIs such as herpes and HPV) than when the male condom is used.

== Worldwide use ==
Sales of female condoms have been low in developed countries, though developing countries are increasingly using them to complement already existing family planning and HIV/AIDS programming. Probable causes for poor sales are that inserting the female condom is a skill that has to be learned and that female condoms can be significantly more expensive than male condoms (upwards of 2 or 3 times the cost). Also, reported "rustling" sounds from the original version of the female condom during intercourse turn off some potential users, as does the visibility of the outer ring which remains outside the vagina. Regulatory issues have also limited interest in manufacturing female condoms. In the United States, the FDA historically categorized female condoms as Class III medical devices, a category with more stringent requirements than Class II, which includes external condoms. Following proposals to reclassify female condoms, the FDA announced in 2018 that single-use female condoms would now be known as single-use internal condoms, and moved to Class II.

In November 2005, the World YWCA called on national health ministries and international donors to commit to purchasing 180 million female condoms for global distribution in 2006, stating that "Female condoms remain the only tool for HIV prevention that women can initiate and control," but that they remain virtually inaccessible to women in the developing world due to their high cost of 72¢ per piece. If 180 million female condoms were ordered, the price of a single female condom was projected to decline to 22¢.

In 2005, 12 million female condoms were distributed to women in the developing world. By comparison, between 6 and 9 billion external (male) condoms were distributed that year.

== Awareness and access ==
Recently, a number of initiatives have been undertaken by international and intergovernmental organizations to expand access to the female condom. In 2012, the United Nations Commission for Lifesaving Commodities for Women and Children (UNCoLSC) endorsed female condoms as one of its 13 Life-Saving Commodities, catalyzing inter-organizational efforts to overcome several commodity-specific barriers currently inhibiting women in the developing world from benefiting from this product.

Price has been one of the key obstacles in expanding access to female condoms on an international level. female condoms cost, on average, US$2–4, depending on local market factors. At the 2012 Family Planning Summit in London, the Female Health Company pledged to increase access to the FC2 female condom for the world's poorest countries and announced a prospective pricing arrangement based on aggregate purchases and five percent free goods based on the prior year's purchases, together with a multiyear agreement to provide $14 million in training and education by FHC over the next six years.

The Cupid female condoms have been sold in Kyrgyz Republic through UNFPA for their public distribution system. The Woman's Condom has been sold to the public sector in China. Globally, it is acknowledged that further price reductions are necessary to achieve universal access to female condoms. Based on market analysis it is expected that sustainable price reductions are feasible.

== Campaigns ==
=== Prevention Now! ===
The Center for Health and Gender Equity's Prevention Now! Campaign promotes the use of external and female condoms as a means of preventing the spread of HIV/AIDS; reducing instances of unintended pregnancy, unsafe abortion, and other unsafe outcomes of unprotected sexual intercourse; promote the sexual and reproductive health and rights of all persons; and expand choices for those living with HIV/AIDS.

=== Put a Ring on It! ===
The Chicago Female Condom Campaign is a coalition of HIV/AIDS, reproductive justice, women's health, and gay men's health organizations dedicated to increasing access, affordability, availability, awareness, and utilization of female condoms. Lead partners include the AIDS Foundation of Chicago, Chicago Women's AIDS Project, Illinois Caucus for Adolescent Health, Pediatric AIDS Chicago Prevention Initiative, Mujeres Latinas en Accion, and Planned Parenthood of Illinois.

== See also ==
- Reproductive Health Supplies Coalition
