= Lasse Hessel =

Danish doctor, inventor, and author (1940–2019)

Lasse Leif Hessel (9 September 1940 – 25 April 2019), also known as "the family doctor", was a Danish inventor, author, and M.D. noted for such inventions as the Femidom and the Femi-X pill, and an internationally acknowledged expert on nutrition and dietary fibre.

== Biography ==
He studied medicine at the University of Copenhagen, and in the early 1970s began to collect research data on public health and nutrition for the Danish government.

This led to writing a medical column for the daily newspaper Politiken and serving as nutrition advisor for the Danish bread manufacturer Schulstad, an assignment which resulted in bread with more fiber.

He also produced a government-sponsored, educational TV series, Sund og slank (healthy and slim) in 1974, accompanied by a book of the same name, which sold 750.000 copies, his first huge publishing success. Later followed many more books, including several best-sellers, and a health magazine, Lev vel (live well) (1977).

In 1976, Hessel developed a trimness-pill called Fiber Trim, followed ten years later by his diet-pill Gastrolette, later marketed as Minus Calories and Zotrim.

In 1975, Hessel started The Family Doctor, a newspaper cartoon inspired by his experiences as a GP. The series was syndicated by The New York Times to newspapers and magazines in 42 countries. It reached a daily readership in excess of 320 million, ran for 14 years and made Lasse Hessel internationally famous.

Hessel's best-known invention is probably the Femidom, also called the female condom. He developed it after hearing about the lack of options available for women trying to avoid HIV/AIDS. It launched in Europe in 1990 and was approved by the FDA for sale in the United States in 1993. Today, its production is sponsored by World Health Organization and the United Nations. In 2000, the success of the Femidom was recognized with the Queen's Awards for Enterprise in the international trade category.

In 1991, Hessel published a bestselling book and videotape called Window on Love, based on his research with ultrasound scans, which he used to study how the penis moves inside the woman's pelvis during sexual intercourse. The book demonstrates how the penis can stimulate various sensitive areas of the vagina, leading to a more satisfying sex life. It was published in several languages and was followed by a whole series of health books on sexually related subjects such as safe sex, sensual massage, etc.

Another invention, the Femi-X pill, is a sort of Viagra for women suffering from sexual dysfunction. It was developed in cooperation with King's College and launched worldwide in 2004. Based on a mixture of herbal ingredients, the Femi-X pill allegedly enhances the female libido by stimulating blood flow and natural brain activity. It was accompanied by an educational DVD, Femi-X and Beyond (2004), hosted by Danish sexologist Joan Ørting.

Other systems invented by Hessel include the Aqua Wall (1978), an indoor waterfall designed to improve the environmental condition; a remover of insect poison; a remover of pimples; Cellastic (1986), a protective material based on human cell structure; the Bio Tap, a titanium ring system for secure attachment of stoma bags; the DiaTest saliva collection kit; and the DiaQuick, a diagnostic system for early detection of breast cancer.

Towards the end of his life, Hessel ran his own research company, Medic House, based in Denmark, and was co-owner of Natures Remedies, a company in London, while living with his wife and four children in the small Danish harbor town Svendborg.

Hessel died in Svendborg, Denmark on April 25, 2019.

== Bibliography ==
- Lasse Hessel: Sund og slank (1974)
- Lasse Hessel: The Family Doctor (1975)
- Lasse Hessel: Slank med fiber (1990)
- Lasse Hessel: Kærlighedens vindue aka Window on Love (1991)
- Lasse Hessel: Graviditet og fødsel (1991)
- Lasse Hessel: Skadestuen (1992)
- Lasse Hessel: Hvad er fibre? (1992)
- Lasse Hessel: Kærlighedens signaler (1992)
- Lasse Hessel: Alkohol og dit helbred (1992)
- Lasse Hessel: Maveproblemer (1992)
- Lasse Hessel: Stress (1992)
- Lasse Hessel: Mavesår (1992)
- Lasse Hessel: Akupunktur (1992)
- Lasse Hessel: Medicin - virkning og bivirkninger (1993)
