= David Noel Bourke =

Independent filmmaker

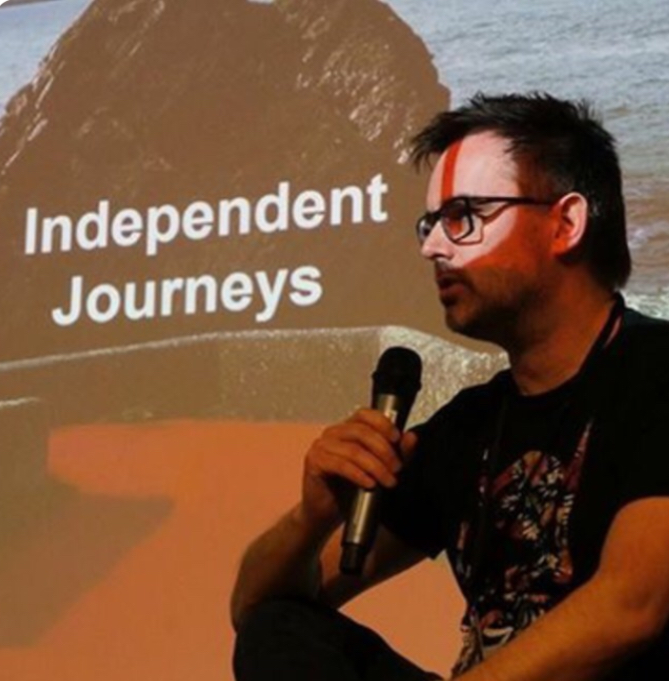
- David Noel Bourke at a film festival panel in Ireland
- Born: David Noel Bourke; 20 December 1970 (age 55); Limerick, Ireland

David Noel Bourke (born 20 December 1970) is an Irish independent filmmaker.

A writer, director, and editor, has made four independent feature films: Last Exit, No Right Turn, Bakerman and Vincent. These films have been launched around the world.

The latest feature film Bakerman was officially selected to screen at CPH:PIX, DIFF 2017, Filmfest Munich 2017, Scandinavian International Film Festival, Richard Harris International Film Festival and the Lund International Fantastic Film Festival and screened exclusively in NEW YORK at the Nordic International Film Festival where Bakerman's lead actor Mikkel Vadsholt won the Best Actor Award for the portrayal of the character Jens in the lead role.

The director announced in an interview with film magazine Cinema Scandinavia he is making a science fiction film, although next film is called Vincent, a coming-of-age mystery thriller.

== Background ==
Born to Irish parents, he grew up a big fan of cult, alternative movies. A spec screenwriter for many years, recently he has got more and more involved in the other processes of filmmaking including acting, shooting, editing and directing. The micro-budget movie Last Exit was his feature debut; very much an underground/exploitation movie and he admits, “not for everyone”, proved a surprise critical and financial success for such an experimental little movie and was distributed worldwide. After gaining more experience directing short movies and commercials, David’s second feature film released as writer and director the edgy retro-thriller "No Right Turn". His new film Bakerman is currently on a film festival tour with several official screenings already in 2017. Bakerman was developed from one of his previous projects called "White Pig". He also contributes as a columnist for Copenhagen Post newspaper, often detailing the challenges of making independent movies.

== Early cult films ==
The debut movie Last Exit, a low budget underground movie in 2003 which was officially released in the US and Europe. The more ambitious, retro-thriller called No Right Turn officially premiered at the CPH:PIX film festival 2009, where the film was nominated to screen twice in the new Danish Talent category. No Right Turn was officially released in the US and in Denmark and Sweden to critical acclaim.

== Bakerman (2016) ==
Bakerman, his third most accomplished independent feature film project, the gritty character drama had its world premier at Denmark's biggest film festival CPH:PIX 2016. The official Irish premier is Dingle International Film Festival (DIFF) 2017 where the director also participated in a special Independent Journey panel to discuss the making of this feature film along with other filmmakers.

Bakerman was officially selected at Filmfest Munich 2017, which after Berlinale is the biggest film festival in Germany the film participated in the international independents section of the festival program. In addition, the director was part of Filmmakers Live - a special filmmakers panels event which featured at the festival and included many notable filmmakers including Bryan Cranston and Sofia Coppola.

Other notable film festivals that invited the film for exclusive screenings include the Scandinavian International Film Festival, the Richard Harris International Film Festival and the Lund International Fantastic Film Festival where it was officially nominated Méliès d'argent Award for Best Feature Film.

In 2018, the director won the Best Foreign Film award for Bakerman at the Maryland International film festival.

== Personal life ==
He is married with two children.

== Filmography ==
=== Director ===
- Last Exit (2003)
- No Right Turn (2009)
- Bakerman (2016)
- Vincent (2022)

=== Screenwriter ===
- Last Exit (2003)
- No Right Turn (2009)
- Bakerman (2016)
- Vincent (2022)
- The Boy Who Stole The World (2023)

=== Film editor ===
- Last Exit (2003)
- No Right Turn (2009)
- Bakerman (2016)
