= Sssh.com =

Female erotica website

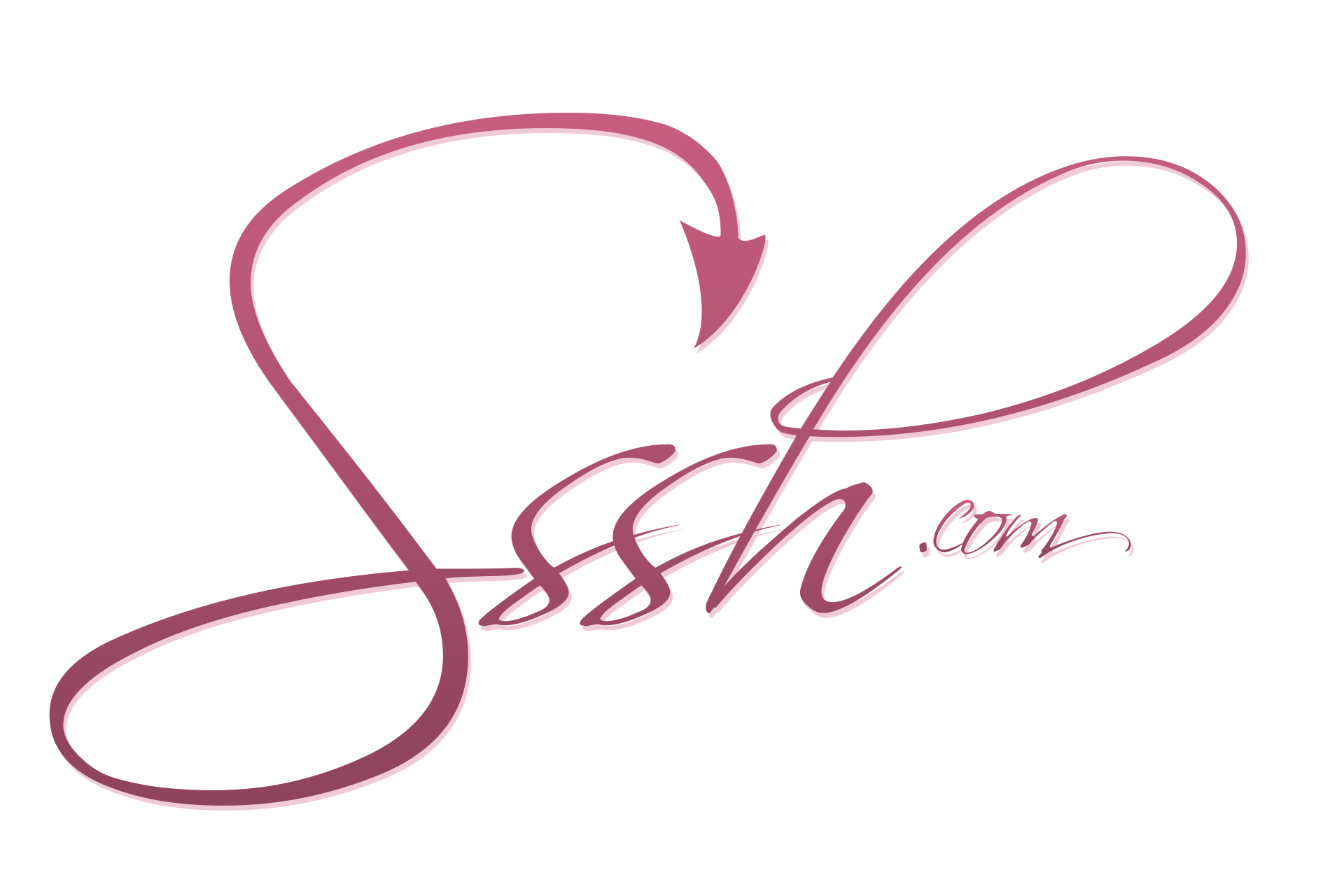
- Sssh.com Logo
- Industry: Women's erotica
- Founded: August 1, 1999; 27 years ago
- Area served: Worldwide
- Key people: Angie Rowntree (director, founder & CEO)
- Website: sssh.com

Sssh.com is an independent members-only female erotica site and the first "porn for women" website to be recognized by the mainstream adult industry, winning the XBIZ Award for Best Alternative Website.

== History ==
Sssh.com is a porn for women (feminist pornography) and erotica site that features original HD erotic movies, original novels, audio plays, radio stations, VR applications, live events, and more. The site is run by women for a female audience. The sites content, including its movies, have all been inspired by its members, via surveys, which has been continually running for seventeen years.

The focus of Sssh.com is on chemistry and mutual pleasure, with women in strong character roles taking control of their own pleasure. Founder Angie Rowntree said, "I launched Sssh.com in 1999, for a very simple reason: When I looked around the web at all the different porn sites, and looked around the adult video market at all the different titles and series, I didn't see much which would appeal to women."

At the 2013 Oscars, female nominees were given a free one-year VIP membership to the site as part of a gift bag.

== Selected productions ==
- Gone is a story about love and loss in small town America. Critic Rich Moreland stated, "Angie Rowntree and Sssh.com deserve congratulations for perhaps the most thoughtful and significant porn film this reviewer has ever seen. It stands alone in defining adult film as art." Madeline Blue was nominated for XBIZ's "Best Actress – Couples Release" for her role in the film.
- Ellington is a Cinderella story of Cindy Ellington, who is taken advantage of by her stepmother. Her college friend, Joe Prince, tries to help and a romance develops. The movie was featured on ABC's Nightline.

== Education ==
Mindbrowse.com and SexTalkTuesday.com are websites produced by Sssh.com founder Angie Rowntree.

Mindbrowse.com hosts a live streaming show where professionals in the adult industry talk about issues facing the industry. Past guests have included Nick Hawk, Cindy Gallop, Candida Royalle, Jacky St. James and Chauntelle Tibbals.

Sex Talk Tuesday features participants who share their thoughts and opinions on sex. Past guests have included comedian Margaret Cho, actress CoCo Brown, adult director Holly Randall, adult actress Kendra Sunderland, Gigolos actor Garen James, therapist Gloria Brame, sex educator Ducky DooLittle, adult actress Belle Knox, author Midori, and comedian Sara Benincasa.

== Media ==
Sssh.com founder Angie Rowntree is a frequent panel discussion participant at adult industry trade shows, and has been profiled by major media outlets including ABC's Nightline, Cosmopolitan, CNBC, Fox News, and Time Magazine, and Psychology Today.

== Awards and nominations ==
| Year | Ceremony | Result | Category |
|---|---|---|---|
| 2012 | AVN Award | Nominated | Best Alternative Website |
| 2012 | XBIZ Awards | Nominated | Specialty Site of the Year |
| 2013 | Sex Awards | Nominated | Hottest Sex Scene for Ellington |
| 2013 | Sex Awards | Nominated | Favorite Adult Website |
| 2013 | XBIZ Awards | Nominated | Specialty Site of the Year |
| 2014 | AVN Awards | Nominated | Best Specialty Site of the Year |
| 2014 | AVN Awards | Nominated | Best Web Release for Ellington |
| 2014 | XBIZ Awards | Nominated | Specialty Site of the Year |
| 2015 | XBIZ Awards | Nominated | Feminist Porn Release of the Year for Interlude |
| 2015 | XBIZ Awards | Won | Best Alternative Website |
| 2015 | AVN Awards | Nominated | Best Alternative Website |
| 2016 | XBIZ Awards | Nominated | Adult Site of the Year for Women |
| 2016 | XBIZ Awards | Nominated | Couples-Themed Release of the Year |
| 2016 | XBIZ Awards | Nominated | Marketing Campaign of the Year |
| 2016 | AVN Awards | Nominated | Best Drama for Gone |
| 2016 | AVN Awards | Nominated | Best Alternative Website |
| 2016 | CineKink Film Festival | —N/a | Gone Chosen as Official Selection |
| 2016 | Swedish International Film Festival | Nominated | Gone Chosen as Official Selection |
| 2016 | Los Angeles CineFest | Nominated | Gone Chosen as Official Selection |
