= Zentropa =

Danish film company

- Industry: Motion Picture
- Genre: Animation, comedy, drama
- Founded: 1992
- Founder: Lars von Trier and Peter Aalbæk Jensen
- Headquarters: Hvidovre, Denmark
- Key people: Anders Kjaerhauge (CEO)
- Products: Film
- Website: zentropa.dk

Zentropa, or Zentropa Entertainments, is a Danish film company started in 1992 by director Lars von Trier and producer Peter Aalbæk Jensen. Zentropa is named after the train company Zentropa in the film Europa (1991), which started the collaboration between von Trier and Jensen.

== History ==
It has produced over 70 feature films and has become the largest film production company in Scandinavia. It owns a number of subsidiary companies in Europe. Zentropa is also responsible for creating a large studio complex called Filmbyen (Film City), where both Zentropa and many other film-related companies are located.

Zentropa may be best known for creating the Dogme 95 movement, leading to such acclaimed films as Idioterne (1998), Festen (1998) and Mifunes sidste sang (1999).

In 1998, von Trier made history by having his company Zentropa to be the world's first mainstream film company to produce hardcore pornographic films, under the division Puzzy Power. Three of these films, Constance (1998), Pink Prison (1999), and the adult/mainstream crossover-feature All About Anna (2005), were made primarily for a female audience and were extremely successful in Europe, with the first two being directly responsible for the legalising of pornography in Norway in March 2006.

Women too like to see other people having sex. What they don't like is the endless close-ups of hammering bodyparts without a story. Von Trier is the first to have realised this and produced valuable quality porn films for women.

— Stern No. 40, 27 September 2007

Zentropa's initiative spearheaded a European wave of female-friendly porn films from directors such as Anna Span, Erika Lust and Petra Joy, while von Trier's company Zentropa was forced to abandon the experiment due to pressure from its English business partners. In July 2009, women's magazine Cosmopolitan ranked Pink Prison as No. 1 in its Top Five of the best women's porn, calling it the "role model for the new porn-generation".

== Sexual harassment allegations ==
In November 2017, in the wake of the Me Too movement, nine women – all former employees at Zentropa – spoke of an "ingrained" culture of abuse at the studio. Several of those interviewed said that their treatment had prompted them to stop working in the film industry altogether. Jensen, the company's co-founder, was specifically accused of sexual misconduct and sidelined from operations. An internal memo stated that he would no longer exercise "influence on the daily leadership of the company [and] will not partake in any management meetings." According to von Trier, Jensen stepped down and passed to Anders Kjaerhauge as CEO of Zentropa when the former's further allegations of harassment came to light.

== Selected productions ==
Work	Year	Director	Notes
Michael Laudrup: A football player	1993	Jørgen Leth	Documentary
Family Matters	1993	Susanne Bier	Feature
Pretty Boy (1993 film)	1993	Carsten Sønder	Feature
Bíódagar	1994	Friðrik Þór Friðriksson	Feature
The Kingdom	1994	Lars von Trier	Miniseries
Á köldum klaka	1995	Friðrik Þór Friðriksson	Feature
Pan	1995	Henning Carlsen	Feature
The Beast Within (1995 film)	1995	Carsten Rudolf	Feature
Love Me, Love Me Not (1995 film)	1995	Carsten Sønder	Feature
Carmen & Babyface	1995	Jon Bang Carlsen	Feature
The Eighteenth	1996	Anders Rønnow Klarlund	Feature
Harry & Sonja	1996	Björn Runge	Feature
The Greatest Heroes	1996	Thomas Vinterberg	Feature
Breaking the waves	1996	Lars von Trier	Feature
Portland	1996	Niels Arden Oplev	Feature
The Kingdom II	1997	Lars von Trier	Miniseries
Credo	1997	Susanne Bier	Feature
The Last Viking	1997	Jesper W. Nielsen	Feature
Love Fools	1998	Leif Magnusson	Feature
Constance	1998	Knud Vesterskov	Feature
I Wonder Who's Kissing You Now?	1998	Henning Carlsen	Feature
Pink Prison	1999	Lisbeth Lynghøft	Feature
Possessed (1999 film)	1999	Anders Rønnow Klarlund	Feature
A Summer Tale	2000	Ulf Malmros	Feature
Together	2000	Lukas Moodysson	Feature
The lady of Hamre	2000	Katrine Wiedemann	Feature
Miracle (2000 film)	2000	Natasha Arthy	Feature
Ikingut	2000	Gísli Snær Erlingsson	Feature
The King Is Alive	2000	Kristian Levring	Feature
Italian for Beginners	2000	Lone Scherfig	Feature
HotMen CoolBoyz	2000	Knud Vesterskov	Feature
The Dog Hotel	2000	Per Åhlin	Animated feature
The Bench	2000	Per Fly	Feature
Dancer in the dark	2000	Lars von Trier	Feature
Foreign Fields	2000	Aage Rais-Nordentoft	Feature
D-Dag	2001	Lars von Trier, Kristian Levring, Søren Kragh-Jacobsen, Thomas Vinterberg	TV film
Chop Chop	2001	Niels Arden Oplev	Feature
One-Hand Clapping	2001	Gert Fredholm	Feature
Truly Human	2001	Åke Sandgren	Feature
House of Hearts	2002	Elisabeth Rygaard	Feature
Minor Mishaps	2002	Annette K. Olesen	Feature
Charlie Butterfly	2002	Dariusz Steiness	Feature - Charlie Butterfly in the Danish Film Database
Dogville	2003	Lars von Trier	Feature
Sea of Silence	2003	Stijn Coninx	Feature
The Five Obstructions	2003	Lars von Trier and Jørgen Leth	Feature
Strings	2004	Anders Rønnow Klarlund	Animated feature
South (2004 film)	2004	Martin Koolhoven	Feature
Brothers	2004	Susanne Bier	Feature
When Children Play in the Sky	2005	Lorenzo Hendel	Feature - Den sidste åndemaner in the Danish Film Database
Manderlay	2005	Lars von Trier	Feature
All About Anna	2005	Jessica Nilsson	Feature
Snuppet	2006	Martin Vrede Nielsen	Feature
The Boss of it All	2006	Lars von Trier	Feature
Råzone	2006	Christian E. Christiansen	Feature
The Early Years: Erik Nietzsche Part 1	2007	Jacob Thuesen	Feature
At Night	2007	Christian E. Christiansen	Short fiction
Echo	2007	Anders Morgenthaler	Feature
How to Get Rid of Others	2007	Anders Rønnow Klarlund	Feature
Island of Lost Souls	2007	Nikolaj Arcel	Feature
Little Soldier	2008	Annette K. Olesen	Feature
Fear Me Not	2008	Kristian Levring	Feature
Oneway-ticket to Korsør	2008	Gert Fredholm	Feature
Go with peace Jamil	2008	Omar Shargawi	Feature
Zoomers	2009	Christian E. Christiansen	Feature
Metropia	2009	Tarik Saleh	Animated feature
Mammoth	2009	Lukas Moodysson	Feature
Love & Rage (2009 film)	2009	Morten Giese	Feature
The Blessing	2009	Heidi Maria Faisst	Feature - The Blessing in the Danish Film Database
Antichrist	2009	Lars von Trier	Feature
Klown	2010	Mikkel Nørgaard	Feature
Berik	2010	Daniel Borgman	Short fiction
Nothing's All Bad	2010	Mikkel Munch-Fals	Feature
Donkeys	2010	Morag McKinnon	Feature
Truth About Men	2010	Nikolaj Arcel	Feature
In a Better World	2010	Susanne Bier	Feature; Won the Academy Award for Best International Feature Film
A Family	2010	Pernille Fischer Christensen	Feature
The Woman That Dreamed About a Man	2010	Per Fly	Feature
The Red Chapel	2010	Mads Brügger	Documentary
Erotic Man	2010	Jørgen Leth	Feature - Erotic Man in the Danish Film Database
ID A	2011	Christian E. Christiansen	Feature
Love Is in the Air	2011	Simon Staho	Feature
Vlogger	2011	Ricard Gras	Machinima; produced as Zentropa International Spain
Rebounce	2011	Heidi Maria Faisst	Feature
Melancholia	2011	Lars von Trier	Feature
Perfect Sense	2012	David Mackenzie	Feature
Love Is All You Need	2012	Susanne Bier	Feature
The Secret Society of Fine Arts	2012	Anders Rønnow Klarlund	Feature
A Royal Affair	2012	Nikolaj Arcel	Feature
A Caretaker's Tale	2012	Katrine Wiedemann	Feature
Nymphomaniac	2013	Lars von Trier	Feature
The Keeper of Lost Causes	2013	Mikkel Nørgaard	Feature - The Keeper of Lost Causes in the Danish Film Database
The Hunt	2013	Thomas Vinterberg	Feature
The Salvation	2014	Kristian Levring	Feature
The Absent One (2014 film)	2014	Mikkel Nørgaard	Feature
On the Edge (2014 film)	2014	Christian E. Christiansen	Feature
A Second Chance	2014	Susanne Bier	Feature
Vitello Dugs a Hole	2015	Dorte Bengtson	Animated short feature
The Model	2015	Mads Matthiesen	Feature - The Model in the Danish Film Database
The Day Will Come	2016	Jesper W. Nielsen	Feature
Vitello	2018	Dorte Bengtson	Animated feature
The House That Jack Built	2018	Lars Von Trier	Feature
Journal 64	2018	Christoffer Boe	Feature
The Other Lamb	2019	Małgorzata Szumowska	Feature
Monty and the Street Party	2019	Anders Morgenthaler, Mikael Wulff	Animated feature
Hope	2019	Maria Sødahl	Feature
Sweat	2020	Magnus von Horn	Feature
Riders of Justice	2020	Anders Thomas Jensen	Feature
Another Round	2020	Thomas Vinterberg	Feature; Won the Academy Award for Best International Feature Film
Rushed	2021	Vibeke Muasya	Feature
The Kingdom Exodus	2022	Lars Von Trier	Miniseries
Forever	2022	Frelle Petersen	Feature
Together 99 (Tillsammans 99)	2023	Lukas Moodysson	Feature film
Families Like Ours	2024	Thomas Vinterberg	Miniseries
Just Like Beauty	TBA	TBA	Feature

== Subsidiaries ==
- EF Rental
- Electric Parc
- Puzzy Power
- Trust Film Sales
- Zentropa Real
- Zentropa Interaction
- Zentropa Rekorder
- Zentropa Klippegangen
- Zentropa International Köln GmbH
- Zentropa International Poland
- Zentropa Netherlands
- Zentropa International Sweden

== Awards ==
Zentropa won awards and nominations from local ceremonies including Robert and Bodil, as well as two Academy Award for Best International Feature Film for In a Better World and Another Round, both were directed by Dogme 95-competitors Susanne Bier and Thomas Vinterberg.
