= Mathias Klenske =

Danish voice actor (born 1983)

- Born: 25 October 1983 (age 42); Copenhagen, Denmark
- Occupation: Actor
- Years active: 1994–present

Mathias Klenske (born 25 October 1983) is a Danish voice actor who is best known for his role as Adam in the film Frække Frida og de frygtløse spioner – an adaptation based on a series of books by Lykke Nielsen. Klenske regularly dubs characters that appear in cartoons, anime and video games. He is also well known to children in Denmark as the Danish voice of Ash Ketchum from the Pokémon anime. And does the voice of Jay in Ninjago in Danish. He is a member of the theater Hamlet Revyen.

Klenske works at Dubberman Denmark, SDI Media Denmark, and other Danish dubbing studios, where he carries out voice work.

== Biography ==
Mathias Klenske was born on 25 October 1983 in northern Copenhagen. He started voice acting when he was nine years old, voicing characters in the animated series Animaniacs. He played Adam in Frække Frida og de frygtløse spioner. Three years later, Klenske made a comeback to play Børnebisp in the film Alletiders Julemand.

== Roles ==
=== Live-action ===
- Adam in Frække Frida og de frygtløse spioner
- Børnebisp in Alletiders Julemand

== Dubbing roles ==
=== Anime and animation ===
- Chazz Princeton in Yu-Gi-Oh! GX
- Ash Ketchum, Paul (DP002), and Lance in Pokémon
- Ash Ketchum in Pokémon: The First Movie
- Ash Ketchum in Pokémon: The Movie 2000
- Ash Ketchum in Pokémon 3: The Movie
- Ash Ketchum in Pokémon 4Ever
- Ash Ketchum in Pokémon Heroes
- Ash Ketchum in Pokémon: Jirachi Wish Maker
- Ash Ketchum in Pokémon: Destiny Deoxys
- Ash Ketchum in Pokémon: Lucario and the Mystery of Mew
- Ash Ketchum in Pokémon Ranger and the Temple of the Sea
- Ash Ketchum im Pokémon: The Rise of Darkrai
- Ash Ketchum in Pokémon: Giratina and the Sky Warrior
- Ash Ketchum in Pokémon: Arceus and the Jewel of Life
- Ash Ketchum in Pokémon: Zoroark: Master of Illusions
- Ash Ketchum in Pokémon the Movie: Black—Victini and Reshiram and White—Victini and Zekrom
- Ash Ketchum in Pokémon the Movie: Kyurem vs. the Sword of Justice
- Ash Ketchum in Pokémon the Movie: Genesect and the Legend Awakened
- Ash Ketchum in Pokémon the Movie: Diancie and the Cocoon of Destruction
- Chris McClean in Total Drama Island
- Chris McClean in Total Drama Action
- Chris McClean in Total Drama World Tour
- Rolf and Jonny in Ed, Edd n Eddy
- Jack Spicer in Xiaolin Showdown
- Terry McGinnis in Batman Beyond
- Ron Stoppable in Kim Possible
- Fillmore in Fillmore!
- Benny in Lloyd in Space
- Robin in Teen Titans
- Johnny Test in Johnny Test
- Gorby in Finley The Fire Engine
- Kick Buttowski in Kick Buttowski: Suburban Daredevil
- Aerrow in Storm Hawks
- Rock Lee in Naruto
- Chavo in El Chavo Animado
- Chicken Little Cluck in Chicken Little (2005 film)
- Kenta Yumiya in Beyblade: Metal Fusion
- Vince LaSalle in Recess
- Numbuh One in Codename: Kids Next Door
- Steve in Blue's Clues
- The Nazz in Kitty Is Not a Cat

=== Live-action ===
- Additional voice in Alvin and the Chipmunks
- Additional voice in Babe
- Herbert in 101 Dalmatians
- Juni Cortez in Spy Kids 4: All the Time in the World
- Lou in Cats & Dogs
- Walter Flipstick in Buzz and Tell

=== Video games ===
- Spyro in The Legend of Spyro: Dawn of the Dragon
