= Jette Philipsen =

Danish cricketer

Personal information
- Full name: Jette Philipsen

International information
- National side: Denmark
- ODI debut (cap 26): 18 July 1995 v Ireland
- Last ODI: 20 December 1997 v West Indies

Career statistics
Competition	WODI
Matches	9
Runs scored	53
Batting average	5.88
100s/50s	0/0
Top score	16
Catches/stumpings	1/0
- Source: ESPNcricinfo, 28 September 2020

Jette Philipsen is a former women's cricketer for the Denmark national women's cricket team who played nine ODIs. She made her debut against Ireland during the 1995 Women's European Cricket Cup, when she scored 10 runs as a lower-order batsman. Two years later, she played five matches during the 1997 Women's Cricket World Cup. Her highest score in international cricket was 16 runs, which she scored twice; against both Pakistan and England. In all, she scored 53 runs and took one catch for Denmark. She represented Herning Cricket Club in domestic cricket.
