= Gry Bay =

Danish actress (born 1974)

- Born: Gry Wernberg Bay; 15 August 1974 (age 51); Frederiksberg, Denmark
- Occupation: Actress
- Partner: Jesper Bech Løkza
- Children: 1
- Website: grybay.com

Gry Wernberg Bay (born 15 August 1974) is a Danish actress. She is best known for her sexually provocative starring role in the feature film All About Anna (2005).

== Career ==
Gry Bay's first breakthrough role was a recurring part in the German RTL television series Dr. Monika Lindt – Kinderärztin, Geliebte, Mutter (1996), and afterwards appeared in the German TV-movie Hosenflattern (1998).

Back in Denmark, her first feature film starring roles were in the hip hop comedy Slim Slam Slum a.k.a. Joystick Nation (2002), for which she also composed several of the songs, and in David Noel Bourke's sexy, psychological thriller Last Exit (2003).

She then made headlines by landing the title role in Zentropa's sexually explicit romantic comedy All About Anna (2005), co-produced by Lars von Trier, for which she won the Scandinavian Adult Award as Best-Selling Scandinavian Star of 2006.

At the 2005 Venice Film Festival, Bay once more appeared nude in Pipilotti Rist's video installation Homo sapiens sapiens. She has since appeared in the feature films Betonhjerter (2005) and Grønne hjerter (2006).

In the 1990s, Bay appeared in stage musicals such as West Side Story, Grease, Guys and Dolls, Crazy for You and Me And My Girl, and at Copenhagen's Nørrebros Teater she played the part of Brooke Ashton in Michael Frayn's comedy Noises Off.

She was lead singer in the band XPY, with the remaining members of Crispy following Mette's exit.

== Personal life ==
Bay holds a master's degree in drama and music from University of Copenhagen. She has also studied mediumship and healing (Reiki 3, Eric Pearl, trance).

On 20 December 2009, Bay gave birth to a baby girl.

== Selected filmography ==
Year	Title	Role	notes
1996	Dr. Monika Lindt – Kinderärztin, Geliebte, Mutter (TV)	Svenja	
1998	Hosenflattern (TV)	Tove	
2001	Mistænkt	Mia Hviid	
2002	Slim Slam Slum	Dit	
2003	Last Exit	Tanya	
2004	Tro, had og kærlighed	Sonja	
2005	All About Anna	Anna	
2005	Betonhjerter	Massagepige	
2006	Emmalou	Carla	
2006	Grønne hjerter	Aisa	
