= Marcelle Perks =

British author and journalist

Marcelle Perks is a British author and journalist living in Germany.

She specializes in writing sexually themed guide books, but also writes short stories.

As a film journalist, she has contributed to such publications as British Horror Cinema, Fangoria, The Guardian and Kamera.

== Bibliography ==
- Incredible Orgasms: Yes, Yes, Yes, Yes, YESSS!! (2006)
- The User's Guide to the Rabbit (2006)
- Incredible Sex: 52 Brilliant Little Ideas to Take You All the Way (2006)
- The Little Book of Big O's: Brilliant Ideas to Take You to the Limit (2007)
- Secrets of Porn Star Sex: Brilliant Ideas for No-holds Barred Pleasure (2007)
- Bare Souls: tales of love, sex and death (2010)
