= Hawksworth (surname) =

Hawksworth is a surname. Notable people with the surname include:

- Blake Hawksworth (born 1983), major league pitcher for the St. Louis Cardinals
- David Leslie Hawksworth (born 1946), British mycologist and lichenologist
- Derek Hawksworth (1927–2021), footballer, who played for Sheffield United F.C.
- Ernest Hawksworth (1894–1961), English footballer
- Frederick Hawksworth (1884–1976), Chief Mechanical Engineer, Great Western Railway
- Jack Hawksworth (born 1991), English racing driver
- John Hawksworth (born 1961), English golfer
- Johnny Hawksworth (1924–2009), British musician and composer
- Tony Hawksworth (born 1938), English footballer
- William Hawksworth (1911–1966), New Zealand cricketer and doctor

== See also ==
- Walter Fawkes, né Hawksworth
