= Frække Frida og de frygtløse spioner =

- Movie poster
- Directed by: Søren Ole Christensen
- Written by: Søren Ole Christensen
- Produced by: Kenneth Madsen
- Starring: Anette Brandt; Mathias Klenske; Ida Kruse Hannibal; Gunilla Odsbøl
- Cinematography: Nicolaj Brüel; Henrik Ploug Christensen
- Edited by: Birger Madsen
- Music by: Søren Rasted; Claus Norreen
- Distributed by: Nordisk Film
- Release date: 18 March 1994
- Running time: 75 min.
- Country: Denmark
- Language: Danish

Frække Frida og de frygtløse spioner (English: Naughty Frida and the Fearless Spies), often shortened to simply Frække Frida, is a 1994 Danish children's film written and directed by Søren Ole Christensen. Christensen based the story on a series of children's books by Lykke Nielsen. Music for the film was written and performed by Søren Rasted and Claus Norreen who later teamed up with René Dif and Lene Nystrøm later in 1994 to form the bubblegum/eurodance music group, Joyspeed (later renamed to Aqua).

== Cast ==
Actor	Role
Anette Brandt	Frida
Mathias Klenske	Adam
Ida Kruse Hannibal	Desiré
Gunilla Odsbøl	Amalie
Arne Siemsen	Frida's father Poul
Charlotte Sieling	Frida's mother Jytte
Finn Nielsen	Richard Gunnersen
Axel Strøbye	Frida's grandfather Carl
Birgit Sadolin	Frida's grandmother
Jesper Klein	Park Ranger
Tom McEwan	Mr. Johnson
Morten Suurballe	Mr. Goldbody
Lisbet Lundquist	Neighbor
Paprika Steen	Lonni
Søren Hytholm Jensen	Johnny

== Soundtrack ==
Frække Frida og de frygtløse spioner

Soundtrack album by Soren Rasted and Claus Norreen
- Released: 1994
- Recorded: 1993
- Genre: Soundtrack
- Language: Danish

The producers Søren Rasted and Claus Norreen had won a contest and were hired to produce the soundtrack. For some of the songs they hired club DJ René Dif and, after getting along well, decided to work together again on a future project. The future project would be the formation of Aqua, with Lene Nystrøm as their lead vocalist.

=== Track titles ===
- De frygtløse spioner (featuring Thomas Skovgaard)
- Nattens fe (featuring Peter Smith)
- Frække Frida (featuring Annette Brandt, Mathias Klenske, Gunilla Odsbøl & Ida Hannibal Kruse)
- Si-bab-rapper-di-åhh (featuring Arne Siemsen, René Dif & Annette Brandt)
- Når jeg blir stor (featuring Alice Søndergård & Annette Brandt)
- Gunnersen (featuring Arne Siemsen)
- Godmorgen (featuring Thomas Skovgaard)
- Den magiske kasse (featuring Annette Brandt, Mathias Klenske, Gunilla Odsbøl & Ida Hannibal Kruse)
- Hele verden rundt (featuring Alice Søndergård)
- Ønskebrønd (featuring Peter Smith & Søren Rasted)
- Devil's child
- Flugten
- Si-bab-rapper-di-åhh (Dance Mix) (featuring Arne Siemsen, René Dif & Annette Brandt)
- Frække Frida (featuring Christine Havkrog)
