= Carl Th. Dreyer: My Metier =

- Directed by: Torben Skjødt Jensen
- Written by: Torben Skjødt Jensen; Prami Larsen; Lars Bo Kimergaard (idea)
- Produced by: Michael Brask
- Narrated by: Harald Paalgaard
- Cinematography: Torben Skjødt Jensen; Prami Larsen
- Edited by: Ghita Beckendorff
- Distributed by: The Criterion Collection (DVD)
- Release date: 28 December 1995
- Running time: 94 minutes
- Country: Denmark
- Language: Danish

Carl Th. Dreyer: My Metier (Danish: Carl Th. Dreyer: Min metier) is a 1995 Danish documentary film directed by Torben Skjødt Jensen about the film career of Carl Theodor Dreyer.
