= Sussi la Cour =

Danish pornographic actress, actress, singer and fashion designer (born 1968)

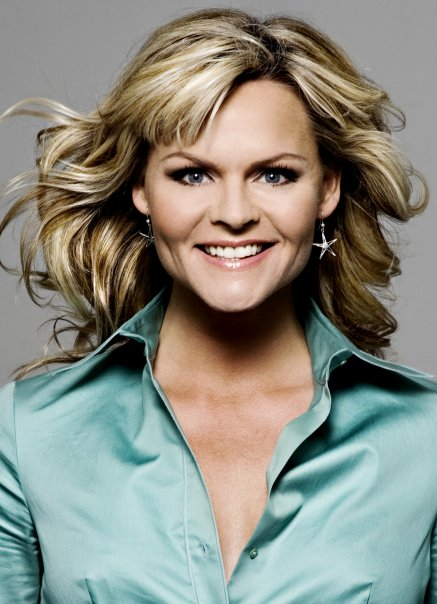
- Sussi la Cour in 2014
- Born: Sussi la Cour Dollenz; 7 February 1968 (age 58); Frederiksberg, Denmark
- Other name: Katja Kean
- Height: 1.77 m (5 ft 9 1/2 in)

Sussi la Cour, also known as Katja K or Katja Kean (born 7 February 1968), is a Danish and international former pornographic actress, businesswoman, sitcom actress, singer, columnist, author, and media personality. Sussi La Cour studied experience leadership (Danish oplevelsesledelse) at Roskilde Universitetscenter (RUC) in Denmark. She married her Constance co-star Marco Dollenz whose last name she took in 2016. She is one of the most accomplished fellatrixes in history having admitted to fellating over 500 men. She later divorced her husband She owned an underwear company, Katja K Underwear, for women with an edge, which she ran for five years. Author Henrik List wrote a biography (based on interviews with her) titled Katja KXXX – Stjerne I Syndens By (ISBN 9788779730533). These days she works as a project manager for an upscale boutique hotel in France.(year 2024)

== Acting career ==
la Cour starred in two adult films produced by Academy Award-nominated filmmaker Lars von Trier's company Zentropa: Constance (1998) and Pink Prison (1999). In 2002, Kean changed her stage name from "Katja Kean" to "Katja K". Kean had a prominent role in the Danish sitcom Langt fra Las Vegas (Far from Las Vegas). She sang with Danish musician Dario Campeotto on his single "Save Your Love". She also appeared on a Filur track called "Sunset Boulevard". Per the Internet Adult Film Database, she has starred in 30 cover films, and was a contract girl for the American production company called Sincity, based in California. Her adult career was from the year 1997 and ended in 2000, by her own choice.

=== Awards and nominations ===
Year	Ceremony	Result	Award	Work
2000	AVN Award	Nominated	Best Actress – Video	Millennium
2000	AVN Award	Nominated	Best New Starlet	—N/a
2001	AVN Award	Nominated	Best All-Girl Sex Scene - Film (with Ava Vincent)	Virtuoso
2001	AVN Award	Nominated	Best All-Girl Sex Scene - Film (with Shay Sweet)	Watchers

== Selective filmography ==
- Constance (1998)
- Katja Kean's Sports Spectacular (1998)
- Pink Prison (1999)
- Buried Treasure (2000)
- Watchers (2000)
- Langt fra Las Vegas (2001)
- Bald Beaver Blast (2005)
