= Schulstad =

Danish food manufacturer

Schulstad is a Danish food manufacturer, known for its bakery products; it is the main manufacturer of Danish pastry in the UK.

== History ==
The company was founded in 1880 in Denmark.

The company became part of a larger cooperative in 2003.

== Structure ==
The company is headquartered in Denmark.

=== United Kingdom ===
In the UK, the company has its main site in north Buckinghamshire.

== Products ==
It produces the three top-selling Danish pastry product types in the UK.

The Danish pastry industry is worth about £60m in the UK, around 69 million Danish pastries.

== See also ==
- Aryzta
