= Crispy (band) =

Danish eurodance group (1997–2001)

- Also known as: XPY (2000–2001)
- Origin: Copenhagen, Denmark
- Genre: Dance-pop
- Years active: 1997–2001
- Labels: Icebergs; RCA; Avex Trax; Gramophone
- Past members: Mads B.B. Krog; Gry Bay; Christian Møller; Mette Christensen

Crispy (later known as XPY) was a Danish Dance-pop trio that was formed in Copenhagen in 1997 by music producer Mads B.B. Krog and vocalists Christian Møller and Mette Christensen. Their most notable songs are "Secret" and"Licky Licky" from the 1998 album The Game. Three of their songs ("Bubble Dancer", "The Game" and "Kiss Me Red") were also featured in the four-panel dance game In the Groove.

Crispy's debut album, The Game, was recorded in 1997 and released the following year. The group was successful in Scandinavia and Asia, and was awarded the Pop Shop Award '98 for best Scandinavian debut release in 1998 among 15 nominees.

== Career ==
The trio was founded in 1997 by Mads B.B. Krog, featuring Mette and Christian as the vocalists. Crispy's first single, "Kiss Me Red", was released in February 1998 in Scandinavia, and enjoyed only moderate recognition at first. They released "Calendar Girl" in April. The single, "Licky Licky", was much more successful. The single "Love is Waiting" was released in May 1999. Crispy released their debut album, The Game, in mid-1998. Several editions of The Game were released, the most common being the release of 12 tracks. The group became well-established in the Danish dance-pop scene. At the end of 1998 Crispy went on a promotion tour in Japan, Singapore and the Philippines, and performed in Europe over the following year.

The group began preparing a second album around 1999, but it was scrapped due to vocalist Mette Christensen, who was weakened by a health problem and had to leave the group. In 2000, the group was restructured into a duo and the name was changed to "XPY". Danish singer and actress Gry Bay joined as the new vocalist alongside Mads. Under this new lineup, only two singles were released: "L/R" and "La Fiesta", both reaching the top 20 in Denmark. XPY came to a definitive end in 2001.

== Members ==
Former members

- Mads B.B. Krog (Copenhagen, born 9 June 1976) (1997–2001)
- Gry Bay (Frederiksberg, born 15 August 1974) (2000–2001)
- Christian Møller (Copenhagen, born 16 December 1974) (1997–2000)
- Mette Christensen (Copenhagen, 25 September 1976 – October 2005) (1997–2000)

== Discography ==
=== Albums ===
- The Game (1 June 1998)

=== Singles ===
Title	Year	Peak chart positions	Album
Title	Year	DEN	Album
"Kiss Me Red"	1998	–	The Game
"Licky Licky"	1998	–	The Game
"Love Is Waiting"	1998	–	The Game
"Calendar Girl"	1998	–	The Game
"Mr. Dinosaur"	1999	–	The Game
"DJ Santa"	1999	–	—N/a
"I Like..."	2000	–	—N/a
"In & Out"	2000	–	—N/a
as XPY			—N/a
"L/R"	2001	11	—N/a
"La Fiesta"	2001	18	—N/a
"—" denotes releases that did not chart
