= Petra Joy =

German film director and producer

- Born: 1964 (age 61–62); Kempten, West Germany
- Occupations: Film director, film producer, TV producer, distributor, author, and photographer.
- Known for: One of the pioneers in producing pornography for women
- Notable work: The Joy of Porn: My Life as Feminist Pornographer, Feeling it, not faking it!, Female Fantasies

Petra Joy (born 1964) is a German feminist film director, film producer, TV producer, distributor, author, and photographer. She lives in Brighton, England. Along with Candida Royalle, Annie Sprinkle, Maria Beatty, and others, she is one of the pioneers in producing pornography for women. Her genre is described as "art-core," meaning the focus is on sexuality from the female perspective, female pleasure, and creative, sensual play. Common themes in her erotic films include safe sex, men seen as sexual objects, female fantasies, and male bisexuality.

== Background ==
Joy holds a master's degree in Film History from the University of Cologne. In 1990, she wrote her thesis on the representation of female sexuality in Nazi films. After graduation, she moved to England, where she worked for 10 years as a freelance producer and director for German television. Joy has directed and produced over 70 documentaries for international TV stations such as Channel 4, National Geographic, and WDR. Since 1990, the main focus of her work has been lifestyle and sexuality. A recurring topic was sexuality from a female perspective. Starting in 1992, she produced segments for “Liebe Sünde”, a programme about sex airing on the German satellite station Vox/Pro7.

In 2003, Joy launched Strawberry Seductress, an intimate and creative erotic photo service for women and couples and film production company. In 2004, Joy filmed Sexual Sushi, her first alternative pornographic film for women. HarperCollins published her book How to Make Your Own Adult Video: The Couple’s Guide to Making Sensual Home Movies in 2006. She then shot Female Fantasies and Feeling it, not faking it!. In 2009, Joy established the Petra Joy Award, an international erotic film competition for first-time female directors. She runs “how to make your own creative porn” workshops and speaks on the subject of women and pornography across Europe. Joy curates and produces a feminist porn series called Her Porn and has shot a documentary called The Joy of Porn: My Life as a Feminist Pornographer.

== Erotic Film Production ==
Joy started producing and directing erotic films in 2004 with the aim to show a more accurate reflection of female sexuality than mainstream porn filmmakers. She works exclusively with amateur performers, with the intention of capturing real chemistry, always shows safe sex, and has a policy never to show acts that can be perceived as being degrading to women. In contrast to mainstream porn that often focuses on shots of genitalia, Joy focused on the faces of the performers. Authentic sex scenes, men as sex objects, elaborate costumes, and taboo themes such as females penetrating males, and male bisexuality often feature in her films.

Of her first erotic film, Sexual Sushi, one reviewer wrote, “Petra has achieved her aim of creating an antidote to ‘porn junk food’”.

She describes her inspiration as follows:

“... [C]ommercially successful porn does nothing for me: I want porn that stimulates the mind and feeds the soul. I want porn that is educational and inspirational. I want porn that is creative and kinky. And because I cannot find it anywhere, I make my own. I am a visual creature and enjoy expressing myself through photos and films that are very different from mainstream glamour photography and porn films.”

In 2009, she curated and produced the first installment of the Her Porn series with the aim of showing a variety of female erotic visions. Her Porn 2 is to be released in April 2010. She also acts as a distributor for other female directors.

Her films have been shown at New York City’s Cinekink festival, the pornfilmfest Berlin, and at the British Film Institute.

== The Petra Joy Award ==
The Petra Joy Awards were founded by Petra Joy in October 2009 to encourage first-time erotic female filmmakers and to help the genre of porn from a female perspective thrive. Sponsored by German personal lubricant manufacturer "pjur", the inaugural theme was “What is erotic to you?”. Submissions came from Australia, America, the Netherlands, England, Spain and Austria. The winning films premiered at the Movimento cinema in Berlin during Berlin's pornfilmfest. In addition to cash prizes, the winning films were included on the first volume of Joy's compilation of erotic female filmmakers Her Porn.

2009 Winners:

- First Prize - Louise Lush, “That’s What I Like”
- Second Prize - Lola Clavo, “La Lucha”
- Third Prize - Linsey Satterthwaite, “I Like It When”
- Special Jury Award - Cora Emens, “Cora’s Memoirs—The Rose”

== Professional honours and awards ==
- 2004 Erotic Award - Photographer of the Year
- 2007 FICEB Award - Best Softcore Film (Female Fantasies - Strawberries Seductress)
- 2008 UKAFTA - Best Softcore Film Production & Best Lighting (Sensual Seduction)
- 2008 eLine Award - Pioneering Achievements in Adult Films for Women
- 2008 Feminist Porn Award - Best Bi Scene (Female Fantasies)
- 2009 PorYes Award - Achievement Award

== Partial filmography ==
=== As director and producer ===
- The Joy of Porn: My Life as Feminist Pornographer (Documentary, 2009)
- Feeling it, not faking it! (Erotic Film, 2008)
- Female Fantasies (Erotic Film, 2006)
- Sexual Sushi (Erotic Film, 2004)

=== As curator and producer ===
- Her Porn, Volume 1 (International Feminist Porn Compilation, 2010)
- Her Porn, Volume 2 (International Feminist Porn Compilation, 2009)

=== As distributor ===
- Dirty Diaries (Swedish Feminist Porn Compilation, 2009)
- Free Love (Dir: Marianna Beck, USA, 2009)
