= Anders Rønnow Klarlund =

Danish author, director and screenwriter

Anders Rønnow Klarlund is a Danish author, director and screenwriter. Together with the Danish author Jacob Weinreich, they are known as A. J. Kazinski, and have published The Last Good Man and "The Sleep and The Death".

Born in 1971 in Denmark, at first he worked at a radiostation, and went on to become a television producer. He made the shortfilm Klondike right before directing his feature film debut, The Eighteenth, a film that earned him international acclaim. He also directed four episodes of the Danish series Taxa.

== Books ==
=== The Last Good Man by A. J. Kazinski ===
A. J. Kazinski is a pseudonym for Anders Rønnow Klarlund and Jakob Weinreich, they have published the book The Last Good Man (Den sidste gode mand, 2010). The book has been translated into: English, Italian, German, French, Dutch, Norwegian, Hungarian, Russian, Finnish, Swedish, Japanese, Korean, Spanish, Polish, Portuguese, Romanian, Greek, and Icelandic.

==== Awards ====
- "The 2011 French Prix Relay" – Novel of the Year
- "2011 Best First Novel, The Danish Academy of Crime Fiction" ISBN 978-1-4516-4075-5

=== De hengivne ===
"De hengivne" was Klarlunds' debut novel. It was published in Danish on 6 October 2009 ISBN 978-87-567-9332-2

== Feature films ==
=== The Eighteenth ===
- The Eighteenth was written and directed by Anders Rønnow Klarlund.

==== Awards ====
- The International critics’ award
- Best Film, Mannheim-Heidelberg International Filmfestival:
- Best Film, Nordic Filmdays: The Eighteenth
- Best Film, Valencia International Filmfestival: The Eighteenth

==== Additional information ====
- Original title: Den attende
- Year of publication: 1996
- Country of production: Denmark
- Director: Anders Rønnow Klarlund
- Manuscript: Anders Rønnow Klarlund
- Producer: Thomas Mai
- Cinematography: Eigil Bryld
- Music: Martin Klarlund

=== The Possessed ===
==== Additional information ====
- Director: Anders Rønnow Klarlund
- Original title: Besat
- Year of publication: 1999
- Country of production: Denmark/Norway

=== Strings ===
Trailer link here

==== Awards ====
- Best Children/Youth Film: Strings – Denmark 2006
- The Citizen Kane Award: Strings
- Meliés D'argent: Best Film: Strings
