= Porn for women =

Pornography aimed at female audiences

Porn for women or women's pornography is pornography aimed specifically at the female market, and often produced by women. It rejects the view that pornography is only for men, and seeks to make porn that women enjoy watching instead of what is being offered in male-centric mainstream pornography.

== Characteristics ==
In the 1980s, writer Susie Bright criticised "the tamer kinds of 'erotica'", and instead proposed that the kind of pornography that On Our Backs was producing should be called "women's pornography", admitting however that this "is a contradiction in terms for many people, so convinced are they that pornography represents the darker, gutter side of lust." In 2015, scholar and director Ingrid Ryberg said that feminist pornography is defined "less by specific content or style and more by the ways in which it is based on a political critique of and challenge to dominant notions of gender and sexuality and aims to empower women sexually."

The main purpose of women's pornography is creating pornography specifically for women. As a result, the focus emphasizes women as subjects of pleasure reaching real orgasms. Women's pornography audio emphasizes what is being felt; the use of the female voice to display pleasure enhances the performance of orgasms. The camera shots, such as close-ups of the face, also emphasize pleasure and emotion. Other camera shots that are sometimes used include angles that display the faces of the male performers, rather than just their penises, in attempt to eroticize the male body more. Showing more of the male bodies negates the objectification of the female body in typical porn.

Women's pornography pays special attention to the care of performers by ensuring their comfort and consent with their performance and performance partners. Director Erika Lust says mainstream porn is fake and "crappy", and she wants to show "real sex". One aim of producing pornography for women is to remove the portrayal of men slandering and disrespecting women during sex. The portrayals instead convey real connections and pleasure.

== Producers and directors ==
=== Erika Lust ===
Erika Lust is a feminist pornography director, producer, and screenplay writer. She is also the founder of Erika Lust Films. Lust got her start in directing and producing feminist adult films because she found mainstream porn "unrelatable, unimaginative, and unattractive", so she wanted to do something about it. In 2005, she began to film her series called XConfessions. Lust Productions subscribers submitted their fantasies to her and she picked two each month to film for her new series. She wants the viewer to see realistic scenarios, real characters, and real pleasure. Lust says an important component in feminist porn is consent and respect. She makes sure the actors want to participate and that they want to experience sexual arousal. Her films aim to demonstrate real passion and connection between the actors. Lust says, "We make love, not porn. And we do all this with a feminine, aesthetic and innovative approach."

=== Angie Rowntree ===
Angie Rowntree is a director, writer and producer of women's pornography who got her start in the 1990s, launching her flagship site, Sssh.com, in 1999. Of female porn directors, Rowntree says, "There may not be a lot of us, but we're passionate about what we do, and we're working hard every day to provide women with porn that does appeal to them." Rowntree said Sssh's mission is straightforward: "We want to create movies that our customers want to see and enjoy watching. The only real difference between what I do and what producers of 'typical' porn do is that I'm serving a different audience, and instead of assuming we know what they want to see, we ask them what they want to see."

=== Jacky St. James ===
Jacky St. James is a writer, producer, and director who has worked with Bellesa Films. She directed films for Bellesa House, an imprint of Bellesa Films where performers are allowed to choose their partners and clothing and perform without a script and without makeup. The project is open to anyone who is willing to perform, regardless of prior experience in the porn industry, gender, body type, race, or age. Real-life couples are also welcome to perform. Bellesa House was created with the intent to film passionate sex and to develop engaging storylines in pornographic film. St. James believes it is important to make female performers feel comfortable. She speaks out against the restrictiveness of free porn.

=== Tristan Taormino ===
Tristan Taormino is a writer, educator, speaker, pornographer and activist. She currently runs her own production company Smart Ass Productions, and previously worked with Vivid Entertainment. She previously told AVN that although she acknowledges that although her work is often labeled "porn for women", she prefers to think of it as made for anyone "who wants to see spontaneity, performers taking charge of the scenes, chemistry between players, and real female orgasms."

=== Inka Winter ===
Inka Winter is a feminist director, producer, screenplay-writer, trauma-informed intimacy counselor, and sex educator. She runs the independent, award-winning feminist porn ForPlay Films. She has also collaborated with Lust Cinema including on the multi-award-winning series Ashford Manor, as well as with porn studio Dorcel Vision. Winter grew up in the infamous Friedrichshof Commune, and as a child witnessed the effects of coercive sexuality detached from intimacy or emotional bonds. As an adult, Winter's work focuses specifically on giving agency to performers, nurturing emotional connection and genuine pleasure, and the possibility of sexual healing. She offers what she calls "holistic pornography", which includes mindfulness, self-acceptance, and educational offerings. Her work is characterized by lush production values, an unhurried, "real time" sexuality, and the diversity of female desire.

== Contrast to mainstream pornography ==
Mainstream porn does not show concern for the female performer's comfort or respect. Although the majority of porn audiences are male, more women (as well as some men) are opening up about their interest and how they would prefer porn that considers female viewers and is not as crude or rough as mainstream pornography. A number of women are dedicated to creating this alternative to mainstream porn. They care about making films that do not include lustful schoolgirls, naughty nurses, or "bad step-mom and daughter" relationships. They also banish stereotypes about women's sexuality and expectations surrounding body shape and size.

The ideology behind mainstream pornography is founded on a belief that sexual activity in a patriarchal society is intrinsically male and that male sexuality is naturally aggressive or destructive. It assumes that women cannot choose to be free participants in an industry whose purpose is to satisfy the male gaze and contributes to male aggression. Radical feminist scholar and writer Andrea Dworkin named male power as the "'raison d'être' of pornography", as well as stating that pornography in itself is a means for expressing male power, in her 1981 book Pornography: Men Possessing Women.

Women's pornography is produced and directed by women, and it is intended for the female audience. One of its goals is to produce something that the customers want to see and will enjoy. This type of pornography is a minority on the Internet, but it is considered high-quality pornography by women. It is a common misconception for people to assume that women are not as easily aroused by sexually explicit images as men. Women who produce pornography believe that male-produced pornography ignores the sexuality of women and objectifies them. Anti-pornography feminists believe that the solution to this is to abolish pornography, but pro-pornography feminists think the solution is to create porn that attends to women's sexuality.

Pornography produced by women is placed in the category "romance" by the Adult Video News (AVN) awards. This category was added to the AVN awards in 2010. The AVN awards are movie awards that recognize writers, directors, and producers for their achievements in the creation of American pornographic films. Women's porn directors focus on different styles, but pay particular attention to the actual story, the actors, music, locations, and aesthetics of the scenes. The directors' main concern is making sure women enjoy the porn by making it realistic.

== Reactions ==
Pornography stars have differing views on the idea of women's pornography. Some performers say there are problems in the industry. Because of this, they decide to direct pornography themselves. Madison Young feels that most mainstream adult film videos lack substance and send confusing and potentially harmful signals about sex and body image to viewers. She includes verbal consent, body positivity, and inclusiveness in all of her work.

Other performers do not see need for a specific type of porn just for women. Porn star James Deen said, "Why is there porn explicitly only for women? By saying there needs to be porn for women, you're basically isolating women as a gender, and saying, 'This is how women should think. This is how their sexuality should be.' It's counterproductive (from what I understand) to the equality movement." Performer Samantha Bentley believes that pornography already includes equality for women, stating that women are necessary for the porn industry and are represented and paid equally or more than men.

While praising sites including Bellesa, Sssh.com and ForHerTube for presenting "adult content that centers women's agency and portrays them as active, consenting players enjoying realistic sexual experiences", Sofia Barrett-Ibarria of Vice wrote that the narrative of "porn for women" makes harmful generalizations about what women enjoy, presents porn not labelled as such as for male consumption and can exclude queerness and cisgenderness. Barrett-Ibarria quoted Sssh.com founder Angie Rowntree saying that the term "porn for women" on sites is "a huge injustice to the diversity of our desires" and Erika Lust as preferring "indie" to "porn for women". Chauntelle Tibbals said, "Nothing can meet the needs of all women, as all women have very diverse interests". Pornographic actor Courtney Trouble suggested instead having labels to describe which videos "depict masculine domination, or other factors that may present themselves to be undesirable to an audience that's seeking something 'feminine focused'".

Feminist pornographer Ms. Naughty (2013) said she originally set out to 'make porn for women' as 'a feminist act' in opposition to the problematic aspects of male-centric mainstream porn. At the Women's Erotica Network (WEN), she and other directors 'were essentially making up the concept of porn for women as we went along (...). We often pondered the question of "what women want" and agreed that there wasn't any one thing that all women desired.' Eventually she concluded that 'porn for women is a problematic phrase because it's so broad and implies that there is one form of porn that appeals to all women. This is wrong, of course. Women's erotic tastes are just as expansive and diverse as men's.' She and other porn-loving women have objected to 'porn for women' being equated with '"soft" romantic porn' (as if no woman in the world is capable of handling the "hard stuff"), and that in practice, 'porn for women' has usually assumed all 'women' to be 'heterosexual, cisgender, white, and middle class', to the exclusion of many other female perspectives and experiences.

Some women say that they "see their consumption of pornography as both a source of sexual pleasure and affirmation of their sexual identities, as well as an exercise of freedom of choice."

== See also ==
- Feminist sex wars – Dissenting views within the feminist movement regarding sexuality
- Feminist pornography – Genre of pornographic film developed by and/or for sex-positive feminists
- Raunch culture – Book by Ariel Levy
- Sex-positive feminism – Branch of feminism that emphasizes sexual freedoms
- Women's erotica – Erotic material that caters specifically to women

== Bibliography ==
- D. Cornell ed., Feminism and Pornography (OUP 2000)
- Easton, Susan (20 June 2005). The Problem of Pornography: Regulation and the Right to Free Speech. Routledge. ISBN 978-1-134-87349-4.
- Juffer, Jane (1998). At Home with Pornography: Women, Sex, and Everyday Life. New York: NYU Press. p. 272. ISBN 9780814742372.
- Ann Snitow, 'Mass Market Romance: Porn for Women is Different' (1983)
- Taormino, Tristan; Shimizu, Celine Parreñas; Penley, Constance; Miller-Young, Mireille (2013). The Feminist Porn Book: The Politics of Producing Pleasure. New York: Feminist Press at the City University of New York. ISBN 9781558618190. OCLC 828140733.
