= Constance (1998 film) =

1998 erotic film

- Directed by: Knud Vesterskov
- Written by: Knud Vesterskov
- Produced by: Lene Børglum; Christian Sylvest
- Starring: Katja Kean; Anaïs; Mark Duran; Niels Dencker
- Cinematography: Steen Møller Rasmussen
- Edited by: Rikke Malene Nielsen
- Music by: Peter Kyed; Peter Peter
- Distributed by: Team Video Plus (Denmark); Magma (Germany)
- Release date: 1998
- Running time: 70 minutes
- Country: Denmark
- Language: Danish

Constance is a 1998 feminist erotic film directed by Knud Vesterskov and produced by Puzzy Power, a division of Lars von Trier's film company Zentropa. It was the first hardcore pornographic film ever to have been produced by an established mainstream film studio.

Constance is based on the Puzzy Power Manifesto developed by Zentropa in 1997, and was the first in a series of pornographic films aimed particularly at a female audience. The others would be Zentropa's Pink Prison (1999) and All About Anna (2005).

== Plot ==
A young woman, Constance (Anaïs), arrives at the mansion of the experienced Lola (Katja Kean), where she is initiated into the mysteries of sexuality. The story is told in flashback via a framing device with lyrical diary excerpts and narration read by mainstream actresses Christiane Bjørg Nielsen and Hella Joof. (In the English-language version, narration is by Danish actress Susan Olsen and Helle Fagralid).

== Critical reception ==
The film was shown in mainstream cinemas in Europe, and was reviewed by mainstream film critics. The Stockholm Film Festival arranged a special screening in Stockholm on Valentine's Day.

Constance became a considerable success, and generated considerable hype, especially in Scandinavia. It was nominated for three AVN Awards: Best Art Direction - Video; Best Music; and Best Videography. The reaction of film critics was "mixed."

In 2006, it was in part this film's claim of mainstream audience viewing behind a process that ended up with porn being legalized in Norway.

In September 2007, German weekly magazine Stern wrote: "Women too like to see other people having sex. What they don't like is the endless close-ups of hammering body parts without a story. Lars von Trier is the first to have realised this and produced valuable quality porn films for women."
