= Knud Vesterskov =

Danish film director

Knud Vesterskov is a Danish film director who originally made his mark with a long string of experimental art films. He later wrote and directed two highly unusual hardcore pornography films, Constance (1998) and HotMen CoolBoyz (2000), both produced by Lars von Trier's company Zentropa Entertainments based in Denmark.

Knud Vesterskov's career is the subject of Bent Staalhøj's feature-length documentary From Scratz (2002), included on the French 2xDVD release of HotMen CoolBoyz.

== Filmography ==
- Johnny (1988)
- HOV! (FAMOUS LAST WORDS) (1989)
- A Motherly Peepshow (1989)
- The Night Ride (1989)
- Miss Lola (1990)
- Other Traces (1991)
- Jeg kommer igen i morgen (aka: I'll Be Back Tomorrow) (1992)
- Shooting Script: A Transatlantic Love Story (1992)
- The Tattoed Sheep (1992)
- By The Dawn's Early Light (1993)
- Urban Dissonance (1993)
- Nazi-Nigger (1994)
- Stjålne blikke (aka: Stolen Glimpses) (1996)
- GEEK, N.Y.C.'s Secret Sideshow (1997)
- The Mulatto (1998)
- Constance (1998)
- HotMen CoolBoyz (2000)
