= M. Maurice Hawkesworth =

American writer, record producer, and creative manager

M. Maurice Hawkesworth (born February 23, 1960) is an American-born writer, record producer, and creative manager based in Europe. He worked as an A&R manager for Mega Records in the early 1990s, contributing to the international success of acts such as Ace of Base and Leila K, and later co-founded independent record labels. In 2025, he published two companion books, the nonfiction Jeg Elsker Dig: The Secret Life of Ancient Words and the novel The Smoking Gun: Confessions of Mimi, America’s Talking Gun.

== Early career ==
Hawkesworth began his career in music as a producer and songwriter. He relocated from the United States to Europe, working with a number of emerging acts in the 1990s.

== Career in music ==
During the early 1990s, Hawkesworth joined Mega Records in Copenhagen as A&R and Creative Manager. In this role, he helped shape the sound and image of Scandinavian pop acts including Ace of Base and Leila K. He contributed production guidance to Ace of Base's debut album, including All That She Wants and The Sign. The Sign went on to sell over 30 million copies worldwide and was later named Billboard's number-one song of the 1990s.

In Finland, Hawkesworth co-wrote lyrics and music for Magenta Skycode, whose album Relief won the Emma Award (the Finnish equivalent of the Grammy). He also worked with PMMP and other Finnish artists, with songs reaching national airplay charts.

He later composed the score for the film All About Anna (2005), produced by Zentropa and Innovent Films, which earned him a nomination for Best Film Score at the AVN Awards.

Hawkesworth founded the independent record labels Invisible Wave and Iwave Records.

== Writing ==
Hawkesworth is the author of two companion books published in 2025:

- Jeg Elsker Dig: The Secret Life of Ancient Words (Wedgwood Press, 2025, ASIN B0FSSLKYDV). A nonfiction work blending linguistics, cultural history, and memoir. The book explores what Hawkesworth calls "fossils" in language—words that have survived for millennia—and connects them with personal testimony about authorship, theft, and survival.
- The Smoking Gun: Confessions of Mimi, America’s Talking Gun (Wedgwood Press, 2025, ASIN B0FRNPCRDH). A satirical and surreal novel narrated by a sentient revolver. It explores themes of violence, politics, American identity, and cultural mythology.

Hawkesworth has described the two books as companion works, with one nonfiction and the other fiction, but sharing common themes of words, memory, survival, and theft.

== Themes ==
Recurring themes in Hawkesworth's work include:

- the survival of cultural "fossils" in language, music, and art,
- testimony about authorship, theft, and credit in the pop music industry,
- and the intersections of popular culture, memory, and myth.

== Recognition ==
- Contributor to multiple international hit singles, including Ace of Base's The Sign.
- Emma Award (Finland) for work with Magenta Skycode.
- AVN nomination for Best Film Score (All About Anna).
- Songs written and produced by Hawkesworth have appeared on MTV and international charts.

== Published works ==
- Jeg Elsker Dig: The Secret Life of Ancient Words (Wedgwood Press, 2025, ASIN B0FSSLKYDV)
- The Smoking Gun: Confessions of Mimi, America’s Talking Gun (Wedgwood Press, 2025, ASIN B0FRNPCRDH)

== Songwriting credits ==
- Leila K – (1990s)
- Magenta Skycode – Relief (Emma Award-winning album, 2007)
- PMMP – selected songs (2000s)
- Various artists under Invisible Wave and Iwave Records (2000s–2010s)
