= Pink Prison =

- Directed by: Lisbeth Lynghøft
- Written by: Lisbeth Lynghøft
- Produced by: Lene Børglum
- Starring: Katja Kean; Anders Nyborg; Alberto Rey; Mark Duran; Mr. Marcus
- Cinematography: Jens Stang
- Edited by: Jens Stang
- Music by: Nils Lassen
- Distributed by: Team Video Plus (Denmark); Magma (Germany)
- Release date: 1999 (Denmark)
- Running time: 87 minutes
- Country: Denmark
- Language: English

Pink Prison is a 1999 erotic film for women, directed by Danish director Lisbeth Lynghøft, and produced by Puzzy Power, a division of Lars von Trier's film company Zentropa.

As the follow-up to Constance (1998), it was the second hard-core pornographic film ever to have been produced by an established mainstream film production company.

Pink Prison is based on the Puzzy Power Manifesto developed by Zentropa in 1997, as were Zentropa's two other sex films for women: Constance (1998), and All About Anna (2005).

== Plot ==
Katja Kean stars as a photo journalist, Mila, who breaks into a men's penitentiary to get an interview with the mysterious warden and thus win a bet with her publisher. Encounters with various inmates and staff members, including the helpful Prison Chef (Mr. Marcus), lead her gradually closer to her goal, but all is not what it seems.

== Critical reception ==
Pink Prison was shown at Stockholm Film Festival in 1999, and at Rotterdam Film Festival in 2000.

The film maintains a dreamy atmosphere and manages to turn a number of porn film conventions upside down.

It became a huge success, especially in Scandinavia, and won a Venus Award in Berlin as Best Scandinavian Film.

In July 2009, women's magazine Cosmopolitan (German edition) ranked Pink Prison as #1 in its Top Five of Die Besten Frauenpornos (best women's porn), calling it the "Vorbild für die neue Porno-Generation" (role model for the new porn-generation).
