= Jessica Nilsson =

Swedish director based in Denmark (born 1965)

Jessica Nilsson (born 11 January 1965) is a Swedish director based in Denmark. She is best known for directing the feature film All About Anna (2005), along with other films.

Nilsson was born and grew up in Sweden, but moved to Denmark in 1989. She studied at the Royal Danish Academy of Fine Arts, and later graduated from the National Film School of Denmark. Her short film Pølsen won First Prize at the Oslo Short Film Festival 1998.

Spotless was in competition at the Sundance Film Festival in 2001 and was shown at the Odense International Film Festival in 2000, where she received the Danish Directors' Prize of Merit. Spotless won the Special Jury Prize at Flickerfest 2001 in Sydney. All About Anna won three Scandinavian Adult Awards, including Best Scandinavian Couples Film, and was nominated for four AVN Awards, including Best Foreign Film.

Nilsson writes and directs documentaries, short movies, music videos, commercials, and radio plays. She made her radio play debut with Hullet in 2001. The Danish Association of the Blind awarded her its 2005 Radioplay Award for her radio play Flammende kærlighed, produced by Danmarks Radio.

She directed a second feature film, Sverige er fantastisk, a road movie starring Lene Maria Christensen, Mette Føns and Erik Clausen. It was shot in 2006 and was released in 2015.

== Filmography ==
- TV-Ansjosen (1995) (TV series)
- Pølsen (1997)
- Taber! (1998)
- Psykologens dagbog (1999)
- Spotless (1999)
- Sjätte dagen (2001) (TV-series)
- Die Jodeladies: Absolute partyterapi (2002)
- Stressless (2003)
- All About Anna (2005)
- Homeless (2008)
- Ulla – B wants a job (2009)
- Safehouse - Trafficked (documentary 2010)
- Pia Wants to Survive - Cancer (documentary 2012 - ?)
- The Man Who Fell Down the Stairs as a 3 Year Old – Schizophrenia (documentary 2013 - ?)
- Painless (2014)
- Sverige er fantastisk (2015)

== Radio plays ==
- Hullet (2001)
- Til døden os skiller (2003)
- Flammende begær (2004)
- Fødselspsykose (2007)
