= Joan Ørting =

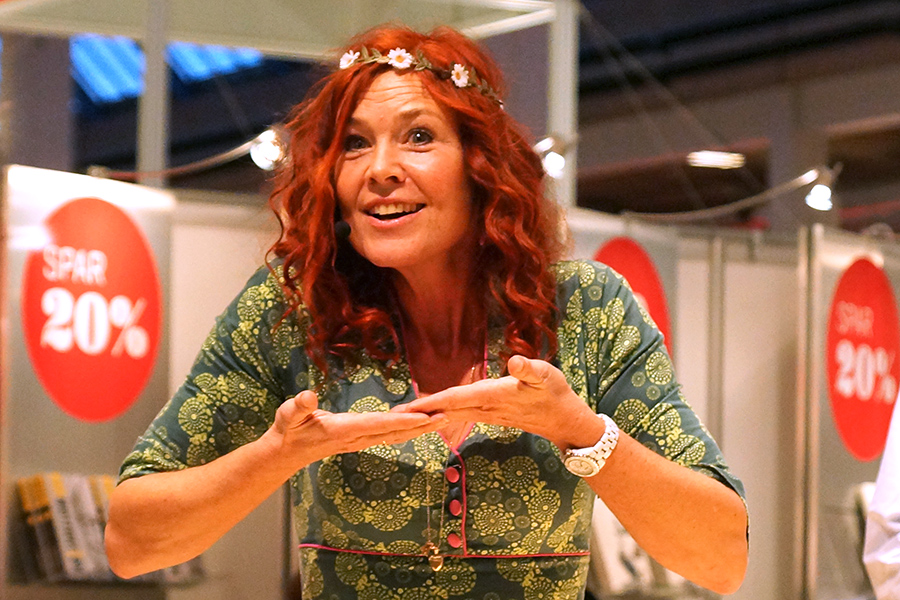
Joan Ørting at Danish Book Fair 2014

Joan Ørting (born March 26, 1960) is a Danish sexologist, letter column editor and former TV-host.

== Biography ==
From 1979 to 1991, Joan Ørting was a drama director at the Children's and Youth Theatre Gewanda in Gladsaxe. From 1987 to 1991, she was also a folk high school teacher at Byhøjskolen in Copenhagen. From 1992 to 1996, Joan Ørting continued her career in the theater industry as an assistant director at Betty Nansen Theatre (1992-1994) and a folk high school teacher in the theater program at Svendborg Folk High School (1995-1996). During this period, Joan Ørting co-founded the theater group Antropopipselskabet and directed the performance "Dyr med tøj på" (Animals Wearing Clothes), written by Lilja Scherfig and produced by Jakob Olrik. The performance was staged at Den Grå Hal and featured 150 participants (1994-1995).

From 1997 to 2000, Joan Ørting taught communication, TV-video, and culture at the daytime folk high school in Frederiksberg and was a folk high school teacher in personal development at Esbjerg Folk High School. During the same period, Joan Ørting began working as a freelance course instructor and speaker. She also worked as a personal development teacher and conducted union representative courses at LO School.

In 2001, Joan Ørting was hired as an advice columnist at BT and worked freelance as a sexologist. From 2006 to 2010, Joan Ørting was the advice columnist for Ekstra Bladet. In 2006, Joan Ørting and Jakob Olrik founded the sexologist education program and opened Villa Wilder in Christianshavn.

Joan Ørting is also known for her appearance on TV3's program *Sexskolen* (The Sex School) in 2006. She appeared on the TV program *Varm på is* in 2007, was the host of *Jagten på gnisten* (The Hunt for the Spark) in 2008, and appeared in *Sexologerne* in 2010. In 2010, Joan Ørting received the One 2 Speak award as a speaker on topics such as happiness and quality of life.

Joan Ørting had a minor role in the film *Smukke dreng* (Beautiful Boy) in 1993 and hosted the educational DVD *Sex-akademiet* (Sex Academy) in 2004.

== Books ==
Har du lyst? skrevet af Lilja Scherfig (2006) Ta mig! (2007) Varm Weekend med Karen Seneca (2008) Hvad vil du ha? (2009) Vær åben (2011) Elsk dig selv – og bliv elsket (2014) De 5 erotiske sprog - (2021)
