= Maria Beatty =

Venezuelan filmmaker

- Born: Caracas, Venezuela
- Occupations: Film director and producer

Maria Beatty is a Venezuelan filmmaker who directs, acts, and produces. Her films are often made in black and white and cover various aspects of female sexuality, including BDSM and fetishism. She was inspired by expressionist German cinema, French surrealism, and American film noir.

She sometimes stars in her own films, such as The Elegant Spanking (1995) and The Black Glove (1997). In 2007, she won the FICEB Tacón De Aguja Best Director Award for Silken Sleeves.

Annie Sprinkle’s 1992 production The Sluts and Goddesses Video Workshop – Or How To Be A Sex Goddess in 101 Easy Steps was co-produced and co-directed with Beatty. It featured music by composer Pauline Oliveros.

== Selected filmography ==
- Spit and Ashes (2019)
- The Black Widow (2015)
- The Medicine Man (2013)
- Vampire Sisters (2010)
- The Return of Post Apocalyptic Cowgirls (2010)
- Bandaged (2009)
- Post Apocalyptic Cowgirls (2009)
- The Strap-On Motel (2008)
- White Bonnet (2008)
- Belle de Nature (2008)
- Sex Mannequin (2007)
- Boy in a Bathtub (2007)
- Coma (2007)
- Mask of Innocence (2006)
- Silken Sleeves (2006)
- Ecstasy in Berlin, 1926 (2004)
- Tight Security (2003)
- Seven Deadly Sins (2002)
- Waterworld (2002)
- Tina's Toytrunk (2001)
- Ladies of the Night (2000)
- Sassy Schoolgirl Pt. 2 (2000)
- Leda and the Swan (1999)
- Testify My Love (1999)
- Doctor's Orders (1998)
- Sassy Schoolgirl Pt. 1 (1998)
- Converted to Tickling (1998)
- The Boiler Room (1998)
- Let the Punishment fit the Child (1997)
- The Dueling Pages (1997)
- The Black Glove (1997)
- The Elegant Spanking (1995)
- A Lot of Fun for the Evil One (1993)
- Imaging Her Erotics (1992)
- Sphinxes Without Secrets (1991)
- Gang of Souls: A Generation of Beat Poets (1989)

== See also ==
- List of female film and television directors
- List of LGBT-related films directed by women
