= Lene Børglum =

Danish film producer

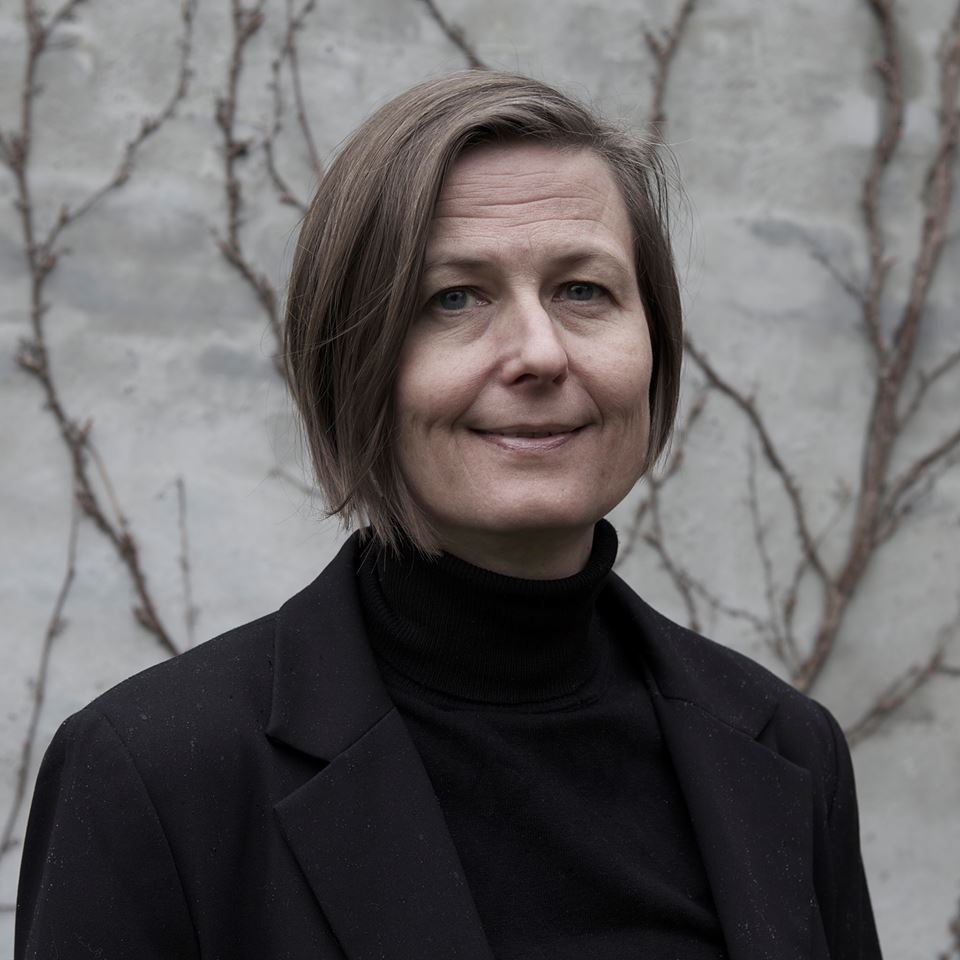
- Born: 21 August 1961 (age 64); Denmark
- Occupation: Film producer

Lene Børglum (born 21 August 1961) is a Danish film producer. Børglum was one of the key executives and co-owners of Zentropa from its early start in 1992, until 2007.

== Life and career ==
Børglum was deeply involved in the development of Zentropa from its very start till its state in 2007 as a major European independent production company. She handled international financing on a large number of Zentropa's international films, including Lars von Trier's highly acclaimed and awarded films The Kingdom (1994, 1996), Breaking The Waves (1996), The Idiots (1998), Dancer in the Dark (2000), and she was executive producer on Trier's films Dogville (2003), Manderlay (2005), and The Boss Of It All (2006). After Børglum left Zentropa in 2007, she was executive producer on Swedish director Lukas Moodysson's first English language film Mammoth (2009) and Nicolas Winding Refn's film Valhalla Rising (2009).

After their successful collaboration on Valhalla Rising, Børglum and Refn teamed up to found the production company Space Rocket Nation in January 2008.

In Space Rocket Nation, Børglum has produced Refn's film Only God Forgives (2012), starring Ryan Gosling and Kristin Scott Thomas, Liv Corfixen's documentary film My Life Directed by Nicolas Winding Refn (2014) and Refn's film The Neon Demon (2016). She is currently developing a number of other films.

== Selected filmography ==
- The Kingdom (1994, 1996)
- Breaking the Waves (1996)
- The Idiots (1998)
- Dancer in the Dark (2000)
- Dogville (2003)
- Manderlay (2005)
- The Boss of It All (2006)
- Valhalla Rising (2009)
- Only God Forgives (2013)
- My Life Directed by Nicolas Winding Refn (2014)
- The Neon Demon (2016)

== Sources ==
- Lene Børglum at IMDb
