= Lisbeth Lynghøft =

Danish director of stage and screen (born 1962)

Lisbeth Lynghøft (born 1962) is a Danish director of stage and screen, perhaps best known for the feature erotic film Pink Prison (1999).

She originally trained as an actress at the HB Studio in New York City and Cantabile 2 in Copenhagen, and has appeared in a number of stage productions, mainly in Sweden.

She started and for five years was artistic leader and director of the ensemble Teatret Bag Døren, based in Copenhagen, staging such productions as Arthur Kopit's Wings, Heinrich Mann's The Blue Angel and Thomas Mann's Death in Venice.

She has also worked as director at Den Nordiske Teaterhøjskole in Sweden.

Plays written by Lisbeth Lynghøft include A Dimple in the Tomb, about Emily Dickinson, and Passion Propeller.

Films written and directed by Lisbeth Lynghøft include the short subject Little Demons and the feature film Pink Prison (1999).
