= Harvey Weinstein =

American film producer and sex offender (born 1952)

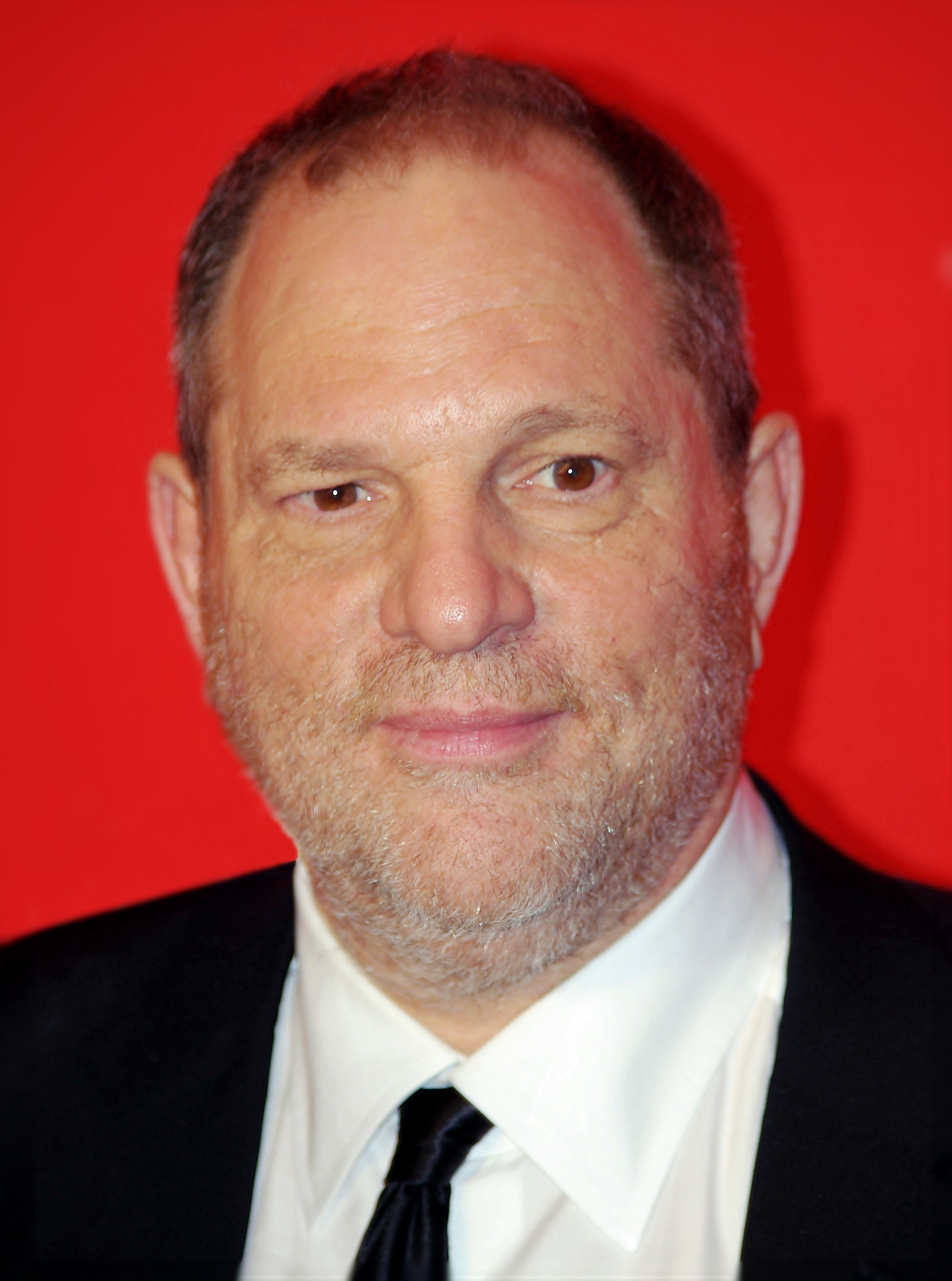
- Weinstein in 2011
- Born: March 19, 1952 (age 74); Queens, New York City, U.S.
- Occupation: Film producer
- Years active: 1979–2017
- Spouses: Eve Chilton (m. 1987; div. 2004) Georgina Chapman (m. 2007; div. 2021)
- Children: 5
- Relatives: Bob Weinstein (brother)
- Status: Incarcerated at Rikers Island
- Convictions: Rape (3 counts, California) (Note: One count of forcible oral copulation, one count of sexual battery by a foreign object, and one count of forcible rape); Criminal sex act (1 count, New York)
- Penalty: 15 years imprisonment (New York) and resentencing (California)

Details
- Victims: 4 confirmed 100+ alleged
- Date apprehended: May 25, 2018

Harvey Weinstein (born March 19, 1952) is an American former film producer. He is the co-founder of Miramax and the Weinstein Company. His companies produced films that have grossed over $10.78 billion worldwide, and he has received an Academy Award and eight Tony Awards. Weinstein's career ended in 2017 following a series of rape allegations, which resulted in him being convicted and sentenced to prison.

In October 2017, following sexual abuse allegations dating back to the late 1970s, Weinstein was dismissed from his company and expelled from the Academy of Motion Picture Arts and Sciences. More than 80 women made allegations of sexual harassment or rape against him by October 31. The allegations sparked the #MeToo social media campaign and subsequent sexual abuse allegations against many powerful figures worldwide; this phenomenon is referred to as the "Weinstein effect".

In May 2018, Weinstein was arrested and charged with rape in New York City; in February 2020, he was found guilty of two of five felony counts. Weinstein was sentenced to 23 years in prison on March 11, 2020. On July 20, 2021, Weinstein was extradited to Los Angeles to face further charges at a subsequent trial, where he was found guilty of three of seven charges on December 19, 2022. Weinstein was sentenced to 16 years in the Los Angeles trial, with his California prison term required to be served separately from his New York sentence.

On April 25, 2024, the New York Court of Appeals overturned the New York rape convictions because of "egregious errors" of procedure, ordering a retrial. Weinstein remained in prison because of the California conviction. The retrial began on April 15, 2025. On June 11, 2025, Weinstein was convicted in a mixed verdict. On June 12, 2025, an additional rape charge case against Weinstein was given a mistrial. On June 25, 2026, a month after a second mistrial was declared, Manhattan District Attorney Alvin Bragg announced that Weinstein would not receive an additional retrial for the alleged rape of Jessica Mann. On September 23, 2026, Weinstein was sentenced to 15 years in prison, followed by five years of post-release supervision, and was ordered to register as a sex offender.

== Early life ==
Weinstein's June 1969 senior yearbook photo at John Bowne High School

Weinstein was born on March 19, 1952, in the Flushing neighborhood of Queens, in New York City, to diamond cutter Max Weinstein (died 1976) and his wife, Miriam (née Postel; died 2016). The family is Jewish, and Weinstein's maternal grandparents immigrated to the United States from Poland. Harvey grew up with a younger brother, Bob, in the Electchester housing co-op in New York City; he graduated from John Bowne High School and then attended the State University of New York at Buffalo. With his brother, Bob, and Corky Burger, he formed Harvey & Corky Productions, which independently produced rock concerts in Buffalo through most of the 1970s. Among the top acts it brought to town were Frank Sinatra, the Who, Jackson Browne, and the Rolling Stones. Weinstein's longtime friend Jonathan A. Dandes followed him to Buffalo and has described Harvey as "aggressive" and "consumed" in matters of business. Although Weinstein attended the University at Buffalo from 1969 to 1973, he did not ultimately graduate, choosing instead to concentrate on his business interests.

== Career ==
=== 1970s: Early work and creation of Miramax ===
In the late 1970s, using profits from their concert promotion business, Weinstein and his brother founded the independent film distribution company Miramax Films, named after their parents Miriam and Max. The company's initial releases were primarily music-oriented concert films such as Paul McCartney's Rockshow.

=== 1980s: Success with arthouse and independent films ===
In the early 1980s, Miramax Films acquired the rights to two British films of benefit shows filmed for the human rights organization Amnesty International. Working closely with Martin Lewis, the producer of the original films, the Weinstein brothers edited the two films into one movie tailored for the American market. The resulting film was released as The Secret Policeman's Other Ball in May 1982, and it became Miramax Films' first hit. The movie raised considerable sums of money for Amnesty International and was credited by Amnesty with having helped to raise its profile in the United States. The Weinsteins slowly built upon this success throughout the 1980s with arthouse films which achieved critical attention and modest commercial success.

Weinstein and Miramax Films gained wider attention in 1988 with the release of Errol Morris' documentary The Thin Blue Line, which detailed the struggle of Randall Dale Adams, a wrongfully convicted inmate sentenced to death row. The publicity that soon surrounded the case resulted in Adams' release and nationwide publicity for Miramax Films. In 1989, their successful launch release of Steven Soderbergh's Sex, Lies, and Videotape propelled Miramax Films to become the most successful independent studio in America.

In 1989, Miramax Films also released two arthouse films, Peter Greenaway's The Cook, the Thief, His Wife & Her Lover and director Pedro Almodóvar's film Tie Me Up! Tie Me Down!, both of which received an X-rating from the MPAA rating board, effectively stopping nationwide release for these films. Weinstein sued the MPAA over the rating system. His lawsuit was later thrown out, but the MPAA introduced the NC-17 rating two months later.

=== 1990s–2004: Further success, Disney ownership deal ===
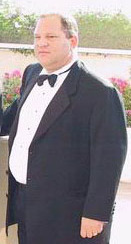
Weinstein at the 2002 Cannes Film Festival

Miramax Films continued to grow its library of films and directors until, in 1993, after the success of The Crying Game, Disney offered the Weinsteins $80 million for ownership of Miramax Films. The brothers agreed to the deal which in turn cemented their Hollywood clout and also ensured that they would remain at the head of their company. The following year, Miramax Films released its first blockbuster, Quentin Tarantino's Pulp Fiction, and distributed the popular independent film Clerks.

Miramax Films won its first Academy Award for Best Picture in 1997 with the victory of The English Patient. Pulp Fiction was nominated in 1995 but lost to Forrest Gump. This started a string of critical successes that included Good Will Hunting (1997) and Shakespeare in Love (1998), with both films receiving several awards, including numerous Academy Awards.

=== 2005–2017: The Weinstein Company ===
On September 30, 2005, the Weinstein brothers left Miramax Films to form their own production company, The Weinstein Company (TWC), with several other media executives, directors Quentin Tarantino and Robert Rodriguez, and Colin Vaines, who had successfully run the production department at Miramax Films for 10 years. In February 2011, filmmaker Michael Moore took legal action against the Weinstein brothers, claiming they owed him $2.7 million in profits for his documentary Fahrenheit 9/11 (2004), which he said were denied to him by "Hollywood accounting tricks." In February 2012, Moore dropped the lawsuit for an undisclosed settlement.

Weinstein was thanked or praised in 34 Academy Award acceptance speeches—as many times as God, and second only to Steven Spielberg (with 43 mentions), as found by an analysis of speeches made between 1966 and 2016.

On October 8, 2017, Harvey Weinstein was fired from TWC after a list of sexual abuse charges was released to the press. After months of unsuccessful attempts to sell the company or its library, TWC filed for bankruptcy, with Lantern Entertainment subsequently purchasing all assets in 2018. The company was shut down on July 16, 2018, and its website sometime thereafter.

While lauded for opening up the independent film market and making it financially viable, Weinstein has been criticized for the techniques he applied in his business dealings. Peter Biskind's book Down and Dirty Pictures: Miramax, Sundance and the Rise of Independent Film denounced Miramax's release history and editing of arthouse films. For example, the book states that 54 had been originally made as an arthouse film but, after Ryan Phillippe's sudden rise to stardom, Weinstein forced director Mark Christopher to re-edit and re-shoot the film to make it more mainstream.

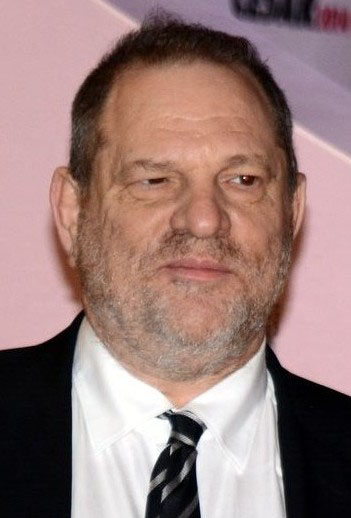
Weinstein in 2014

Weinstein re-edited several Asian films and dubbed them in English. Weinstein tried to release the English-dubbed versions of Shaolin Soccer and Hero in the United States theatrically, but they scored badly in test screenings, leading Weinstein to release the films in United States cinemas in their original language. Furthermore, Weinstein re-edited 1993 Cannes Palme d'Or winner Farewell My Concubine for American theatrical release; 1993 Cannes jury head Louis Malle was furious. "The film we admired so much in Cannes is not the film seen in this country, which is twenty minutes shorter—but it seems longer, because it doesn't make any sense", complained Malle.

When Weinstein was charged with handling the American release of Princess Mononoke, director Hayao Miyazaki was reported to have sent him a samurai sword in the mail. Attached to the blade was a stark message: "No cuts." Miyazaki commented on the incident: "Actually, my producer did that. Although I did go to New York to meet this man, this Harvey Weinstein, and I was bombarded with this aggressive attack, all these demands for cuts. I defeated him." Weinstein and his brother Bob have also been criticized for altering the vision of foreign filmmakers hired to create movies for Miramax, such as on the 1997 projects Mimic (directed by Guillermo del Toro) and Nightwatch (directed by Dane Ole Bornedal). Weinstein has always insisted that such changes were done in the interest of creating the most financially viable film. "I'm not cutting for fun," he said in an interview. "I'm cutting for the shit to work. All my life I served one master: the film. I love movies."

Another example cited by Biskind was Phillip Noyce's The Quiet American (2002), the release of which Weinstein delayed following the September 11 attacks owing to audience reaction in test screenings to the film's critical tone toward past U.S. foreign policy. After being told the film would go straight to video, Noyce planned to screen the film at the Toronto International Film Festival in order to mobilize critics to pressure Miramax to release it theatrically. Weinstein decided to screen the film at the festival only after he was lobbied by star Michael Caine, who threatened to boycott publicity for another film he had made for Miramax. The Quiet American received mostly positive reviews at the festival, and Miramax eventually released the film theatrically. However, it was alleged that Miramax did not make a major effort to promote the film for Academy Award consideration, though Caine was nominated for an Academy Award for Best Actor.

Weinstein acquired a reputation for ruthlessness and fits of anger. According to Biskind, Weinstein once put a New York Observer reporter in a headlock while throwing him out of a party. On another occasion, Weinstein yelled at director Julie Taymor and her husband during a disagreement over a test screening of her movie Frida, saying to Taymor, "You are the most arrogant person I have ever met!" and to her husband, film composer Elliot Goldenthal, "I don't like the look on your face. Why don't you defend your wife, so I can beat the shit out of you?"

In a 2004 New York magazine article, Weinstein appeared somewhat repentant for his often aggressive discussions with directors and producers. However, a Newsweek story on October 13, 2008, criticized Weinstein, who was accused of "hassling Sydney Pollack on his deathbed" about the release of the film The Reader. After Weinstein offered $1 million to charity if the accusation could be proven, journalist Nikki Finke published an email sent by Scott Rudin on August 22 asserting that Weinstein "harassed" Anthony Minghella's widow and a bedridden Pollack until Pollack's family asked him to stop.

In September 2009, Weinstein publicly voiced opposition to efforts to extradite Roman Polanski from Switzerland to the U.S. regarding a 1977 charge that he had drugged and raped a 13-year-old girl, to which Polanski pleaded guilty before fleeing the country. Weinstein, whose company distributed Roman Polanski: Wanted and Desired, a film about the Polanski case, questioned whether Polanski committed any crime, prompting Los Angeles County District Attorney Steve Cooley to insist that Polanski's guilty plea indicated that his action was a crime, and that several other serious charges were pending.

== Sexual abuse accusations, convictions and appeals ==
In October 2017, The New York Times and The New Yorker reported that more than a dozen women accused Weinstein of sexually harassing, assaulting, or raping them. Many other women in the film industry subsequently reported similar experiences with Weinstein, who denied "any nonconsensual sex". As a result of these allegations, Weinstein was dismissed from his production company, suspended from the British Academy of Film and Television Arts, and expelled from the Academy of Motion Picture Arts and Sciences. Weinstein also resigned from the Directors Guild of America and was denounced by leading figures in politics whom he had supported. The Los Angeles Police Department opened a criminal investigation for alleged rape, and New York and London police began investigating other sexual assault allegations. On October 10, 2017, Weinstein's wife, Georgina Chapman, announced that she was leaving him; their divorce was finalized in July 2021.

The sexual abuse allegations precipitated a wave of "national reckoning" against sexual harassment and assault in the United States known as the Weinstein effect. Compounded by other sexual harassment cases earlier in the year, the Weinstein reports and subsequent #MeToo hashtag campaign, which encouraged individuals to share their suppressed stories of sexual misconduct, created a cavalcade of allegations across multiple industries that brought about the swift ouster of many men in positions of power both in the United States and, as it spread, around the world.

Ronan Farrow reported in The New Yorker in November 2017 that Weinstein had hired British-Israeli private intelligence firm Black Cube in order to stop the publication of the abuse allegations against him. Using false identities, private investigators from Black Cube reportedly tracked and met journalists and actresses, in particular Rose McGowan, who accused Weinstein of rape. Weinstein reportedly had Black Cube, Kroll and other agencies "target, or collect information on, dozens of individuals, and compile psychological profiles that sometimes focused on their personal or sexual histories". Former Israeli prime minister Ehud Barak admitted to having introduced Weinstein to Black Cube, but denied knowing how Weinstein would employ their services.

Weinstein reportedly sought help from Farrow's father Woody Allen to help stop Farrow from reporting on the claims of sexual abuse against Weinstein. Allen declined to help. Weinstein also reportedly used Black Cube to attempt to silence journalists Megan Twohey and Jodi Kantor reporting on the allegations against him. According to Kantor, a Black Cube agent posing as a women's rights advocate attempted to manipulate and dupe her. Weinstein approached Hillary Clinton in an attempt to help him stop Farrow from publishing the sexual misconduct allegations against him. Clinton publicist Nick Merrill emailed Farrow and unsuccessfully attempted to convince him to not publish the story. According to Rose McGowan, Jennifer Siebel Newsom, California Governor Gavin Newsom's wife, aided Weinstein lawyer David Boies in attempting to bribe McGowan and keep her silent about her allegations against Weinstein.

In 2019, the documentary Untouchable was released with interviews from several of his accusers.

The New York County District Attorney's Office charged Weinstein with "rape, criminal sex act, sex abuse and sexual misconduct for incidents involving two separate women" on May 25, 2018. He was arrested the same day after surrendering to the New York City Police Department (NYPD) and released after US$1 million bail was posted on his behalf. He surrendered his passport and was required to wear an ankle monitor, with travel being restricted to New York and Connecticut. His lawyer, Benjamin Brafman, said Weinstein would plead not guilty. A trial date was set for January 6, 2020. On that date, Weinstein was also charged in Los Angeles with raping one woman and sexually assaulting another in 2013.

After deliberating for five days, a jury convicted Weinstein on February 24, 2020, of two of five criminal charges: one count of criminal sexual assault in the first degree and one count of rape in the third degree. The jury found him not guilty regarding predatory sexual assault, which could have led to a life sentence. Weinstein was remanded to jail at Rikers Island in New York City pending his sentencing hearing on March 11, when he was sentenced to 23 years in prison. Weinstein was then transferred to Wende Correctional Facility in Erie County, New York. Through his attorneys, Weinstein stated that he would appeal the verdict. Weinstein was stripped of his honorary CBE (Commander of the Most Excellent Order of the British Empire) on September 18, 2020. Once incarcerated, Weinstein hired prison consultant Craig Rothfeld. By June 2021, Weinstein had been transferred to the Mohawk Correctional Facility in Rome, New York.

On June 2, 2022, the New York State Supreme Court, Appellate Division, First Department upheld the verdicts and judgment on appeal. For the court's decision, Judge Angela Mazzarelli wrote, "We perceive no basis for reducing the sentence, and we have considered defendant's remaining arguments and find them unavailing." On August 25, 2022, Weinstein was granted a further appeal before the New York Court of Appeals.

=== California conviction ===
On July 20, 2021, Weinstein was flown to Los Angeles and taken to the Twin Towers Correctional Facility. The trial in Los Angeles commenced in October 2022. Weinstein was charged with 11 counts of rape, forcible oral copulation and sexual battery, stemming from alleged acts between 2004 and 2013. He was found guilty of three of seven charges (four of the initial 11 charges were dropped) on December 19, 2022. Convictions included charges of rape, forced oral copulation and third-degree sexual misconduct. On February 23, 2023, Weinstein was sentenced to 16 years in prison for these convictions. His sentence in California prisons must be served separately from (i.e., consecutively to rather than concurrently to) his time served in New York. Weinstein is appealing the Los Angeles conviction. On April 11, 2023, Weinstein was extradited from California and back to upstate New York's Mohawk Correctional Facility. After the New York convictions were overturned in April 2024, and plans were made to retry him in New York City, Weinstein was transferred back to Rikers Island prison.

On June 8, 2022, Weinstein was formally charged by the Metropolitan Police with two counts of indecent assault against a woman in London between July 31 and August 31, 1996.

On July 9, 2024, New York prosecutors announced an investigation was underway for additional claims against Weinstein for sexual assault, including for claims that fall within the state's statute of limitations, though no indictment was immediately sent to the grand jury.

=== New York conviction overturned ===
On April 25, 2024, the New York Court of Appeals overturned the New York rape convictions and said that the trial judge had made "egregious errors" with the attorney stating Weinstein had been "tried on his character, not the evidence." The Court of Appeals ordered a retrial. Weinstein accusers Ashley Judd, Rosanna Arquette, and Rose McGowan criticized the ruling.

==== Retrial ====
During a court hearing on July 19, 2024, Judge Curtis Farber ruled that Weinstein would be retried and tentatively set for the retrial to start on November 12, 2024. Despite this, Farber also ruled that previous plans to have the retrial start in September 2024 were still an option, and the start date of the retrial would depend on pretrial discoveries. Weinstein's lawyers have called for the retrial to begin as soon as possible. On January 29, 2025, Judge Farber set the retrial date to April 15, 2025, The jury selection process for the retrial began on April 15, 2025, with opening statements and witness testimony then beginning on April 23, 2025. Jury deliberations in the retrial would then begin on June 5, 2025. On June 11, 2025, Weinstein was found guilty of one count of criminal sexual act and not guilty of another. No verdict would be reached on an allegation made by a third woman. On May 15, 2026, mistrial was declared in his retrial for the Jessica Mann case after the presiding jury remained deadlocked. A hearing was then set for June 24, 2026 to determine whether or not prosecutors would seek another retrial for Mann's case.

==== Additional charges in New York ====
On September 12, 2024, a New York grand jury indicted Weinstein on new charges, as announced by prosecutors from the Manhattan District Attorney's office. These specific charges were initially unknown, as the indictment was sealed and only opened upon Weinstein's arraignment. On September 18, 2024, Weinstein was arraigned in New York for this new indictment, entering a plea of not guilty to one count of criminal sexual act in the first degree. The prosecution filed a motion to consolidate the new charges into Weinstein's retrial rather than have two separate New York trials. The presiding judge granted the prosecution's motion to consolidate on October 23. On June 12, 2025, Weinstein received a mistrial on this charge following tensions within the jury. Another mistrial would be declared on May 15, 2026, though the prosecution would still be granted the authority to determine whether or not another retrial would be pursued after a 30-day waiting period.

=== Dismissal of Jessica Mann case ===
On June 25, 2026, Manhattan District Attorney Alvin Bragg declared that Weinstein would not receive a fourth criminal trial for the alleged rape of Jessica Mann. However, Weinstein remains convicted in two separate cases, one in New York and one in California. On September 23, 2026, he was sentenced to 15 years in prison, followed by five years of post-release supervision, for the first-degree criminal sexual act against Miriam Haley. In the California case, Weinstein's appeal of his 2022 rape conviction was unanimously denied by the three-judge panel of the Appeals Court, but the panel did set aside his 16-year sentence in the case because it was based, in part, on a New York conviction which has since been overturned; he will be re-sentenced.

== Personal life ==
Weinstein has been married twice. In 1987, he married his assistant Eve Chilton; the couple divorced in 2004. They had three daughters. In 2007, Weinstein married English fashion designer and actress Georgina Chapman. They have a daughter and a son. On October 10, 2017, after the sexual harassment accusations became public, Chapman announced that she was leaving Weinstein. They reached a settlement in January 2018, and their divorce was finalized in July 2021.

=== Activism ===
Weinstein was active on issues such as gun control, poverty, AIDS, juvenile diabetes, and multiple sclerosis research. Until October 2017, he served on the board of the Robin Hood Foundation, a New York City-based non-profit that targets poverty, and co-chaired one of its annual benefits. Weinstein was critical of the lack of universal healthcare in the United States.

Weinstein has been a longtime supporter of and contributor to the Democratic Party, including the campaigns of President Barack Obama and presidential candidates Hillary Clinton and John Kerry. Weinstein supported Hillary Clinton's 2008 presidential campaign. In 2012, he hosted an election fundraiser for Obama at his home in Westport, Connecticut.

=== Fashion ===
Weinstein was active in the fashion industry. He produced the fashion reality show Project Runway, making stars of designer Michael Kors, model Heidi Klum and editor Nina Garcia. Weinstein was instrumental in the revival of Halston, collaborating with Tamara Mellon, Sarah Jessica Parker, and stylist Rachel Zoe. He licensed the option to revive the Charles James brand. Celebrities were asked to wear Marchesa (the label of his then-partner and later then-wife, Georgina Chapman) at least once if they were cast in a Weinstein movie. Weinstein's production companies were frequently involved in fashion-themed movies, including Madonna's W.E., Robert Altman's Prêt-à-Porter, and Tom Ford's A Single Man. Stars of Weinstein's films appeared on more than a dozen Vogue covers.

=== Health ===
In 1999, Weinstein underwent surgery for Fournier gangrene.

In July 2024, Weinstein was admitted to the prison ward of Bellevue Hospital with what his lawyers said were COVID-19 and double pneumonia. On September 9, 2024, he underwent emergency heart surgery at Bellevue and was said to be in critical condition for a time afterward. In October 2024, it was reported that he had been diagnosed with chronic myeloid leukemia. On December 2, 2024, it was reported that Weinstein was hospitalized in Manhattan due to blood test results that were described as "alarming".

== Selected filmography ==
=== Producer ===
Year	Film	Notes
1981	The Burning	also writer (story)
1982	The Secret Policeman's Other Ball	
1985	Deep End	Documentary
1986	Playing for Keeps	also writer
1988	Light Years a.k.a. Gandahar (English Version)	
1995	Restoration	co-producer
1998	Shakespeare in Love	Academy Award for Best Picture; BAFTA Award for Best Film; Golden Globe Award for Best Motion Picture – Musical or Comedy; Satellite Award for Best Film – Musical or Comedy; Nominated – Producers Guild of America Award for Best Theatrical Motion Picture
2000	Malèna	Nominated – BAFTA Award for Best Film Not in the English Language
2002	Gangs of New York	Nominated – Academy Award for Best Picture; Nominated – BAFTA Award for Best Film; Nominated – Producers Guild of America Award for Best Theatrical Motion Picture
2003	Master and Commander: The Far Side of the World	co-producer (uncredited)
2009	Nine	Satellite Award for Best Film – Musical or Comedy; Nominated – Golden Globe Award for Best Motion Picture – Musical or Comedy
2011	My Week with Marilyn	Nominated – BAFTA Award for Best British Film; Nominated – Golden Globe Award for Best Motion Picture – Musical or Comedy
2017	Tulip Fever	
2017	The Current War	Uncredited; Film generally released in 2019.

=== Director ===
Year	Film	Notes
1986	Playing for Keeps	also writer and producer, co-directed with Bob Weinstein
1987	The Gnomes' Great Adventure	1988 English dub

=== Executive producer ===
Year	Film	Notes
1989	Scandal	co-executive producer
1989	The Lemon Sisters	co-executive producer
1990	Hardware	
1990	Strike It Rich	
1990	Crossing the Line	co-executive producer
1991	Madonna: Truth or Dare	
1991	A Rage in Harlem	
1991	The Pope Must Diet	
1992	Reservoir Dogs	
1992	Dust Devil	co-executive producer
1992	Into the West	co-executive producer
1993	Benefit of the Doubt	
1993	The Night We Never Met	
1993	True Romance	
1993	The Hour of the Pig	
1993	Map of the Human Heart	
1994	Mother's Boys	
1994	Pulp Fiction	co-executive producer
1994	Il Postino: The Postman	
1994	Prêt-à-Porter	
1995	Smoke	
1995	The Englishman Who Went up a Hill but Came down a Mountain	
1995	The Thief and the Cobbler/Arabian Knight	
1995	Blue in the Face	
1995	Things to Do in Denver When You're Dead	
1995	A Month by the Lake	
1995	The Journey of August King	
1995	The Crossing Guard	
1996	Beautiful Girls	
1996	The English Patient	
1996	Flirting with Disaster	
1996	The Pallbearer	
1996	Scream	
1996	Jane Eyre	
1996	The Crow: City of Angels	
1996	Emma	
1996	The Last of the High Kings	
1996	Victory	co-executive producer
1997	Addicted to Love	
1997	Nightwatch	
1997	Mimic	
1997	She's So Lovely	
1997	Jackie Brown	
1997	Good Will Hunting	
1997	Cop Land	
1997	The Wings of the Dove	
1997	Princess Mononoke	2000 English dub
1997	Scream 2	
1997	Air Bud	
1998	A Price Above Rubies	
1998	Phantoms	
1998	Senseless	
1998	Wide Awake	
1998	Ride	
1998	Since You've Been Gone	TV film
1998	The Mighty	
1998	Velvet Goldmine	
1998	Halloween H20: 20 Years Later	
1998	54	
1998	Rounders	
1998	Little Voice	co-executive producer
1998	Talk of Angels	
1998	B. Monkey	co-executive producer
1998	The Faculty	
1998	Playing by Heart	
1999	Guinevere	
1999	She's All That	
1999	My Life So Far	
1999	Teaching Mrs. Tingle	
1999	Outside Providence	
1999	In Too Deep	
1999	Mansfield Park	
1999	Holy Smoke!	
1999	Music of the Heart	
1999	The Cider House Rules	
2000	The Crow: Salvation	
2000	Down to You	
2000	Scream 3	
2000	Love's Labour's Lost	
2000	Committed	
2000	Scary Movie	
2000	Chocolat	
2000	The Yards	
2000	Bounce	
2000	Dracula 2000	
2001	The Others	
2001	The Lord of the Rings: The Fellowship of the Ring	
2001	Iris	
2001	The Shipping News	
2001	Spy Kids	
2001	Texas Rangers	
2001	Scary Movie 2	
2001	Jay and Silent Bob Strike Back	
2001–2005	Project Greenlight	Nominated – Primetime Emmy Award for Outstanding Reality Program (2002, 2004, 2005)
2002	Chicago	
2002	The Lord of the Rings: The Two Towers	
2002	Spy Kids 2: The Island of Lost Dreams	
2002	Below	
2002	Waking Up in Reno	
2002	Equilibrium	
2002	Confessions of a Dangerous Mind	
2003	Cold Mountain	
2003	The Lord of the Rings: The Return of the King	
2003	Spy Kids 3-D: Game Over	
2003	My Boss's Daughter	
2003	Duplex	
2003	Scary Movie 3	
2003	Bad Santa	co-executive producer
2003	The Human Stain	
2003	Kill Bill: Volume 1	
2004	Jersey Girl	
2004	Ella Enchanted	
2004	Fahrenheit 9/11	
2004	The Aviator	
2004	Finding Neverland	
2004	Shall We Dance?	
2004	Kill Bill: Volume 2	
2004–2017	Project Runway	Nominated – Primetime Emmy Award for Outstanding Reality-Competition Program (2005–2015)
2005	Sin City	
2005	Cursed	
2005	The Adventures of Sharkboy and Lavagirl	
2005	The Brothers Grimm	
2005	Underclassman	
2005	Proof	
2005	Derailed	
2006	Clerks II	
2006	Doogal	
2006	Scary Movie 4	
2006	Pulse	
2006	Breaking and Entering	
2006	Miss Potter	
2006	School for Scoundrels	
2007	Grindhouse	
2007	The Mist	
2007	Rogue	
2007	Sicko	
2007	Halloween	
2007	Awake	
2007	1408	
2007	Who's Your Caddy?	
2007	The Nanny Diaries	
2008	Superhero Movie	
2008	Rambo	
2008	The Reader	
2008	Zack and Miri Make a Porno	
2008	Soul Men	
2009	Inglourious Basterds	
2009	Fanboys	
2009	Halloween II	
2009	Capitalism: A Love Story	
2010	Piranha 3D	
2010	The King's Speech	
2010	The Fighter	
2011	The Artist	
2011	Hoodwinked Too! Hood vs. Evil	
2011	Scream 4	
2011	Spy Kids: All the Time in the World	
2011	Apollo 18	
2011	Butter	
2011	I Don't Know How She Does It	
2012	W.E.	
2012	Piranha 3DD	
2012	Silver Linings Playbook	
2012	Django Unchained	
2013	Escape from Planet Earth	
2013	Scary Movie 5	
2013	Lee Daniels' The Butler	
2013	August: Osage County	
2013	One Chance	
2013	Fruitvale Station	
2013	Mandela: Long Walk to Freedom	
2014	Vampire Academy	
2014	Sin City: A Dame to Kill For	
2014	Big Eyes	
2014	Marco Polo	
2015	Woman in Gold	
2015	Southpaw	
2015	Carol	
2015	Macbeth	
2015	Burnt	
2015	The Hateful Eight	
2016	Sing Street	
2016	War & Peace	
2016	Lion	
2016	The Founder	
2016	Gold	
2017	Wind River	
2017	Leap!	
2017	47 Meters Down	
2017	Amityville: The Awakening	
2017	The Upside	

== Awards and honors ==
Weinstein has won numerous awards. On September 26, 2000, he was awarded the honorary degree of Doctor of Humane Letters (DHL) by the University at Buffalo. On April 19, 2004, Weinstein was appointed an honorary commander of the Order of the British Empire (CBE) in recognition of his contributions to the British film industry. This award was honorary because Weinstein is not a citizen of a Commonwealth country. On March 2, 2012, Weinstein was made a knight of the French Legion of Honour, in recognition of Miramax's efforts to increase the presence and popularity of foreign films in the United States.

The University at Buffalo revoked Weinstein's honorary doctorate, saying his conduct "contradicts the spirit of the honorary degree", while French President Emmanuel Macron revoked his Legion of Honour, both in late 2017. On September 18, 2020, Weinstein was stripped of his honorary CBE, following his conviction for rape and sexual assault earlier that year.

The table below lists additional awards nominated to or won by Weinstein. Those not shared with others have also since been rescinded. Wins are highlighted in pink.

Year	Association	Award	Notes	Ref.
1996	Britannia Awards	Britannia Award for Excellence in Film	shared with Bob Weinstein	
1997	Gotham Awards	Producers Award	shared with Bob Weinstein and James Schamus	
1998	GLAAD Media Award	GLAAD Excellence in Media Award	shared with Bob Weinstein	
1998	British Academy Film Awards	BAFTA Award for Best Film	shared with David Parfitt, Donna Gigliotti, Edward Zwick and Marc Norman	
1999	Producers Guild of America Awards	Outstanding Producer of Theatrical Motion Pictures	shared with David Parfitt, Donna Gigliotti, Edward Zwick and Marc Norman	
1999	Satellite Awards	Satellite Award for Best Motion Picture, Comedy or Musical	shared with David Parfitt, Donna Gigliotti, Edward Zwick and Marc Norman	
1999	Academy Award	Academy Award for Best Picture	shared with David Parfitt, Donna Gigliotti, Edward Zwick and Marc Norman	
2001	British Independent Film Awards	Special Jury Prize	shared with Bob Weinstein	
2001	British Academy Film Awards	BAFTA Award for Best Film Not in the English Language	shared with Carlo Bernasconi and Giuseppe Tornatore	
2002	British Film Institute	British Film Institute Fellowship	rescinded in 2017	
2002	Hugo Award	Hugo Award for Best Dramatic Presentation	shared with Peter Jackson, Fran Walsh, Phillipa Boyens, J.R.R. Tolkien, Barrie M. Osborne, Tim Sanders, Bob Weinstein	
2002	Christopher Award	Christopher Award for best film	shared with Richard Eyre, Charles Wood, Robert Fox, Scott Rudin, Anthony Minghella, Sydney Pollack, Guy East, David M Thompson and Thomas Hedley Jr	
2002	Primetime Emmy Awards	Primetime Emmy Award for Outstanding Unstructured Reality Program	shared with Ben Affleck, Matt Damon, Chris Moore, Sean Bailey, Bob Weinstein, Billy Campbell, Elizabeth Bronstein, Eli Holzman, Tina Gazzerro and Tony Yates	
2003	British Academy Film Awards	BAFTA Award for Best Film	shared with Alberto Grimaldi	
2003	Producers Guild of America Awards	Outstanding Producer of Theatrical Motion Pictures	shared with Alberto Grimaldi	
2003	Saturn Award	Special Award	shared with Bob Weinstein	
2003	Academy of Science Fiction, Fantasy and Horror Films	Special Award	shared with Bob Weinstein	
2003	DVD Exclusive Awards	Producer Award	shared with Bob Weinstein	
2003	Academy Award	Academy Award for Best Picture	shared with Alberto Grimaldi	
2004	Primetime Emmy Awards	Primetime Emmy Award for Outstanding Reality Program	shared with Ben Affleck, Matt Damon, Chris Moore, Sean Bailey, Bob Weinstein, Bob Osher, Dan Cutforth, Jane Lipsitz, Tony Yates, Randy Sacks and Eli Holzman	
2005	Primetime Emmy Awards	Primetime Emmy Award for Outstanding Reality-Competition Program	shared with Bob Weinstein, Dan Cutforth, Jane Lipsitz, Jane Cha Cutler, Desiree Gruber, Heidi Klum, Shari Levine, Frances Berwick, Rich Bye, Rich Buhrman, Gaylen Gawlowski, Sebastian Doggart, Alexandra Lipsitz, Jennifer Berman, Barbara Schneeweiss, Eli Holzman	
2005	Primetime Emmy Awards	Primetime Emmy Award for Outstanding Reality Program	shared with Ben Affleck, Matt Damon, Chris Moore, Sean Bailey, Bob Weinstein, Bob Osher, Dan Cutforth, Jane Lipsitz, Andy Cohen, Frances Berwick, Dave Serwatka, Rich Buhrman, Gaylen Gawlowski, Kevin Morra, Casey Kriley, Jennifer Berman, Eli Holzman, Marc Joubert, Barbara Schneeweiss, Larry Tanz and Alexandra Lipsitz	
2006	Primetime Emmy Awards	Primetime Emmy Award for Outstanding Reality-Competition Program	shared with Bob Weinstein, Dan Cutforth, Jane Lipsitz, Heidi Klum, Jane Cha Cutler, Desiree Gruber, Rich Bye, Shari Levine, Andy Cohen, Frances Berwick, Rich Buhrman, Gaylen Gawlowski, Alexandra Lipsitz, Barbara Schneeweiss, Jennifer Berman, Noel Guerra, Steve Lichtenstein, Michael Rucker, Benjamin Mack and Andrew Wallace	
2006	News and Documentary Emmy Awards	Outstanding Historical Programming - Long Form	shared with Donny Epstein, Yeeshai Gross, Matthew Hiltzik, Robert M. Johnson, Ellie Landau, Jeff Tahler, Bob Weinstein, Joe Fab, Ari Daniel Pinchcot, Elliot Berlin	
2007	Primetime Emmy Awards	Primetime Emmy Award for Outstanding Reality-Competition Program	shared with Bob Weinstein, Dan Cutforth, Jane Lipsitz, Heidi Klum, Jane Cha Cutler, Desiree Gruber, Rich Bye, Rich Buhrman, Barbara Schneeweiss, Frances Berwick, Andy Cohen, Shari Levine, Casey Kriley, Alexandra Lipsitz, Michael Rucker, Benjamin Mack, Andrew Wallace	
2007	Producers Guild of America Awards	Outstanding Producer of Non-Fiction Television	shared with Jana Cha Cutler, Desiree Gruber, Heidi Klum, Dan Cutforth, Jane Lipsitz, Rich Bye, Rich Burhman and Gaylen Gawlowski	
2008	Primetime Emmy Awards	Primetime Emmy Award for Outstanding Reality-Competition Program	shared with Dan Cutforth, Jane Lipsitz, Heidi Klum, Jane Cha Cutler, Desiree Gruber, Rich Bye, Rich Buhrman, Barbara Schneeweiss, Andy Cohen, Shari Levine, Casey Kriley, Andrew Wallace, Michael Rucker, Benjamin Mack, Steve Lichtenstein	
2008	Christopher Award	Christopher Award for best feature films	shared with Denzel Washington, Robert Eisele, Todd Black, Kate Forte, Oprah Winfrey, Joe Roth, Molly Allen, Bob Weinstein and David Crockett	
2009	Primetime Emmy Awards	Primetime Emmy Award for Outstanding Reality-Competition Program	shared with Bob Weinstein, Dan Cutforth, Rich Bye, Jane Lipsitz, Jane Cha Cutler, Desiree Gruber, Heidi Klum, Frances Berwick, Andy Cohen, Shari Levine, Casey Kriley, Rich Buhrman, Michael Rucker, Andrew Wallace, Barbara Schneeweiss	
2010	Primetime Emmy Awards	Primetime Emmy Award for Outstanding Reality-Competition Program	shared with Bob Weinstein, Jane Cha Cutler, Desiree Gruber, Heidi Klum, Jonathan Murray, Sara Rea, Barbara Schneeweiss, Colleen Sands, Gil Goldschein, Sasha Alpert, Megan Bidner, and Lisa Fletcher	
2011	Producers Guild of America Award	Outstanding Producer of Live Entertainment & Competition Television Award	shared with Jana Cha Cutler, Desiree Gruber, Heidi Klum, Jonathan Murray, Sara Rea and Colleen Sands	
2011	Primetime Emmy Awards	Primetime Emmy Award for Outstanding Reality-Competition Program	shared with Bob Weinstein, Jonathan Murray, Sara Rea, Heidi Klum, Jane Cha Cutler, Desiree Gruber, JoAnn Alfano, David Hillman, Barbara Schneeweiss, Colleen Sands, Gil Goldschein, Lisa Fletcher, Sasha Alpert, Michael Carroll, and Trish Norton	
2012	Primetime Emmy Awards	Primetime Emmy Award for Outstanding Reality-Competition Program	shared with Barbara Schneeweiss, Gil Goldschein, Lisa Fletcher, Desiree Gruber, Colleen Sands, Sara Rea, Heidi Klum, Tim Gunn, Jonathan Murray, David Hillman, Bob Weinstein, Meryl Poster, Jane Cha Cutler, Rob Sharenow, and Gena McCarthy	
2013	Western Heritage Awards	Bronze Wrangler for best Theatrical Motion Picture	shared with Bob Weinstein and Quentin Tarantino	
2013	British Academy Film Awards	Alexander Korda Award for Best British Film	shared with Simon Curtis, David Parfitt and Adrian Hodges	
2013	Producers Guild of America Award	Milestone Award	shared with Bob Weinstein	
2013	African-American Film Critics Association	Cinema Vanguard Award	shared with Bob Weinstein	
2013	Primetime Emmy Awards	Primetime Emmy Award for Outstanding Variety Special	shared with James L. Dolan, John Sykes, Michael Dempsey, Dan Parise	
2013	Primetime Emmy Awards	Primetime Emmy Award for Outstanding Reality-Competition Program	shared with Heidi Klum, Bob Weinstein, Meryl Poster, Jonathan Murray, Jane Cha Cutler, Sara Rea, Colleen Sands, Rob Sharenow, Gena McCarthy, David Hillman, Desiree Gruber, Barbara Schneeweiss, Gil Goldschein, Teri Weideman, and Tim Gunn	
2014	Primetime Emmy Awards	Primetime Emmy Award for Outstanding Reality-Competition Program	shared with Bob Weinstein, Meryl Poster, Jonathan Murray, Sara Rea, Heidi Klum, Jane Cha Cutler, Desiree Gruber, Rob Sharenow, Gena McCarthy, David Hillman, Barbara Schneeweiss, Gil Goldschein, Teri Weideman, Rebecca Taylor Henning, Tim Gunn, and Sasha Alpert	
2014	Harvard University's Hutchins Center for African & African American Research	W. E. B. Du Bois Medal	rescinded in 2017	
2015	Christopher Award	Christopher Award for best feature film	shared with Theodore Melfi, Peter Chernin, Jenno Topping, Fred Roos, Ivana Lombardi, Bob Weinstein, Dylan Sellers, Don Cheadle, G. Max Brown	
2015	Capri Hollywood International Film Festival	Capri Producer Award	shared with Bob Weinstein	
2015	Primetime Emmy Awards	Primetime Emmy Award for Outstanding Reality-Competition Program	shared with Jonathan Murray, Sara Rea, Bob Weinstein, Meryl Poster, Heidi Klum, Mary Donahue, Jane Cha Cutler, David Hillman, Barbara Schneeweiss, Eli Lehrer, Desiree Gruber, Gil Goldschein, Teri Weideman, Sue Kinkead, Cosmo DeCeglie, Tim Gunn, Sasha Alpert	
2016	Primetime Emmy Awards	Primetime Emmy Award for Outstanding Reality-Competition Program	shared with Bob Weinstein, Jonathan Murray, Sara Rea, Heidi Klum, Jane Cha Cutler, Desiree Gruber, Eli Lehrer, Mary Donahue, David Hillman, Patrick Reardon, Barbara Schneeweiss, Gil Goldschein, Teri Weideman, Cosmo DeCeglie, Sue Kinkead, Sasha Alpert, and Tim Gunn	
2017	Primetime Emmy Awards	Primetime Emmy Award for Outstanding Reality-Competition Program	shared with Bob Weinstein, Jonathan Murray, Sara Rea, Colleen Sands, Heidi Klum, Jane Cha Cutler, Desiree Gruber, Mary Donahue, David Hillman, Patrick Reardon, Barbara Schneeweiss, Gil Goldschein, Teri Weideman, Cosmo DeCeglie, Sue Kinkead, Glenn Morgan, Blue, Tim Gunn	
