= Nightwatch (1994 film) =

- Danish film poster
- Danish: Nattevagten
- Directed by: Ole Bornedal
- Written by: Ole Bornedal
- Produced by: Michael Obel
- Starring: Nikolaj Coster-Waldau; Sofie Gråbøl; Kim Bodnia; Lotte Andersen; Ulf Pilgaard
- Cinematography: Dan Laustsen
- Edited by: Camilla Skousen
- Music by: Joachim Holbek
- Production company: Thura Film
- Distributed by: All Right Film Distribution
- Release date: 25 February 1994
- Running time: 104 minutes
- Country: Denmark
- Language: Danish
- Box office: 3,5 million $

Nightwatch (Danish: Nattevagten) is a 1994 Danish horror thriller film written and directed by Ole Bornedal. The film involves Martin (Nikolaj Coster-Waldau) who gets a student job as night watchman at the Forensic Medicine Institute. When making his rounds he finds he must go to where the deceased people are kept. At the same time, a series of murders occur among women in Copenhagen, while mysterious and unexplained things happen in the medical department.

Nightwatch was a success in Denmark and was shown at the Fantafestival in 1995. An English-language remake of the film was released in 1997, and a sequel in 2023; both were also directed by Bornedal. The original Nightwatch was included on a list of the top 100 Danish films as chosen by Kosmorama.

== Plot ==
Law student Martin Bork takes a job as a night watchman at Copenhagen's Forensic Medicine Institute, believing it will allow more time to study. As part of his nightly rounds, Martin is required to use a watchclock as he checks numerous locations throughout the hospital, including the morgue. The retiring watchman tells Martin a story about a scandal that once occurred in the institute, in which a night watchman engaged in necrophilia with corpses in the morgue; the incident was never publicized, however.

Meanwhile, a serial killer is scalping and murdering women in the city. One night, police superintendent Peter Wörmer arrives at the institute with the body of a recent victim, Inge. Peter tells Martin he once worked as the building's night watchman before joining the police. Later, while Martin is on duty, a pull-string alarm is activated in the morgue. When Martin goes to investigate, he finds his classmate and friend Jens, posed as a corpse under a medical sheet, playing a prank.

In their spare time, Martin and Jens challenge each other to a series of dares, with the loser being challenged to marry Kalinka and Lotte, their respective girlfriends. As the dares become more risky, Jens challenges Martin to have sex with Joyce, a young prostitute and heroin addict he has had relations with, using Martin's name as an alias. During a dinner, in which Martin goes by Jens's name, Joyce recounts that she suspects one of her clients may be the unknown serial killer who murdered Inge.

One night at the institute, Martin finds bloody footprints in the morgue, which he follows through the basement, leading to Inge's body propped up in a hallway. When he phones the on-call physician to inspect, the body and footprints have disappeared, and Inge's corpse is undisturbed in the morgue. Kalinka begins to worry that his job at the institute is affecting his psychological state. Kalinka insists on spending a night with Martin on the job. In the morgue, Martin and Kalinka have sex. The next day, Joyce visits Kalinka and reveals his and Jens's game of dares to her. Kalinka angrily confronts Martin.

At the institute, Martin is confronted by Wörmer, who notifies him that Inge's corpse has been disturbed and that semen was found in the freezer. Wörmer requests a semen sample from Martin for genetic testing. Shortly after, Kalinka goes to visit Joyce in her apartment, only moments after Joyce is murdered by an unseen client donning medical gloves. Inside the apartment, Kalinka discovers Joyce's body and glimpses the assailant's gloved hand gripping a door before fleeing. Joyce's killer is revealed to be Wörmer, who scrawls "Martin" on her pillowcase in blood and leaves behind Martin's semen on her body to frame him.

When investigator Rolf meets Kalinka and Jens, he informs them Martin's name was found at the crime scene. Jens insists Martin could not be responsible, as Joyce believed Martin's name was Jens. Meanwhile, while investigating the institute's employee records, Martin realizes that the unknown necrophiliac nightwatchman the retiring guard told him about is Wörmer. Moments later, Wörmer arrives and escorts Martin to the morgue. Kalinka arrives shortly after, and finds Martin attacking Wörmer. Believing Martin is guilty, she flees with Wörmer, who shortly reveals himself as the killer before attacking her. Jens arrives at the institute with Rolf during the chaos. After binding Martin and Kalinka, Wörmer allows them inside. He murders Rolf with a baseball bat before handcuffing Jens. While Wörmer returns to the morgue to kill Martin and Kalinka, Jens manages to free himself and shoots Wörmer to death with Rolf's gun.

Sometime later, Martin and Jens marry Kalinka and Lotte in a joint ceremony.

== Cast ==
- Nikolaj Coster-Waldau as Martin Bork
- Sofie Gråbøl as Kalinka Martens
- Kim Bodnia as Jens Arnkiel
- Lotte Andersen as Lotte
- Ulf Pilgaard as Peter Wörmer
- Rikke Louise Andersson as Joyce
- Stig Hoffmeyer as Rolf
- Ulrich Thomsen as (Bølle)
- Gyrd Løfquist as The Old Nightwatch
- Niels Anders Thorn as The Doctor

== Production ==
Director Ole Bornedal began writing the script for Nightwatch after the release of his television film Masturbator (1993). He was inspired to make the movie after a trip he made to a morgue in Copenhagen. He stated in an interview, "I went to this morgue in a city of one million people, and it was both scary and beautiful. It made me think about how, outside, there is this daily life going on, and suddenly you're standing in a cellar realizing this is where it all ends. It makes you think about life and how you're living it."

Bornedal also wrote much of the script at night. He states: "I was writing the story at night, in an office all by myself, sometimes until four in the morning. I didn't dare go out to my car because I would have to walk through all of these dark hallways." Principal photography would occur in Denmark in 1993.

== Release ==
The film was released in Denmark on 25 February 1994. Nightwatch was a success in Denmark where it sold 465,529 tickets. It later screened at the Toronto International Film Festival on 11 September 1994 as part of the Midnight Madness series.

The film was shown at the 1995 Fantafestival in Rome, Italy. The film was selected to be part of the 1994 Critic's Week at the Cannes Film Festival.

A DVD of Nightwatch was released in North America by Anchor Bay on 29 May 2001. The disc contains an audio commentary by Ole Bornedal and a theatrical trailer for the film. On 22 July 2025, Arrow Films released a Blu-ray edition paired with the film's sequel, Nightwatch – Demons Are Forever (2023).

== Reception ==
Ole Bornedal felt that Nightwatch was not "a great work of art, but it did help legitimize the idea that even European film art can make good use of generic stories." Nightwatch was included on a list of the top 100 Danish films as chosen by Kosmorama. Rikke Louise Andersson won the award for Best Supporting Actress for her portrayal of Joyce in the film at the 1995 Bodil Awards. Variety gave the film a fairly favorable review, referring to it as a "slickly made but fairly conventional tale".

On the review aggregator website Rotten Tomatoes, 63% of 8 critics' reviews are positive.

== Remake ==
An English-language remake of the film, also titled Nightwatch, was released in 1997 and directed by Ole Bornedal, but with a new script by Steven Soderbergh based on Bornedal's original film.

== Sequel ==
A sequel, Nattevagten – Dæmoner går i arv (Nightwatch – Demons Are Forever) premiered at the 2023 BFI London Film Festival, ahead of a theatrical release in Nordic countries in late 2023. It was written and directed by Bornedal and features Nikolaj Coster-Waldau, Kim Bodnia, Ulf Pilgaard, and Niels Anders Thorn from the original cast.

== Sources ==
- Hjort, Mette (2003). The Danish Directors: Dialogues on a Contemporary National Cinema. Intellect Books. ISBN 1-84150-841-1.
- Towlson, Jon (2021). Global Horror Cinema Today: 28 Representative Films from 17 Countries. Jefferson, North Carolina: McFarland & Company. ISBN 978-1-476-64352-6.
