= Mimic (film) =

1997 film by Guillermo del Toro

- Theatrical release poster
- Directed by: Guillermo del Toro
- Screenplay by: Matthew Robbins; Guillermo del Toro
- Story by: Matthew Robbins; Guillermo del Toro
- Based on: "Mimic" by Donald A. Wollheim
- Produced by: Bob Weinstein; B. J. Rack; Ole Bornedal
- Starring: Mira Sorvino; Jeremy Northam; Josh Brolin; Giancarlo Giannini; F. Murray Abraham; Charles S. Dutton; Alexander Goodwin; Alix Koromzay
- Cinematography: Dan Laustsen
- Edited by: Patrick Lussier; Peter Devaney Flanagan
- Music by: Marco Beltrami
- Production company: Dimension Films
- Distributed by: Miramax Films
- Release dates: June 1997 (Fantafestival); August 22, 1997 (U.S.)
- Running time: 106 minutes
- Country: United States
- Language: English
- Budget: $30 million
- Box office: $25.5 million

Mimic is a 1997 American science-fiction horror film directed by Guillermo del Toro in his English-language film debut, written by del Toro and Matthew Robbins, and based on Donald A. Wollheim's short story of the same name. The film stars Mira Sorvino, Jeremy Northam, Josh Brolin, F. Murray Abraham, and Charles S. Dutton. Its plot follows the creation of a genetically modified insect, designed to battle an infected cockroach infestation, that rapidly evolves and begins hunting humans.

Produced by Dimension Films and distributed by Miramax Films, Mimic premiered at the Fantafestival in June 1997, and released theatrically on August 22. It received middling reviews from critics, and only grossed $22.5 million on a budget of $30 million. Additionally, del Toro disowned the theatrical cut, stemming from clashes over creative differences with Dimension/Miramax heads Harvey and Bob Weinstein, later releasing a director's cut on Blu-ray in 2011. Two direct-to-video sequels followed: Mimic 2 (2001) and Mimic 3: Sentinel (2003).

== Plot ==
In New York City, cockroaches are spreading the "Strickler's disease" that is killing hundreds of the city's children. Unable to develop a cure for the disease, Dr. Peter Mann, deputy director of the CDC, recruits entomologist Dr. Susan Tyler. Dr. Tyler uses genetic engineering to create the "Judas breed", a hybrid between a mantis and a termite that releases an enzyme which accelerates the roaches' metabolism. The roaches burn calories faster than they can nourish themselves and thus starve to death; this eradicates the disease-carrying insects. Peter and Susan later marry.

Three years later, a priest is chased and dragged underground by an assailant. The only witness is Chuy, an autistic boy who refers to the attacker as "Mr. Funny Shoes" to his skeptical guardian, an immigrant subway shoe shiner named Manny. Later, friends Ricky and Alex sell a "weird bug" from the subway to Susan, on which she performs tests, and realizes it is similar to the Judas breed. Initially, she believes that this is impossible since the specimens she released were all female and designed with a lifespan of only six months, which should have ensured that the breed would die off after a single generation. Before she can examine the insect further it is stolen by a figure who escapes out the window. After informing the police, she consults with her mentor, Dr. Walter Gates, who autopsies a larger specimen found in the city's sewage treatment plants, and finds that its organs are fully formed, meaning the Judas breed is not only alive but has developed into a viable species, with a colony underneath the city.

Looking for more specimens, Ricky and Alex go down the tracks where they find an egg sac and are then killed by the same assailant. Meanwhile, Chuy enters the abandoned church of the dead priest to find "Mr. Funny Shoes" and is abducted. Peter, his assistant Josh Maslow and MTA officer Leonard Norton enter the maintenance tunnels to investigate. However, Peter and Leonard get stuck and send Josh for help. Susan encounters a shadowy creature in a trench coat on a train platform. She approaches the figure, which unfolds into an insect the size of a human being. The creature abducts Susan and carries her into the tunnels. Meanwhile, Josh almost finds a way out but is found by a Judas and killed. Manny also enters the tunnels in search of Chuy and comes across Susan, whom he rescues along with Peter and Leonard, and they barricade themselves inside a train car.

Susan surmises that the Judas breed's accelerated metabolism has allowed them to reproduce at an accelerated rate, causing them to evolve over tens of thousands of generations within only three years, developing lungs, allowing increased size, and the ability to mimic their human prey. The group formulates a plan to get the car moving: using the remains of a dead bug to mask their scent as they work, Peter will switch the power on, and Manny will switch the tracks. Susan projects that the Judas will spread throughout the tunnels and overrun the city unless they manage to kill the colony's single fertile male. While trying to reach the track switches, Manny finds Chuy who has survived due to his imitating the clicking noises the bugs use for communication. However, before they can escape Manny is killed by the male Judas. Susan, realizing Manny has been gone too long, goes in search of him but finds only Chuy. Leonard's injured leg starts bleeding heavily and knowing the smell will incite the creatures and endanger the group, he creates a diversion that allows the others to get away, before being killed. Peter finds a dumbwaiter and puts Susan and Chuy in it, but stays behind to destroy the breed for good. He is chased into a room where hundreds are nesting and blows them all up by setting fire to a loose gas pipe, before diving underwater to safety.

The male Judas escapes the blast and goes after Chuy but is distracted by Susan, who lures it into the path of an oncoming train, which runs over it. The two make it to the surface, with Susan assuming that Peter had died in the blast. She then sees what appears to be another Judas, only for it to be revealed to actually be Peter alive and well. The three then reunite and embrace one another.

== Cast ==
- Mira Sorvino as Dr. Susan Tyler
- Jeremy Northam as Dr. Peter Mann
- Josh Brolin as Josh Maslow
- Giancarlo Giannini as Manny Gavoila
- F. Murray Abraham as Dr. Walter Gates
- Charles S. Dutton as Officer Leonard Norton
- Alexander Goodwin as Chuy Gavoila
- Alix Koromzay as Remy Panos
- Norman Reedus as Jeremy
- Ho Pak-kwong as Preacher
- Glenn Bang as Yang
- Julian Richings as Workman
- James Costa as Ricky
- Javon Barnwell as Alex Davis
- Bill Lasovich, Doug Jones, and Roger Clown as 'Long Johns'

== Production ==
=== Casting ===
The character of Manny was originally written by Guillermo del Toro for one of his favorite actors, Argentinian Federico Luppi, whom he directed in Cronos (1993). However, Luppi's English pronunciation was not good enough for the film, so del Toro chose Giancarlo Giannini instead; in a 2013 interview del Toro confirmed the story and stated that what he misses the most about working in the Spanish language is the possibility of directing Luppi, for whom del Toro professes the utmost admiration.

It was the first major studio film role of actor Norman Reedus. He had also made an acting debut in the independent pictures Floating and Six Ways to Sunday (both released in 1997). His role in Mimic was shot after Floating, but before Six Ways to Sunday.

Two of the film's actors, Josh Brolin and Alix Koromzay, had previously starred in Nightwatch, another Dimension/Miramax horror film from the same year. Nightwatch's director Ole Bornedal, and cinematographer Dan Laustsen also worked on Mimic. The film was a remake of a 1994 Danish film by Bornedal, and like Mimic, it also had production difficulties stemming from the Weinstein brothers. Del Toro hired the Danish-born Laustsen for Mimic after seeing the work he was doing on the American remake of Nightwatch. Laustsen has since gone on to have a successful career in the United States, and has become Del Toro's regular cinematographer.

Del Toro originally wanted to cast Andre Braugher as Peter Mann, but was vetoed by the Weinstein brothers, who thought an interracial relationship would hurt the film's commercial prospects.

The film also features the first collaboration between Del Toro and his regular actor Doug Jones, who played one of the "Long John" creatures.

Rob Bottin was the creature effects designer for the film.

=== Filming ===
Principal photography occurred in Toronto, Canada, due to the city's similarities to New York. The film includes several examples of del Toro's most characteristic hallmarks: "I have a sort of a fetish for insects, clockwork, monsters, dark places, and unborn things", said del Toro, and this is evident in Mimic, where at times all are combined in long, brooding shots of dark, cluttered, muddy chaotic spaces. According to Alfonso Cuarón, del Toro's friend and colleague, "with Guillermo the shots are almost mathematical — everything is planned".

Miramax and Dimension Films bosses Bob and Harvey Weinstein repeatedly clashed with del Toro over creative differences. After Harvey saw early footage, there were fights between him and del Toro regarding the tone, with the former claiming the film was not scary enough. It has been reported that one day Harvey was so infuriated with del Toro that he stormed onto the Toronto set and attempted to instruct del Toro on "how to direct a movie", and later tried to get him fired. Following an intervention from lead actress Mira Sorvino, Weinstein backed down, and principal photography would be completed with del Toro as director in the winter of 1997. Producer B.J. Rack later compared making the film to "being a prisoner of [a] war camp", while del Toro stated in 2018: "The only time I have experienced bad behavior, and it remains one of the worst experiences of my life, was in 1997, when I did Mimic for Miramax. It was a horrible, horrible, horrible experience".

== Release ==
=== Director's Cut ===
The Weinsteins insisted on having control over the final cut, and del Toro later disowned the theatrical cut, but states that "Mimic is visually 100% exactly what I wanted... The movie is visually gorgeous and it has a couple of sequences I’m very proud of." In 2010, del Toro revealed that he had been working on a director's cut of Mimic and said: "It’s not exactly the movie I wanted to do, but it definitely healed a lot of wounds... I am happy with the cut". The director's cut runs for 112 minutes, six minutes longer than the theatrical release. It was released in 2011, initially exclusive to Blu-ray and is now available via various digital services, but has never been widely available on DVD.

=== Rights ===
Between the film's release and 2005, the Dimension/Miramax library was controlled by Disney, with Disney selling off Dimension in 2005 and Miramax in 2010. In 2016, Qatari company beIN took it over. In 2020, ViacomCBS (now known as Paramount Skydance) acquired worldwide distribution rights to the Miramax library and the pre-October 2005 Dimension library, after buying a 49% stake in Miramax from beIN. Paramount also acquired the rights to release future projects based on Dimension/Miramax properties.

=== Streaming and home media ===
The film has since been made available on their streaming service Paramount+, and in 2021, Paramount Home Entertainment reissued it on DVD and Blu-Ray. Kino Lorber later sublicensed the home video rights from Paramount and announced plans to release both the theatrical cut and the directors cut on 4K UHD.

== Reception ==
=== Box office ===
According to Box Office Mojo, its domestic gross is $25,480,490; it did not recoup its budget of $30,000,000.

=== Critical response ===
On the review aggregator website Rotten Tomatoes, 68% of 53 critics' reviews are positive. The website's consensus reads: "Mimic finds director Guillermo del Toro struggling to inject his unique sensibilities into a studio picture – and delivering just enough genre thrills to recommend." Metacritic, which uses a weighted average, assigned the film a score of 56 out of 100, based on 15 critics, indicating "mixed or average" reviews.

Roger Ebert gave the film three and a half stars, saying "Del Toro is a director with a genuine visual sense, with a way of drawing us into his story and evoking the mood with the very look and texture of his shots. He takes the standard ingredients and presents them so effectively that Mimic makes the old seem new, fresh and scary".

Audiences polled by CinemaScore gave the film an average grade of "C−" on an A+ to F scale.

=== Legacy ===
Mimic was planned as one of three 30-minute short films intended to be shown together. It was expanded into a full-length movie, as was Impostor (2001). The short film Alien Love Triangle remains a 30-minute short film, but has never been released publicly.

Bong Joon-ho cited Mimic as an inspiration for his monster movie The Host (2006).

== Franchise ==
=== Sequels ===
Two sequels followed, Mimic 2 (2001) and Mimic 3: Sentinel (2003), for direct-to-video release. Alix Koromzay reprises her role for the former, although neither feature the involvement of the original's creative team.

=== Television series ===
In 2020, a television adaptation/reboot was announced to be in development, with Paul W. S. Anderson directing the pilot. Anderson and Jeremy Bolt are executive producers, along with Jim Danger Gray who will also be showrunner of the series.

== See also ==
- Aggressive mimicry
- List of films set in New York City
- New York City Subway in popular culture
