= Dan Laustsen =

Danish cinematographer

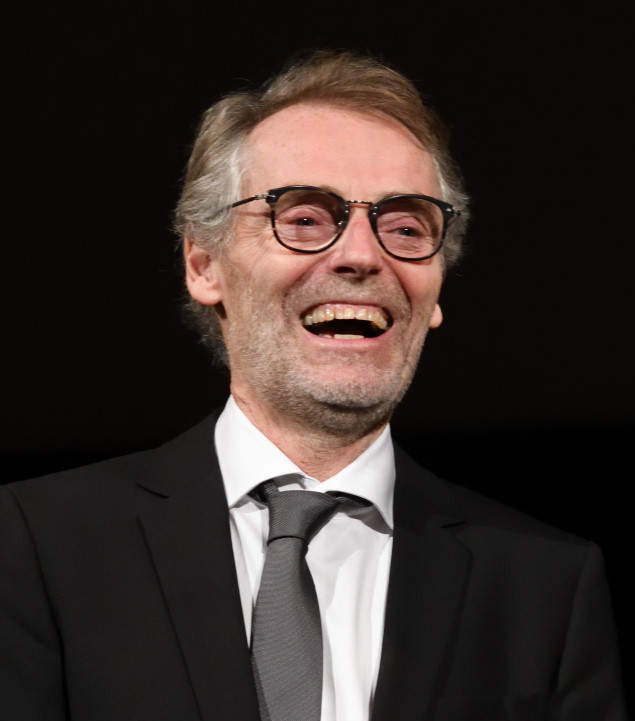
- Laustsen at the Stockholm Film Festival in 2017
- Born: 15 June 1954 (age 72); Aalborg, North Jutland Region, Denmark
- Education: National Film School of Denmark
- Occupation: Cinematographer
- Years active: 1978–present

Dan Laustsen, ASC, DFF (born 15 June 1954) is a Danish cinematographer, known for collaborations with directors Chad Stahelski and Guillermo del Toro, for which he earned three nominations for the Academy Award for Best Cinematography.

== Life and career ==
Laustsen was born in Aalborg, to Aage Aarup Laustsen and Ellen Laustsen.

He studied at the National Film School of Denmark from 1976 to 1979.

He is a member of the Danish Society of Cinematographers and the American Society of Cinematographers.

== Filmography ==
=== Film ===
Year	Title	Director	Notes
1979	Skal vi danse først?	Anette Mari Olsen	
1980	Danmark er lukket	Dan Tschernia	With Claus Loof
1981	Har du set Alice?	Brita Wielopolska	
1981	Gummi-Tarzan	Søren Kragh-Jacobsen	
1982	Den ubetænksomme elsker	Claus Ploug	
1983	Otto er et næsehorn	Rumle Hammerich	
1983	Isfugle	Søren Kragh-Jacobsen	
1984	Min farmors hus	Frode Højer Pedersen	
1985	Elise	Claus Ploug	
1985	Johannes' hemmelighed	Åke Sandgren	
1988	Skyggen af Emma	Søren Kragh-Jacobsen	
1988	Guldregn	Søren Kragh-Jacobsen	
1988	David eller Goliath	Anne Wivel	
1989	The Miracle in Valby	Åke Sandgren	
1991	The Boys from St. Petri	Søren Kragh-Jacobsen	
1994	Nattevagten	Ole Bornedal	
1995	Carmen & Babyface	Jon Bang Carlsen	
1997	Nightwatch	Ole Bornedal	
1997	Mimic	Guillermo del Toro	1st collaboration with del Toro
1998	Heart of Light	Jacob Grønlykke	
1999	Running Free	Sergei Bodrov	
2000	Dykkerne	Åke Sandgren	
2001	Brotherhood of the Wolf	Christophe Gans	
2002	I Am Dina	Ole Bornedal	
2003	Darkness Falls	Jonathan Liebesman	
2003	The League of Extraordinary Gentlemen	Stephen Norrington	
2005	Sex hopp & kärlek	Lisa Ohlin	
2005	Nomad	Sergei Bodrov; Ivan Passer	With Ueli Steiger
2006	Silent Hill	Christophe Gans	
2007	The Substitute	Ole Bornedal	
2007	Wind Chill	Gregory Jacobs	
2007	Just Another Love Story	Ole Bornedal	
2009	Deliver Us from Evil	Ole Bornedal	
2009	Headhunter	Rumle Hammerich	
2009	Solomon Kane	M. J. Bassett	
2011	Simon and the Oaks	Lisa Ohlin	
2012	The Possession	Ole Bornedal	
2012	Zaytoun	Eran Riklis	
2012	Sover Dolly på ryggen?	Hella Joof	
2015	Crimson Peak	Guillermo del Toro	
2016	The Lion Woman	Vibeke Idsøe	
2017	Dræberne fra Nibe	Ole Bornedal	With Linda Wassberg
2017	John Wick: Chapter 2	Chad Stahelski	1st collaboration with Stahelski
2017	The Shape of Water	Guillermo del Toro	
2018	Proud Mary	Babak Najafi	
2019	John Wick: Chapter 3 – Parabellum	Chad Stahelski	
2021	Nightmare Alley	Guillermo del Toro	
2023	John Wick: Chapter 4	Chad Stahelski	
2023	The Color Purple	Blitz Bazawule	
2025	The Gorge	Scott Derrickson	
2025	Frankenstein	Guillermo del Toro	
TBA	Highlander †	Chad Stahelski	Filming

=== Television ===
Year	Title	Director	Notes
1986	Guldregn	Søren Kragh-Jacobsen	All 6 episodes
1990	Strømerliv	Peter Ringgaard	Documentary series
1999	Dybt vand	Ole Bornedal	TV movie
2009	Please Help the World	Mikkel Blaabjerg Poulsen	TV short
2013	Wallander	Lisa Ohlin	Episode "The Sad Bird"

Miniseries

Year	Title	Director	Notes
1993	Den korsikanske biskopen	Søren Kragh-Jacobsen	
1996	Charlot og Charlotte	Ole Bornedal	Episode "Gud ser alt - osse selvom man ikke tror på ham"
2014	1864	Ole Bornedal	

=== Documentary film ===
Year	Title	Director	Notes
1984	Dansk bladtegning: danske bladtegnere - En dokumentation	Kirsten Stenbæk	Documentary short
1987	Ansigt til ansigt	Anne Wivel	
1991	Giselle	Anne Wivel	
1994	Om Søren Kierkegaard	Anne Wivel	
2011	Bag Blixens maske	Morten Henriksen	With Jon Bang Carlsen, Morten Søborg and Jan Weincke

== Awards and nominations ==
Academy Awards

Year	Title	Category	Result
2017	The Shape of Water	Best Cinematography	Nominated
2021	Nightmare Alley	Best Cinematography	Nominated
2025	Frankenstein	Best Cinematography	Nominated

BAFTA Awards

Year	Title	Category	Result
2017	The Shape of Water	Best Cinematography	Nominated
2021	Nightmare Alley	Best Cinematography	Nominated
2025	Frankenstein	Best Cinematography	Nominated

American Society of Cinematographers

Year	Title	Category	Result
2017	The Shape of Water	Outstanding Achievement in Cinematography	Nominated
2021	Nightmare Alley	Outstanding Achievement in Cinematography	Nominated
2025	Frankenstein	Outstanding Achievement in Cinematography	Nominated

Robert Awards

Year	Title	Category	Result
1984	Min farmors hus	Best Cinematography	Won
1988	Skyggen af Emma	Best Cinematography	Won
1989	The Miracle in Valby	Best Cinematography	Won
2000	Dykkerne	Best Cinematography	Nominated
2002	I Am Dina	Best Cinematography	Won
2007	Just Another Love Story	Best Cinematography	Won

Other awards

Year	Title	Awards/Nominations
1981	Gummi-Tarzan	Bodil Award for Best Cinematographer
2017	The Shape of Water	Dallas-Fort Worth Film Critics Association Awards; Los Angeles Film Critics Association Award for Best Cinematography; New York Film Critics Online for Best Cinematography; Nominated- Alliance of Women Film Journalists for Best Cinematography; Nominated- Austin Film Critics Association for Best Cinematography; Nominated- Critics' Choice Movie Award for Best Cinematography; Nominated- Chicago Film Critics Association Award for Best Cinematography; Nominated- Florida Film Critics Circle Award for Best Cinematography; Nominated- Houston Film Critics Society Award for Best Cinematography; Nominated- Online Film Critics Society Award for Best Cinematography; Nominated- Satellite Award for Best Cinematography
2021	Nightmare Alley	Nominated- Critics' Choice Movie Award for Best Cinematography; Nominated- San Diego Film Critics Society Award for Best Cinematography; Nominated- San Francisco Bay Area Film Critics Circle Award for Best Cinematography
