= Bob Weinstein =

American film executive (born 1954)

- Born: Robert Weinstein; October 18, 1954 (age 72); New York City, U.S.
- Occupations: Film producer; director; writer; businessman
- Years active: 1979–present
- Spouse: Anne Clayton (m. 2000; div. 2012)
- Children: 4
- Relatives: Harvey Weinstein (brother)

Robert Weinstein (born October 18, 1954) is an American filmmaker and businessman. He was the founder and head of Dimension Films and former co-chairman of Miramax Films and the Weinstein Company (TWC), all of which he co-founded with his older brother, Harvey. Bob Weinstein is also the founder of Watch This Entertainment. He had focused on making action and horror films, as well as on "family films, comedies and upscale adult thrillers".

== Early life ==
Weinstein was born in Flushing, Queens, in New York City. He was raised in an Ashkenazi Jewish family. His parents were Max Weinstein, a diamond cutter, and Miriam (née Postel). He grew up with his older brother, Harvey Weinstein, in a housing co-op named Electchester in New York City. and, like his older brother, he attended John Bowne High School.

== Career ==
Bob, his brother Harvey Weinstein, and Corky Burger independently produced rock concerts as Harvey & Corky Productions in Buffalo through most of the 1970s. Both Weinstein brothers had grown up with a passion for movies, and they nurtured a desire to enter the film industry.

In the late 1970s, using profits from their concert promotion business, the brothers created a small independent film distribution company called Miramax Films, named after their parents Miriam and Max. The company's first releases were primarily music-oriented concert films, such as Paul McCartney's Rockshow. In the early 1980s, Miramax Films acquired the rights to two British films of benefit shows filmed for the human rights organization Amnesty International. Working closely with Martin Lewis, the producer of the original films, the Weinstein brothers edited the two films into one movie tailored for the American market. The resulting film, released as The Secret Policeman's Other Ball in May 1982, became Miramax's first hit. The movie raised considerable sums for Amnesty International and was credited by Amnesty with having helped to raise its profile in the United States.

The Weinsteins slowly built upon this success throughout the 1980s with arthouse films that achieved critical attention and modest commercial success. Harvey Weinstein and Miramax Films gained wider attention in 1988 with the release of Errol Morris's documentary The Thin Blue Line, which detailed the struggle of Randall Adams, a wrongfully convicted inmate sentenced to death row. The publicity that soon surrounded the case resulted in Adams' release and nationwide publicity for Miramax Films. The following year, their successful launch release of Steven Soderbergh's Sex, Lies, and Videotape propelled Miramax Films to become the most successful independent studio in America.

Miramax Films continued to grow its library of films and directors until 1993 when Disney offered Harvey and Bob $80 million for ownership of Miramax Films. Agreeing to the deal that would cement their Hollywood clout and ensure that they would remain at the head of their company, Miramax Films followed the next year with their first blockbuster, Quentin Tarantino's Pulp Fiction.

1996 brought Miramax Films's first Academy Award for Best Picture with the victory of The English Patient. This would start a string of critical successes that would include Good Will Hunting and Shakespeare in Love.

On March 29, 2005, it was announced that the Weinstein brothers would leave Miramax Films on September 30 and would form their own production company, The Weinstein Company (TWC). Five years later, in 2010, Disney sold Miramax Films to private equity firm Filmyard Holdings (a joint venture between Colony Capital, Tutor-Saliba Corporation and Qatar Investment Authority). Filmyard in turn sold it to Qatari entity beIN Media Group in 2016, who later sold a 49% stake to ViacomCBS (now known as Paramount Skydance).

On December 4, 2017, Bob Weinstein filed a trademark application for Watch This Entertainment. Almost two years later, on October 12, 2019, Weinstein announced his new production company to the world, with a focus on "family films, comedies and upscale adult thrillers", and a first project of an animated feature titled Endangered, with Téa Leoni serving as co-producer and voicing a lead character. No news has been heard since that announcement, however.

== Personal life ==
Weinstein has been married and divorced twice. He married Anne Clayton, a former book editor, in 2000. They lived in a large apartment in The Beresford at 7 West 81st Street on the Upper West Side. Clayton filed for divorce in April 2012, and sought a protective order because she feared "bodily harm". Weinstein issued a statement from Washington-based interventionist Don Sloane, denying that Weinstein was a danger to his wife, and alleging that she was reacting to a family intervention conducted to address her alcoholism. Clayton's lawyers denied that she suffered from any addiction and said that Sloane was her husband's "paid agent" and that the two had never met.

== Sexual harassment allegation ==
In October 2017, Weinstein was accused of sexual harassment by Amanda Segel, who had worked as a showrunner on the Weinstein Company-produced Spike TV miniseries The Mist. Segel alleged that Weinstein had made several unwanted sexual overtures to her beginning June 2016, continuing for three months. Weinstein's attorney Bert Fields issued a statement denying the allegations.

Segel's allegation came in the context of the much more high-profile sexual abuse cases against Weinstein's brother, Harvey. In October 2017, Bob spoke about the allegations of sex crimes against his brother, saying he was "sick and disgusted" by Harvey's actions. Bob denied any foreknowledge of his brother's crimes before the allegations became public, but acknowledged that Harvey had a history of extramarital affairs and verbal abuse towards family members, and claimed that he himself was subjected to Harvey's verbal and physical abuse. Bob further said he had rarely spoken to his brother in the previous five years because he "could not take his cheating, his lying and also his attitude toward everyone".

== Selected filmography ==
=== Executive producer ===
Year	Film	Notes
1989	Scandal	Co-executive producer
1989	The Lemon Sisters	Co-executive producer
1990	Hardware	
1990	Strike It Rich	
1990	Crossing the Line	Co-executive producer
1991	A Rage in Harlem	
1991	The Pope Must Diet!	
1992	Dust Devil	Co-executive producer
1992	Into the West	Co-executive producer
1993	Benefit of the Doubt	
1993	The Night We Never Met	
1993	True Romance	
1993	The Hour of the Pig	
1993	Map of the Human Heart	
1994	Mother's Boys	
1994	Pulp Fiction	Co-executive producer
1994	Prêt-à-Porter	
1995	Smoke	
1995	The Englishman who Went up a Hill but Came down a Mountain	
1995	Blue in the Face	
1995	Things to Do in Denver When You're Dead	
1995	A Month by the Lake	
1995	The Journey of August King	
1995	The Crossing Guard	
1996	Beautiful Girls	
1996	The English Patient	
1996	Flirting with Disaster	
1996	The Pallbearer	
1996	Scream	
1996	Jane Eyre	
1996	The Crow: City of Angels	
1996	Emma	
1996	The Last of the High Kings	
1996	Victory	Co-executive producer
1997	Addicted to Love	
1997	Nightwatch	
1997	She's So Lovely	
1997	Jackie Brown	
1997	Good Will Hunting	
1997	Cop Land	
1997	The Wings of the Dove	
1997	Princess Mononoke	English-language version
1997	Scream 2	
1997	Air Bud	
1998	A Price Above Rubies	
1998	Phantoms	
1998	Senseless	
1998	Wide Awake	
1998	Ride	
1998	Since You've Been Gone	TV film
1998	The Mighty	
1998	Velvet Goldmine	
1998	Halloween H20: 20 Years Later	
1998	54	
1998	Rounders	
1998	Little Voice	Co-executive producer
1998	Talk of Angels	
1998	B. Monkey	Co-executive producer
1998	The Faculty	
1998	Playing by Heart	
1998	Shakespeare in Love	
1998	Heaven	
1999	Guinevere	
1999	She's All That	
1999	My Life So Far	
1999	Teaching Mrs. Tingle	
1999	Outside Providence	
1999	In Too Deep	
1999	Mansfield Park	
1999	Holy Smoke!	
1999	Music of the Heart	
1999	The Cider House Rules	
2000	The Crow: Salvation	
2000	Down to You	
2000	Scream 3	
2000	Love's Labour's Lost	
2000	Committed	
2000	Scary Movie	
2000	Chocolat	
2000	The Yards	
2000	Bounce	
2000	Dracula 2000	
2000	Malèna	
2001	The Others	
2001	Iris	
2001	The Shipping News	
2001	Spy Kids	
2001	Texas Rangers	
2001	Scary Movie 2	
2001	Jay and Silent Bob Strike Back	
2002	Chicago	
2002	Spy Kids 2: The Island of Lost Dreams	
2002	Below	
2002	Waking Up in Reno	
2002	Equilibrium	
2002	Confessions of a Dangerous Mind	
2002	Gangs of New York	
2003	Cold Mountain	
2003	Spy Kids 3-D: Game Over	
2003	My Boss's Daughter	
2003	Duplex	
2003	Scary Movie 3	
2003	The Human Stain	
2003	Kill Bill: Volume 1	
2004	Jersey Girl	
2004	Ella Enchanted	
2004	Fahrenheit 9/11	
2004	The Aviator	
2004	Finding Neverland	
2004	Shall We Dance?	
2004	Kill Bill: Volume 2	
2005	Sin City	
2005	Cursed	
2005	The Adventures of Sharkboy and Lavagirl	
2005	The Brothers Grimm	
2005	Underclassman	
2005	Proof	
2005	Derailed	
2006	Clerks II	
2006	Scary Movie 4	
2006	Pulse	
2006	Breaking and Entering	
2006	Miss Potter	
2006	School for Scoundrels	
2007	Grindhouse	
2007	The Mist	
2007	Rogue	
2007	Sicko	
2007	Halloween	
2007	Awake	
2007	1408	
2007	Who's Your Caddy?	
2007	The Nanny Diaries	
2008	Superhero Movie	
2008	Rambo	
2008	The Reader	
2008	Zack and Miri Make a Porno	
2008	Soul Men	
2009	Inglourious Basterds	
2009	Fanboys	
2009	Halloween II	
2009	Capitalism: A Love Story	
2009	Nine	
2010	Piranha 3D	
2010	The King's Speech	
2010	The Fighter	
2011	The Artist	
2011	Hoodwinked Too! Hood vs. Evil	
2011	Scream 4	
2011	Spy Kids: All the Time in the World	
2011	Apollo 18	
2011	Butter	
2011	I Don't Know How She Does It	
2011	My Week with Marilyn	
2012	Piranha 3DD	
2012	Silver Linings Playbook	
2012	Django Unchained	
2013	Escape from Planet Earth	
2013	Scary Movie 5	
2013	Lee Daniels' The Butler	
2013	August: Osage County	
2013	One Chance	
2013	Fruitvale Station	
2014	Vampire Academy	
2014	Sin City: A Dame to Kill For	
2014	Paddington	
2014	Big Eyes	
2014	Marco Polo	
2015	Woman in Gold	
2015	Southpaw	
2015	Carol	
2015	Macbeth	
2015	Burnt	
2015	The Hateful Eight	
2016	Sing Street	
2016	War & Peace	
2016	Lion	
2016	The Founder	
2016	Gold	
2017	Wind River	
2017	47 Meters Down	
2017	Amityville: The Awakening	
2017	Tulip Fever	
2017	Chandra Levy: An American Murder Mystery	
2017	The Current War	
2018	Hellraiser: Judgment	
2018	Children of the Corn: Runaway	
2018	Spy Kids: Mission Critical	
2019	Polaroid	

=== Producer ===
- Playing for Keeps (1986)
- Restoration (1995), co-producer
- Mimic (1997)
- Reindeer Games (2000)
- Master and Commander: The Far Side of the World (2003), co-producer (uncredited)
- Bad Santa (2003)

=== Director ===
- Playing for Keeps (1986)

=== Writer ===
- The Burning (1981)
- Playing for Keeps (1986)

=== Actor ===
- Scream: The Inside Story (2011) - Documentary film, himself

== Broadway credits ==
Note: In all productions Weinstein has functioned as a co-producer with other producers.

- The Real Thing (2000 revival) – play – produced by Miramax Films – Tony Award for Best Revival of a Play, Drama Desk Award for Outstanding Revival of a Play
- The Producers (2001) – musical – Tony Award for Best Musical, Drama Desk Award for Outstanding New Musical
- Sweet Smell of Success (2002) – musical – Tony Nomination for Best Musical, Drama Desk Nomination for Outstanding New Musical
- La bohème (2003 revival) – opera – Tony Nomination for Best Revival of a Musical, Drama Desk Nomination for Outstanding Revival of a Musical
- All Shook Up (2005) – musical – produced by Bob Weinstein & Miramax Films
- The Color Purple (2005) – musical

== Accolades ==
Year	Award	Category	Work	Result	Ref.
1996	Britannia Awards	Excellence in Film		Won	
1997	Gotham Awards	Career Tribute Awards		Won	
1998	GLAAD Media Award	Excellence in Media Award		Won	
2001	British Independent Film Awards	Special Jury Prize		Won	
2002	British Film Institute	British Film Institute Fellowship		Won	
2002	Hugo Award	Best Dramatic Presentation	The Lord of the Rings: The Fellowship of the Ring	Won	
2002	Primetime Emmy Awards	Outstanding Non-Fiction Program (Reality)	Project Greenlight	Nominated	
2003	Academy of Science Fiction, Fantasy & Horror Films	Special Jury Prize		Won	
2003	DVD Exclusive Awards	Producer Award		Won	
2004	Primetime Emmy Awards	Primetime Emmy Award for Outstanding Reality Program	Project Greenlight	Nominated	
2005	Primetime Emmy Awards	Primetime Emmy Award for Outstanding Reality Program	Project Greenlight	Nominated	
2005	Primetime Emmy Awards	Primetime Emmy Award for Outstanding Reality-Competition Program	Project Runway	Nominated	
2006	Primetime Emmy Awards	Primetime Emmy Award for Outstanding Reality-Competition Program	Project Runway	Nominated	
2006	News and Documentary Emmy Awards	Outstanding Historical Programming - Long Form	Paper Clips (film)	Nominated	
2007	Primetime Emmy Awards	Primetime Emmy Award for Outstanding Reality-Competition Program	Project Runway	Nominated	
2008	Christopher Award	Feature Films	The Great Debaters	Won	
2009	Primetime Emmy Awards	Primetime Emmy Award for Outstanding Reality-Competition Program	Project Runway	Nominated	
2010	Primetime Emmy Awards	Primetime Emmy Award for Outstanding Reality-Competition Program	Project Runway	Nominated	
2011	Primetime Emmy Awards	Primetime Emmy Award for Outstanding Reality-Competition Program	Project Runway	Nominated	
2012	Primetime Emmy Awards	Primetime Emmy Award for Outstanding Reality-Competition Program	Project Runway	Nominated	
2013	Primetime Emmy Awards	Primetime Emmy Award for Outstanding Reality-Competition Program	Project Runway	Nominated	
2013	African-American Film Critics Association	Cinema Vanguard Award		Won	
2013	PGA Awards	Milestone Award		Won	
2013	Bronze Wrangler	Theatrical Motion Picture	Django Unchained	Won	
2014	Primetime Emmy Awards	Primetime Emmy Award for Outstanding Reality-Competition Program	Project Runway	Nominated	
2015	Primetime Emmy Awards	Primetime Emmy Award for Outstanding Reality-Competition Program	Project Runway	Nominated	
2015	Capri Hollywood International Film Festival	Capri Producer Award	The Hateful Eight	Won	
2015	Christopher Award	Feature Films	St. Vincent	Won	
2016	Primetime Emmy Awards	Primetime Emmy Award for Outstanding Reality-Competition Program	Project Runway	Nominated	
2017	Primetime Emmy Awards	Primetime Emmy Award for Outstanding Reality-Competition Program	Project Runway	Nominated	
