= Søren Sætter-Lassen =

Danish actor (born 1955)

- Born: 11 July 1955 (age 71); Horsens, Denmark
- Occupation: Actor

Søren Sætter-Lassen (born 11 July 1955) is a Danish stage, film, show and television actor.

== Early life and education ==
Sætter-Lassen attended Tranegårdskolen in Gentofte and Gentofte State School, graduating in 1973. From 1975 to 1978, he trained at the Actors’ School at Odense Teater, after which he remained on staff at Odense until 1982.

== Career ==
=== Theatre ===
While at Odense Theatre, Sætter-Lassen portrayed Konstantin in Chekhov’s The Seagull in 1981. In 1982, he co-founded Grønnegårds Teatret alongside Christian Steffensen and served as its joint artistic director until 1991. During this period, he freelanced across Copenhagen stages, taking roles in works such as Onsdag at Bristol Teater, Klassefjenden and Majonæse at Aveny Teatret, Jacob von Thyboe at Grønnegårds Teatret and Mercedes at Rialto Teatret.

In 1990 Sætter-Lassen joined the ensemble of the Royal Danish Theatre, where his roles have included Don Carlos in Don Carlos (1999), the title characters in Jean de France (2001) and Uncle Vanya (2002), the lead in Sabre and Love (2003) and the General in Flugt (2004). He also appeared in Gud bevare Danmark at Østre Gasværk in 1999.

== Filmography ==
- Øjeblikket (1980)
- Pengene eller livet (1982)
- Ved vejen (1988)
- De nøgne træer (1991)
- Snøvsen (1992)
- Sort høst (1993)
- Snøvsen ta'r springet (1994)
- Det store flip (1997)
- Mimi og madammerne (1998)
- I Kina spiser de hunde (1999)
- Dybt vand (1999)
- Help! I'm a Fish (2000)
- Et rigtigt menneske (2001)
- Jolly Roger (2001)
- I Am Dina (2002)
- Oskar og Josefine (2005)
- De vilde svaner (2009)
- The Escape (2009)
- Klassefesten (2011)
- The Passion of Marie (2012)
- The Day Will Come (2016)

== Awards ==
- 2000: Reumert award for best supporting actor, Don Carlos
- 2010: Reumert award for best actor, Richard III
