= Funen Opera =

Danish opera company performing in Odense Teater

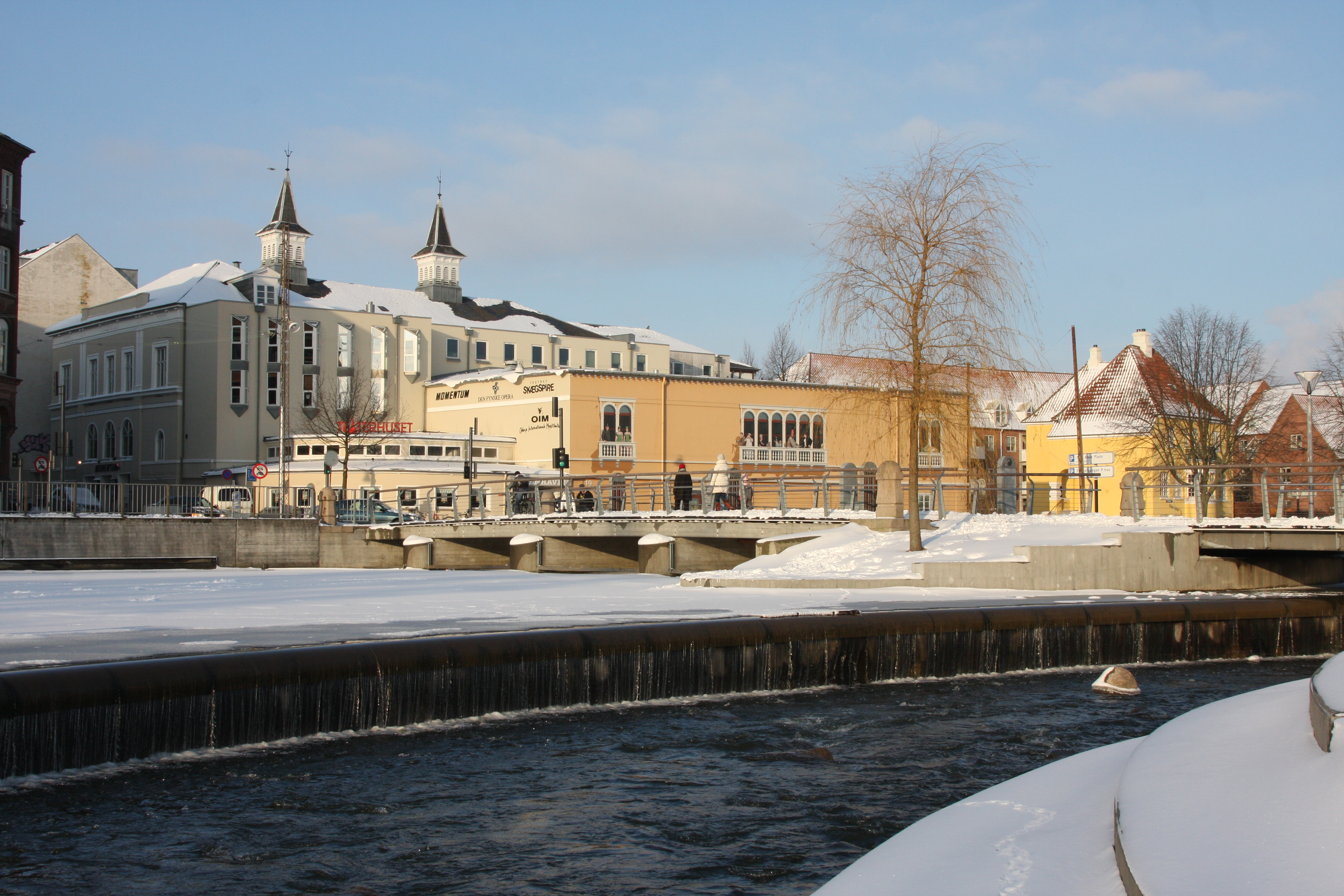
Funen Opera performs in the Odense Teater building

Funen Opera (Danish: Den Fynske Opera) is an opera company which performs in the Odense Teater located on Filosofgangen 19 in Odense, Denmark. It opened in 1948 with a presentation of La bohème but closed 16 years later as a result of inadequate support. It was re-established in 1996 by Lars Waage who served as creative director until 2007.

The main focus of Funen Opera is to communicate opera and music to the local audience. Located in the middle of Denmark, most of those in the audience are Danish. As a result, emphasis has been given to presenting works in Danish. Funen Opera has commissioned many contemporary works and invited many new and upcoming Danish artists and composers to perform there. The main supporter of Den Fynske Opera is Odense Municipality.
