= The Passion of Marie =

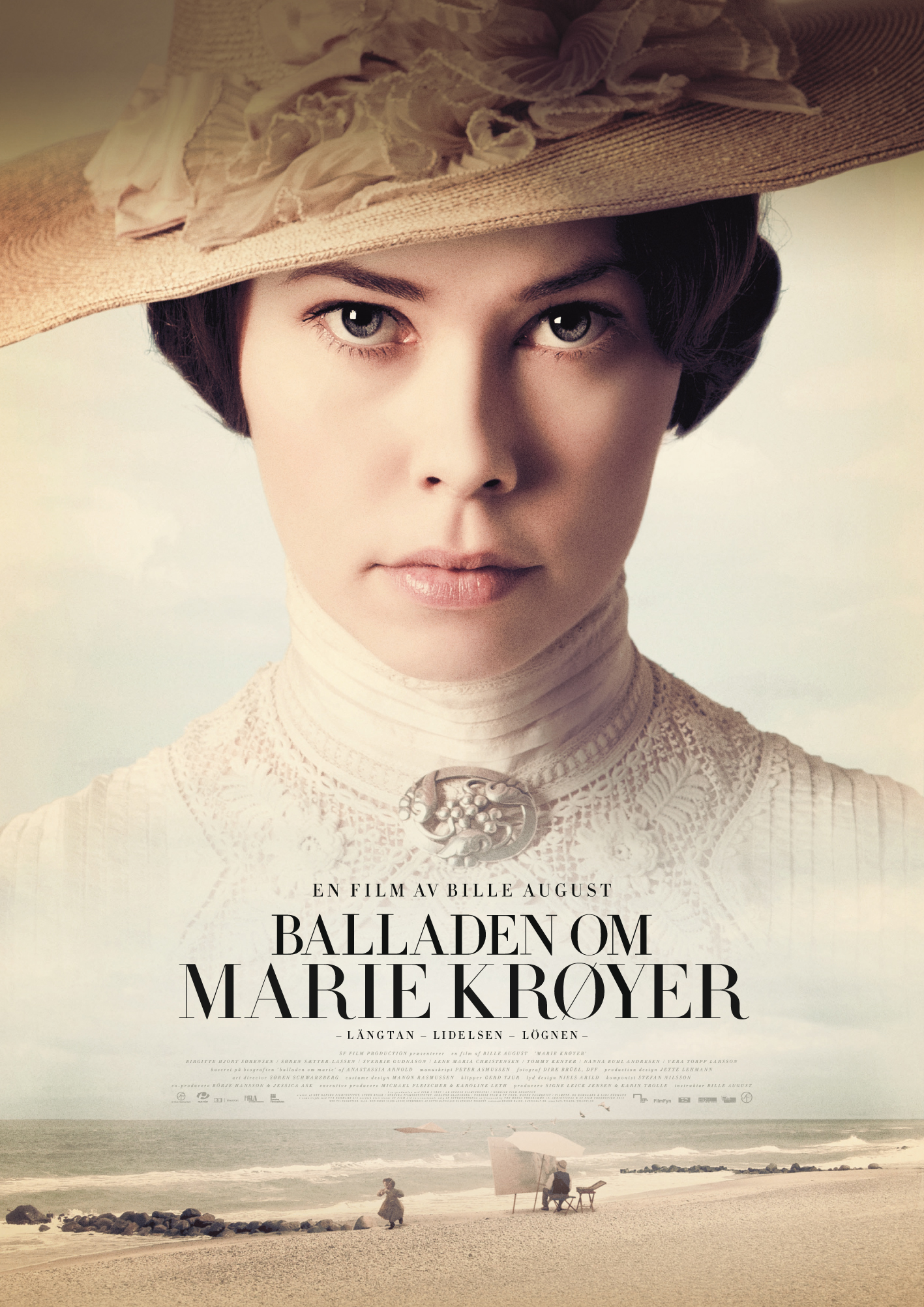
- Swedish theatrical release poster
- Danish: Marie Krøyer
- Directed by: Bille August
- Screenplay by: Peter Asmussen
- Based on: Balladen om Marie by Anastassia Arnold
- Produced by: Signe Leick Jensen; Karin Trolle
- Starring: Birgitte Hjort Sørensen; Søren Sætter-Lassen; Sverrir Gudnason; Lene Maria Christensen; Tommy Kenter; Nanna Buhl Andresen; Vera Torpp Larsson
- Cinematography: Dirk Brüel
- Edited by: Gerd Tjur
- Music by: Stefan Nilsson
- Production company: SF Film Production
- Distributed by: SF Film Distribution
- Release dates: 27 September 2012 (Denmark); 12 October 2012 (Sweden)
- Running time: 100 minutes
- Countries: Denmark; Sweden
- Languages: Danish; Swedish

The Passion of Marie (Danish: Marie Krøyer; Swedish: Balladen om Marie Krøyer) is a 2012 biographical drama film directed by Bille August, starring Birgitte Hjort Sørensen and Søren Sætter-Lassen. The film's Danish working title, Balladen om Marie, means The Ballad of Marie. It tells the story of the stormy relationship between Marie Krøyer and Peder Severin Krøyer, two of the Skagen Painters, in the late 19th century.

== Cast ==
- Birgitte Hjort Sørensen as Marie Krøyer
- Søren Sætter-Lassen as P.S. Krøyer
- Tommy Kenter as Lachmann
- Lene Maria Christensen as Anna Norrie
- Sverrir Gudnason as Hugo Alfvén
- Nanna Buhl Andresen as Henny Brodersen

== Production ==
Based on the 1999 biography by Anastassia Arnold, The Passion of Marie was Bille August's first Danish film production since Pelle the Conqueror from 1987. It was produced through SF Film Production—the Danish subsidiary of AB Svensk Filmindustri—with support from the Danish Film Institute. It received 1.75 million Norwegian kronor from Nordisk Film & TV Fond. Principal photography began in August 2011, on location in Skagen and Marstrand.

== Release ==
The film was released by SF Film Distribution in Denmark on 27 September 2012 and in Sweden on 12 October 2012.

== See also ==
- Hip Hip Hurrah!, another film about the Skagen Painters
