= Dybt vand =

- Written by: Ole Bornedal; Ulf Ryberg
- Directed by: Ole Bornedal
- Starring: Jens Jørn Spottag; Lotte Andersen; Henning Moritzen; Søren Sætter-Lassen; Gerda Gilboe; Gyrd Løfqvist
- Music by: Marco Beltrami
- Country of origin: Denmark
- Original language: Danish

Production
- Producers: Svend Abrahamsen; Bo Leck Fischer; Magdalena Frau; Martin Ganz; Doris Kirch; Robert Stiemerling
- Cinematography: Dan Laustsen
- Editor: Rie Wanting
- Running time: 160 minutes
- Production company: Danmarks Radio

Original release
- Release: 31 March 1999

Dybt vand (English: Deep Water) is a Danish TV movie thriller from 1999, directed by Ole Bornedal. It was broadcast by DR1 as a two-part TV miniseries.

== Cast ==
- Jens Jørn Spottag
- Lotte Andersen
- Henning Moritzen
- Søren Sætter-Lassen
- Gerda Gilboe
- Gyrd Løfqvist
- Ulf Pilgaard
- Isa Holm
- Ditte Gråbøl
- Bjarne Henriksen
- Niels Anders Thorn
- Ulrich Thomsen
- Daimi Gentle
- Kjeld Nørgaard
- Marina Bouras
- Jens Arentzen
- Gordon Kennedy
- Beate Bille
