= The Substitute (2007 film) =

- Directed by: Ole Bornedal
- Written by: Ole Bornedal; Henrik Prip
- Produced by: Robert Tapert
- Starring: Paprika Steen; Ulrich Thomsen; Jonas Wandschneider
- Cinematography: Dan Laustsen
- Music by: Marco Beltrami
- Production companies: Thura Film; Ghost House Underground
- Distributed by: 20th Century Fox
- Release dates: 13 March 2007 (BUFF); 15 June 2007 (Denmark)
- Running time: 93 minutes
- Country: Denmark
- Language: Danish

The Substitute (Danish: Vikaren) is a 2007 Danish science fiction horror film directed by Ole Bornedal, and starring Paprika Steen.

== Plot ==
The story takes place in a small village in Denmark where an alien comes to Earth to learn about human emotions, but instead is thwarted by a young boy and his friends, who find out that she is part of an intergalactic expedition to collect specimens across the universe. It's up to Carl and his friends to save their town and the world. They try to tell their parents, but all of them scoff at the idea that their children would make up lies about their teacher.

== Cast ==
- Paprika Steen – Ulla Harms
- Ulrich Thomsen – Jesper Osböll
- Jonas Wandschneider – Carl
- Nikolaj Falkenberg-Klok – Phillip
- Emma Juel Justesen – Rikke
- Mollie Maria Gilmartin – Lotte
- Sofie Gråbøl – Carl's mother
