= Just Another Love Story =

- Directed by: Ole Bornedal
- Written by: Ole Bornedal
- Produced by: Michael Obel
- Starring: Anders W. Berthelsen; Rebecka Hemse; Nikolaj Lie Kaas
- Cinematography: Dan Laustsen
- Music by: Joachim Holbek
- Distributed by: SF Film
- Release date: 24 August 2007
- Running time: 100 min
- Country: Denmark
- Language: Danish

Just Another Love Story (Danish: Kærlighed på film) is a 2007 Danish romantic thriller film directed by Ole Bornedal.

== Cast ==
- Anders W. Berthelsen – Jonas
- Rebecka Hemse – Julia
- Nikolaj Lie Kaas – Sebastian
- Charlotte Fich – Mette
- Dejan Čukić – Frank
- Bent Mejding – Mr. Castlund
- Ewa Fröling – Mrs. Castlund
