= Nightwatch (1997 film) =

1997 American horror-thriller film directed by Ole Bornedal

- Theatrical poster
- Directed by: Ole Bornedal
- Screenplay by: Ole Bornedal; Steven Soderbergh
- Based on: Nightwatch; 1994 Danish film by Ole Bornedal
- Produced by: Michael Obel
- Starring: Ewan McGregor; Patricia Arquette; Josh Brolin; Lauren Graham; Nick Nolte
- Cinematography: Dan Laustsen
- Edited by: Sally Menke
- Music by: Joachim Holbek
- Distributed by: Dimension Films
- Release date: February 1997
- Running time: 101 minutes (final cut); 139 minutes (original cut)
- Country: United States
- Language: English
- Budget: $10 million
- Box office: $1.3 million (United States)

Nightwatch is a 1997 American thriller film directed by Ole Bornedal, written by Bornedal and Steven Soderbergh, and starring Ewan McGregor, Patricia Arquette, Josh Brolin, Lauren Graham and Nick Nolte. It was written by Bornedal and Steven Soderbergh. It is a remake of the 1994 Danish film of the same name, which was also directed by Bornedal.

== Plot ==
Law student Martin Bells is hired as a night watchman at a hospital morgue. A string of gruesome prostitute murders committed by a necrophiliac serial killer quickly point to him as the lead suspect in the investigation carried out by Inspector Thomas Cray. At the same time, Martin slowly discovers clues that point to the real perpetrator.

== Cast ==
- Ewan McGregor as Martin Bells
- Patricia Arquette as Katherine
- Josh Brolin as James Gallman
- Lauren Graham as Marie
- Nick Nolte as Inspector Thomas Cray
- Brad Dourif as Duty Doctor
- Alix Koromzay as Joyce
- Lonny Chapman as Old Watchman
- Anais Evans as Leanne
- Robert LaSardo as Pub Thug
- Mongo Brownlee as Pub Thug
- Larry Cedar as Waiter (uncredited)
- Sandra Hess as Student (uncredited)
- John C. Reilly as Deputy Inspector Bill Davis (uncredited)

== Production ==
After the original Nattevagten found critical acclaim in 1994, Danish director Ole Bornedal was hired by Dimension Films (who had recently purchased the distribution rights for Nattevagten) to come to the United States and remake the film. The remake was intended to be the first of three films Bornedal would direct for Miramax, the parent company of Dimension.

Principal photography for the remake took place in Los Angeles, California, in the localities of Culver City and UCLA. It was the first American film made by Scottish actor Ewan McGregor, who used a fake American accent for the role of Martin Bells. At the time, he wanted to appear in off-beat, modestly budgeted American films, rather than typical Hollywood blockbusters, with McGregor even openly criticizing American films such as Independence Day in a June 1997 Entertainment Weekly interview. He told the publication, "when I met with agents in L.A., they would tell me you had to do two movies for yourself and then two for the business. And I thought, ‘F— off. No, you don’t. You do every film because you want to do good work. Because you’re interested in making good movies and working with good people.’ To do a crappy event movie for a lot of money, like Independence Day — I would never taint my soul with that crap." In another interview from this period, McGregor claimed, "I went to L.A. to make Nightwatch because I wanted to have the kind of exposure that would allow me to pick and choose my films. You can't do that if you just make little independent British features."

McGregor's initial impression of Los Angeles upon flying to the city was that It "looked like the world's biggest caravan park." McGregor said he started to miss the "plants and birds and rocks" of the Scottish countryside while making Nightwatch, which led to him frequently watching golf on television. In a September 1997 interview, Josh Brolin reflected on his role as Martin's best friend James, saying "my character has interior problems. He's dealing with lost identity, almost like an adolescent would in later life. He's constantly going outside himself, trying to fix that with alcohol, drugs, prostitution, whatever." Lauren Graham's character Marie, the girlfriend of James, works as a minister at a church, although all of these scenes depicting her in this job would end up being removed in the final cut. In an interview on the set of the film, Graham said, "it was interesting because when I interviewed a woman who's a minister at the Episcopal Church, I said 'you know I don't want to be representing the church here because it's a character who uses foul language, it's a person who's in a relationship with a guy who's doing terrible things', and she sort of said to me 'well especially as a young person involved in the church, the idealism is that you want to save everybody, the hope is that you can bring a community together', so it actually helps make sense the difficulties of their relationship and why she stays with him." Around the time Nightwatch was being made, Brolin and fellow cast member Alix Koromzay both got roles in the Dimension/Miramax sci-fi horror film Mimic. Bornedal and cinematographer Dan Laustsen (from the original Nattevagten crew) also worked on Mimic. Laustsen got hired for Mimic after his work on Nightwatch caught the attention of the film's director Guillermo del Toro, and Laustsen has since gone on to have a successful career in the United States.

Nightwatch took much longer to complete than originally expected, due to a series of test screenings and reshoots Miramax ordered. According to McGregor, one of these reshoots forced him to fly back to Los Angeles and cancel a two day holiday he had set aside for his wife and baby daughter. Changes made by Dimension to the finished cut included reducing the role of Marie, and adding a "more satisfying final scene". Bornedal went on to state that "the actual shooting of Nightwatch was terrific, everything was totally wonderful, and I was free to do as I pleased, but everything suddenly became extremely complicated during the post-production phase".

The co-writer of the film's script, Steven Soderbergh, is described as having "sanitized" the original 1994 script. For example, in the Danish version, there is a scene at a restaurant where the character Jens orders a prostitute to give Martin a blowjob. In the remake, Jens (now known as James) instead orders the prostitute to give Martin a handjob. Also added by Soderbergh were American pop culture references, including a scene where Martin mutters: "It's just like one of those movies on the USA Network, the hero sees something weird and no one will believe him". In another scene, James suggests to a thug at a bar that he could get him on a daytime talk show, and proceeds to reference Oprah, Phil Donahue, Ricki Lake and Sally Jessy Raphael. Soderbergh himself noted his frustrations at being forced to provide new script pages for reshoots that were going to be detrimental to the quality of the film. Bornedal said he, Soderbergh and David Bowie all saw the original cut of Nightwatch together and enjoyed it. Bornedal adds that the final version was the "fourth cut" of the film, and that "the American Nightwatch I did was not the Nightwatch that was released".

An opening credit sequence was designed by Kyle Cooper, who had also worked on the opening credits for other films, such as Mimic and Seven. It contained a photo montage of women with their eyes scratched out; as the killer's trademark in the film was to remove the eyes of his victims. Cooper then shot these images submerged in water, to give them an added layer of distance and make them ripple spectrally on the screen.

== Music ==
Nightwatch's background score was written by Danish composer Joachim Holbek, who, like many of the crew, was also involved in the original version. When Nightwatch was in the process of being re-edited by Dimension, Mimic and Scream composer Marco Beltrami was brought in to rescore several scenes. He also composed the score for a newly shot scene at the beginning of the film, involving the killer and a prostitute. Beltrami went on to score several of Bornedal's Danish films once he left the United States. While Martin is working at the morgue, there are sequences where he listens to licensed songs from alternative rock/electronic artists The Chemical Brothers, R.E.M. and Transister. The closing credits featured the song "Pain" by Super 8, an alternative rock band briefly signed to Hollywood Records in the mid-90s. Originally, songs by the band Garbage also appeared throughout, but they were later removed in post-production. To coincide with the film's debut, an accompanying soundtrack album was going to be released by Hollywood Records, a subdivision of Disney, which then owned Dimension/Miramax. However, plans for the soundtrack album were ultimately abandoned by Hollywood Records (though future plans for an archival soundtrack album may not be abandoned by Buena Vista Records).

== Release and home media ==
Nightwatch was first shown at film festivals, premiering at the 1997 Málaga International Week of Fantastic Cinema in Spain, where Bornedal won the Best Director prize. It was also screened at the 1997 American Film Market in Santa Monica, California. After several delays, the film then received an American theatrical run in April 1998, where it underperformed. Nightwatch was meant to build off the success of the Dimension/Miramax slasher film Scream, and was mainly promoted as a horror picture, with trailers for Nightwatch appearing on the original 1997 Scream VHS.

In 1998, Dimension and Buena Vista Home Entertainment released it to VHS, and then to DVD in 2000. It also received a Japan-only LaserDisc release in 1999, shortly before the discontinuation of the format. In 2005, Disney sold off Dimension, before selling off Miramax itself in 2010. That year, private equity firm Filmyard Holdings took over Miramax, in addition to gaining control of Dimension's pre-October 2005 library. A high definition print of the film was created around this time, being used on a Blu-ray released in Germany on June 21, 2012 and on a Blu-ray released in Spain on August 28, 2013. These European Blu-ray releases were handled by StudioCanal, on license from Filmyard Holdings. During March 2016, it was announced that Qatari company beIN Media Group had purchased Miramax from Filmyard Holdings. In April 2020, ViacomCBS (now known as Paramount Skydance) bought a 49% stake in Miramax from beIN, which gave them the rights to the Miramax library and the pre-October 2005 Dimension library, including Nightwatch. They made the film available on their streaming service Paramount+, and on February 23, 2021, Paramount Home Entertainment reissued the film on DVD, with this being one of many Dimension/Miramax titles that they reissued in 2020–21. In the 2020 deal, Paramount also acquired the rights to release future projects based on Dimension/Miramax properties, and have since distributed several new Scream films. However, these future film rights do not extend to the Nattevagten/Nightwatch property, presumably due to its Danish origins. In 2023, Bornedal went on to create a sequel to the 1994 Danish version titled Nightwatch: Demons Are Forever, which was done entirely in his native Denmark. In 2025, both the 1994 Danish version and Nightwatch: Demons Are Forever were bundled together on a Blu-ray release titled The Nightwatch Collection. This release was done by Arrow Video, and did not include the American remake.

=== Alternate versions ===
Three separate workprint versions exist, all differing significantly from Dimension's heavily edited final cut. A 38 minute longer version has surfaced on the internet, which includes numerous cut scenes taking place outside the morgue. It also includes a scene where Katherine has sex with Martin while visiting him at the morgue, and notably omits the opening scene with the prostitute, and the ending scene of the final cut. Several songs that were removed from the final cut, such as R.E.M.'s "Man on the Moon" and Garbage's "Only Happy When It Rains" and "Supervixen", also appear in this workprint. In the final cut, the Transister song "House to Myself" replaces "Only Happy When It Rains", while R.E.M.'s "The Wake-Up Bomb" replaces "Supervixen". Transister were a new alternative band with a female lead singer, and their sound was often compared to Garbage, another band which had a female lead singer. The decision to put Transister's song in the film was made by music supervisor John Houlihan, who was also the one that decided to Super 8's song "Pain" in the closing credits. In this workprint, R.E.M.'s "Man on the Moon" originally played as Martin is entering the morgue at night following a scene at his university with James, and in the final cut this song is replaced by a more frantic piece of instrumental music composed by Marco Beltrami.

Another workprint version runs 14 minutes longer and includes a completely different ending, where Martin and James have a double wedding with Katherine and Marie. A third workprint version is said to run nearly an hour longer than the final cut, although little is known of its content.

These alternate cuts have never been released in any official capacity, unlike with the alternate cut of Dimension's Mimic, a film made around the same time which shared several of the same cast and crew members. The director's cut version of Mimic was released in 2011, and later became the standard version used on home video and streaming services.

== Reception ==
Nightwatch was not well received. On the review aggregator website Rotten Tomatoes, 27% of 30 critics' reviews are positive, with an average rating of 4.6/10. The website's consensus reads: "Nightwatch loses much of what made its inspiration inspiring - and proves that when remaking a foreign film, hiring the original director is no guarantee of success." Metacritic, which uses a weighted average, assigned the film a score of 40 out of 100, based on 20 critics, indicating "mixed or average" reviews. Audiences polled by CinemaScore gave the film an average grade of "C−" on an A+ to F scale.

In June 1997, Playboy film critic Bruce Williamson gave Nightwatch three out of four stars, calling it an "eerie shocker", and remarking that "thrill seekers will be scared stiff before the killer even starts desecrating corpses in a diabolical spree." In his September 1997 review, James Kaplan of New York Magazine called Nightwatch a "subpar effort", writing, "instead, go see Ewan in full form as a disgruntled janitor who kidnaps his boss's daughter (Cameron Diaz) in A Life Less Ordinary."

In an April 1998 review, Stephen Holden of The New York Times criticized Nightwatch for "spending so much time churning up eerie atmospheric effects that it doesn't have time to develop its preposterous story in which Martin finds himself accused of the murders". Holden also called the film's climax "clumsily prolonged". On an episode of Siskel & Ebert, it received two thumbs down from Gene Siskel and Roger Ebert. Siskel commented that, "Nightwatch really offers the morgue as the only reason to watch. Some of the mayhem, like a blood spattered corpse of a teenage girl, is just disgusting. But no character is fully developed; just repetitive cheap thrills in a film that ultimately bored me." Roger Ebert's review for the Chicago Sun-Times states that "this film depends so heavily on horror effects, blind alleys, false leads and red herrings that eventually watching it stops being an experience and becomes an exercise". In a review for Variety, Leonard Klady claimed: "It’s not ideas that are lacking, but the connective tissue to give them life. The absence of even a vague unifying spirit reduces Nightwatch almost to the level of an intellectual 'snuff' film". Klady stated that he believed the film's cast had been underutilized, going on to write that "Patricia Arquette is squandered in the girlfriend role, and Brolin has more energy than focus in a badly conceived part". In spite of this, he praised Alix Koromzay's minor role as "a vulnerable and tragic teenage hooker". Marc Savlov from The Austin Chronicle commented that "Arquette and Brolin seem as though they're off in their own private universe".

Los Angeles Times writer Jack Matthews compared Nightwatch to the 1995 thriller Seven, mentioning that "like Seven, it mixes the styles of suspense, horror and film noir, using murky lighting, odd angles and deliberately paced camera movements to create an atmosphere of constant dread". But he went on to write that "at least [Seven's] villain was on a mission–to punish violators of the Seven Deadly Sins–that would be personally threatening to most members of the audience. The psycho in Nightwatch is a necrophiliac, the scourge of the county morgue, with the peculiar habit of killing and mutilating prostitutes before having sex with them".

A more positive review at the time came from Paul Clinton of CNN. He said that "Nightwatch is a fairly good effort" and that "the cinematography by Dan Laustsen and the lighting are excellent and add immensely to the overall tension of the piece". However, he too criticized the climax of the film, referring to it as "cartoonish". Like Clinton, Malcolm Johnson of the Hartford Courant commented on the lighting of the film in his review, writing: "True to his Scandinavian background, Bornedal has shot Nightwatch largely in semi-darkness, beginning with a violent murder in a prostitute's bedroom".

=== Legacy and comparisons to Nattevagten ===
Comparing the differences in tone between Nattevagten and Nightwatch, Tommy Gustafsson notes in his 2015 book Nordic Film Genre that "while the Hollywood remake opens immediately with a gratuitously gruesome murder, the 1994 Danish version builds a eerie mood much more slowly and is only a pure thriller in its last third". AllMovie claim "artistic elements of the original gave way to name actors, slicker production values, and the more conventional grindhouse genre approach, opening with a brutal prostitute murder in a pre-credit sequence".

Michael Obel, who worked as a producer on both the original and the remake, remarked in 2002: "The Danish version is better, we can surely agree on that. Several test screenings and re-editing ended up in a version that is less than optimum". In a 1999 interview, actor Nick Nolte revealed he had never seen Nightwatch, stating: "As the studio got it, they realized that they had a European-paced film, and they kept hacking at it and hacking at it". Ewan McGregor similarly remarked at the time that "this was the perfect example of a film they would not leave alone. There were constant reshoots, including the ending, and they took all the interesting stuff out, making it bland. The original concept was the reason I accepted it in the first place. I had massive strands of the character removed, which is insulting". In 2019, McGregor again spoke out against Dimension's post-production interference on Nightwatch, claiming Harvey Weinstein "ruined that film" and that Weinstein "made us reshoot everything — everything that was interesting about the film he replaced".

Both the original Danish version and the remake were profiled in John Kenneth Muir's 2011 book Horror Films of the 1990s, with Muir writing that it "didn't really need an American remake. The original didn't suffer in any sense (visually or narratively) from a lack of funds, so throwing money at the property doesn't really enhance the film to any great degree." He added, "Ewan McGregor, Patricia Arquette and [Josh] Brolin do a good job with their characters, but they are playing people more formulaic and less intriguing than the original cast did in 1994." In 2019, Rolling Stone ranked all 56 films Ewan McGregor had starred in at that point, placing Nightwatch 49th, and writing, "the whole thing alternates between campy grotesque and chilly humorlessness, and while McGregor brings conviction to his part, he’s seems to exist only in relation to the other characters in the film." In 2022, Looper ranked all 58 Ewan McGregor films, also placing Nightwatch at 49th. They state that, "McGregor is far from terrible here, but he gets let down by shoddy filmmaking. The likes of Patricia Arquette and Josh Brolin are also misused and underutilized."
