= Guard tour patrol system =

System for logging the rounds made by security guards and other patrolling staff

A guard tour patrol system is a system for logging the rounds of personnel such as security guards on patrol, technicians monitoring climate-controlled environments, and correctional officers checking prisoner living areas. It records the time at which an employee reaches each checkpoint on a route, helping to ensure that rounds are made at the intended intervals and providing a record that can be used for legal or insurance purposes.

== History ==
Early guard tour systems used a mechanical watchclock (also called a watchman's clock or patrol clock). The guard carried the clock on the round and, at each checkpoint, inserted and turned a numbered key—usually chained in place—which imprinted its number on a pre-printed paper disc or tape inside the clock, recording the time of passage. Detex, the largest United States manufacturer, discontinued its mechanical watchclocks at the end of 2011, including the Detex Newman, which had been produced for about 130 years.

The first electronic systems replaced the watchclock with a handheld reader or "log station": the guard touched the reader to a contact or RFID tag at each checkpoint, and the stored reads were later downloaded from the device at a docking station to produce reports. Computerized systems of this kind were first introduced in Europe in the early 1980s and in North America in 1986. Because such standalone collectors could not provide data until they were physically downloaded, later systems moved toward real-time data capture using networked devices.

Many modern systems are based on smartphone applications: the guard scans a QR code or NFC tag at each checkpoint with a phone, which records a time stamp and uploads it, often in real time.

== Operation ==
Checkpoints are commonly placed at the ends of a route and at critical points such as vaults, specimen refrigerators, vital equipment and access points. The system records the checkpoint identifier together with the date and time; software then assigns each checkpoint a location (for example, "north perimeter fence" or "cell number 1") and produces summaries highlighting missed checkpoints or patrols. Some systems time the interval between checkpoints and dispatch other staff if a point is not reached within a set period, for example to check on the employee's well-being. Because routes may be in areas without network coverage, some applications record checkpoints offline and synchronize the data once a connection is available.

== Checkpoint technologies ==
Checkpoints have been implemented with several technologies, including contact keys such as iButton devices, magnetic strips, proximity tags such as RFID, NFC or Bluetooth Low Energy beacons, and optical barcodes and QR codes. Tag- and code-based checkpoints can be printed on stickers or embedded in inexpensive tags, allowing them to be placed almost anywhere and changed when routes are revised. Mechanical watchclock stations and standalone electronic readers, which required the data to be retrieved from the device after the round, have largely been superseded by RFID/NFC and QR-based methods read with a smartphone.

== Software ==
Guard tour software is available as desktop, client–server and web-based applications, and is increasingly delivered as cloud-based software as a service combined with mobile or fixed devices. Beyond logging checkpoints, such software is also used to record incidents and to provide monitoring and reporting of patrols.

== See also ==
- Watchclock
- Security guard
- Radio-frequency identification
- Near-field communication
- Real-time locating system
