= Watchclock =

Mechanical clock used by security guards to mark patrols

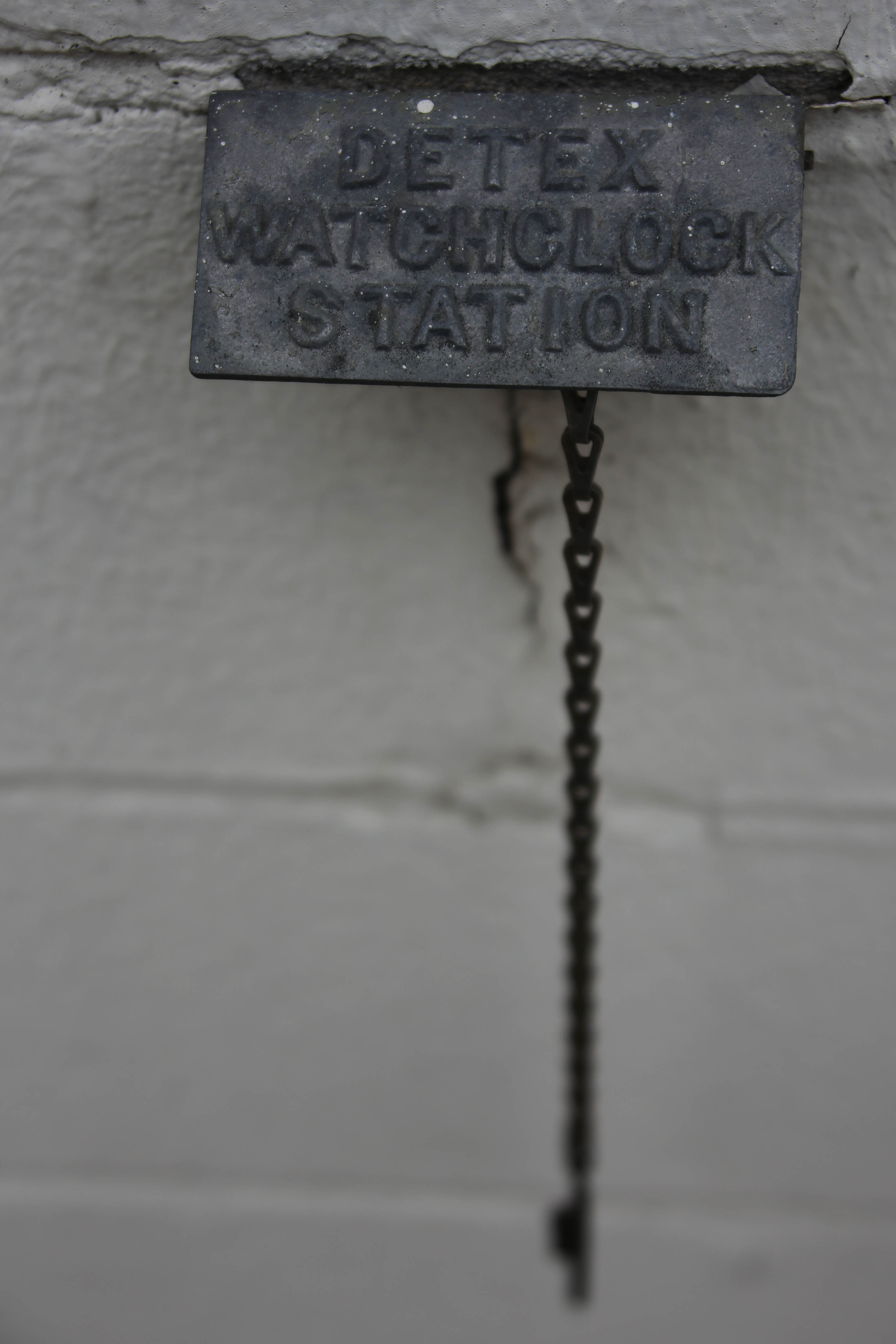
A watchclock station with key hanging on a chain

A watchclock is a mechanical clock used by security guards as part of their guard tour patrol system which require regular patrols. The most commonly used form was the mechanical clock systems that required a key for manual punching of a number to a strip of paper inside with the time pre-printed on it. Recently, electronic systems have increased in popularity due to their light weight, ease of use, and downloadable logging capabilities.

This increase in the electronic systems led the largest U.S. manufacturer of watchclocks, Detex, to discontinue all of their mechanical watchclocks on December 31, 2011, including the Detex Newman which had been manufactured for 130 years.

Watchclocks often had a paper or light cardboard disk or paper tape placed inside for a set period of time, usually 24 hours for disk models, and 96 hours for tape models. The user would carry the clock to each checkpoint where a numbered key was mounted (typically chained in place, ensuring that the user was present). That key was then inserted into the clock and turned, which would imprint the disk with the key number. The paper disk or tape had the times pre-printed and the key impressed the key number on the corresponding time. After the shift (or a specified time period, up to 96 hours in the case of the Detex Guardsman clocks), an authorized person (usually a supervisor), would unlock the watchclock and retrieve the disk or tape and insert a new one. In the case of Detex brand clocks, each time the cover is opened or closed, a mechanical device would puncture the disk or tape at the current time; if a disk had more than two perforations on it, it proved that the clock had been opened and possibly tampered with, or records forged.

The approximately five pound circular watchclock was enclosed in a black leather pouch attached to a leather strap and carried over the shoulder. Inside buildings mounted near doors, were watchclock stations consisting of a small metal box with a hinged lid, which contained a numbered key affixed by a twelve-inch chain. The watchman would insert the key into the clock, rotate it and a numeric stamp would be pressed onto a roll or disk of paper locked inside the clock.

== Gallery ==
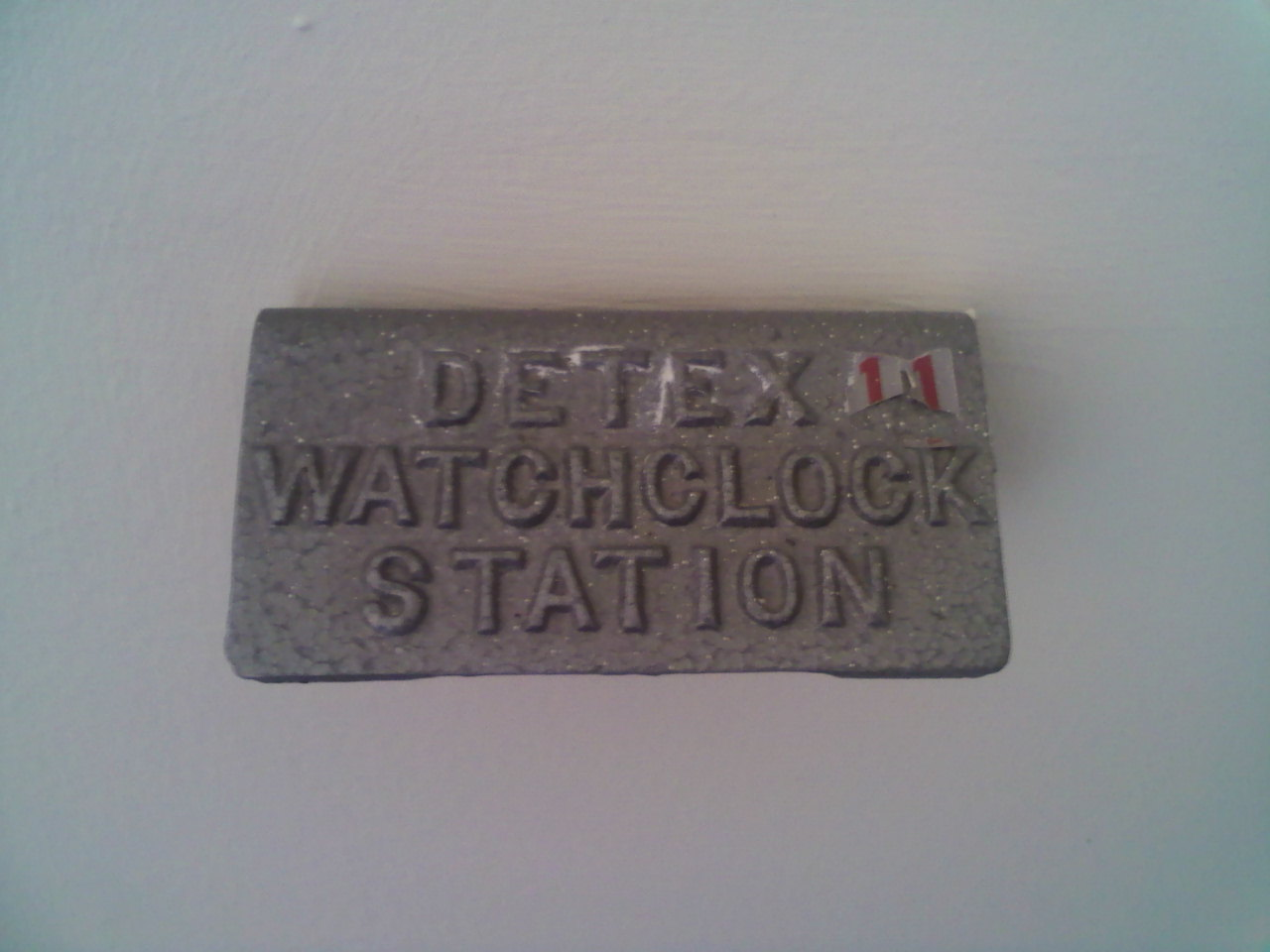
Detex watchclock station closed

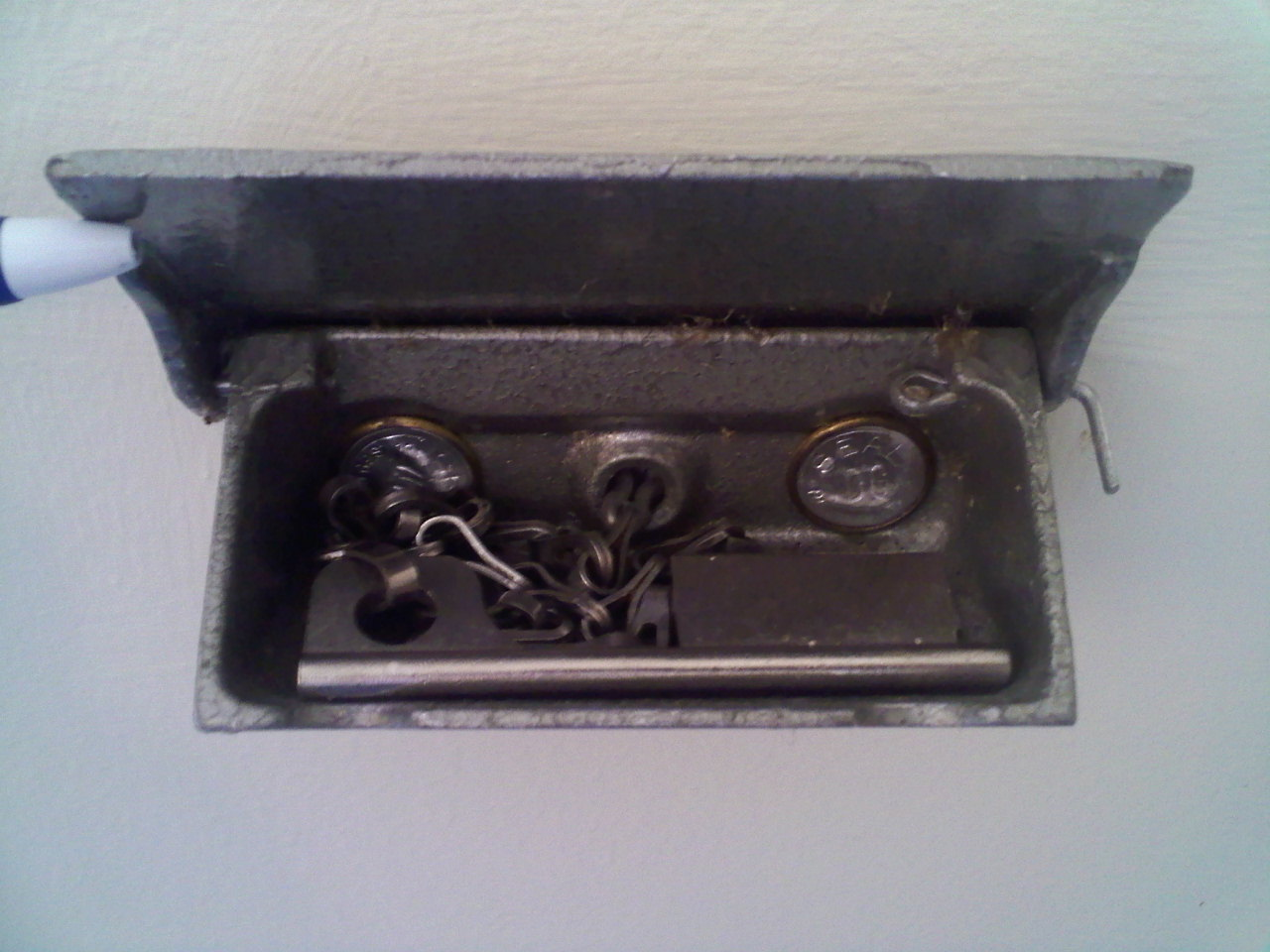
Detex watchclock station open

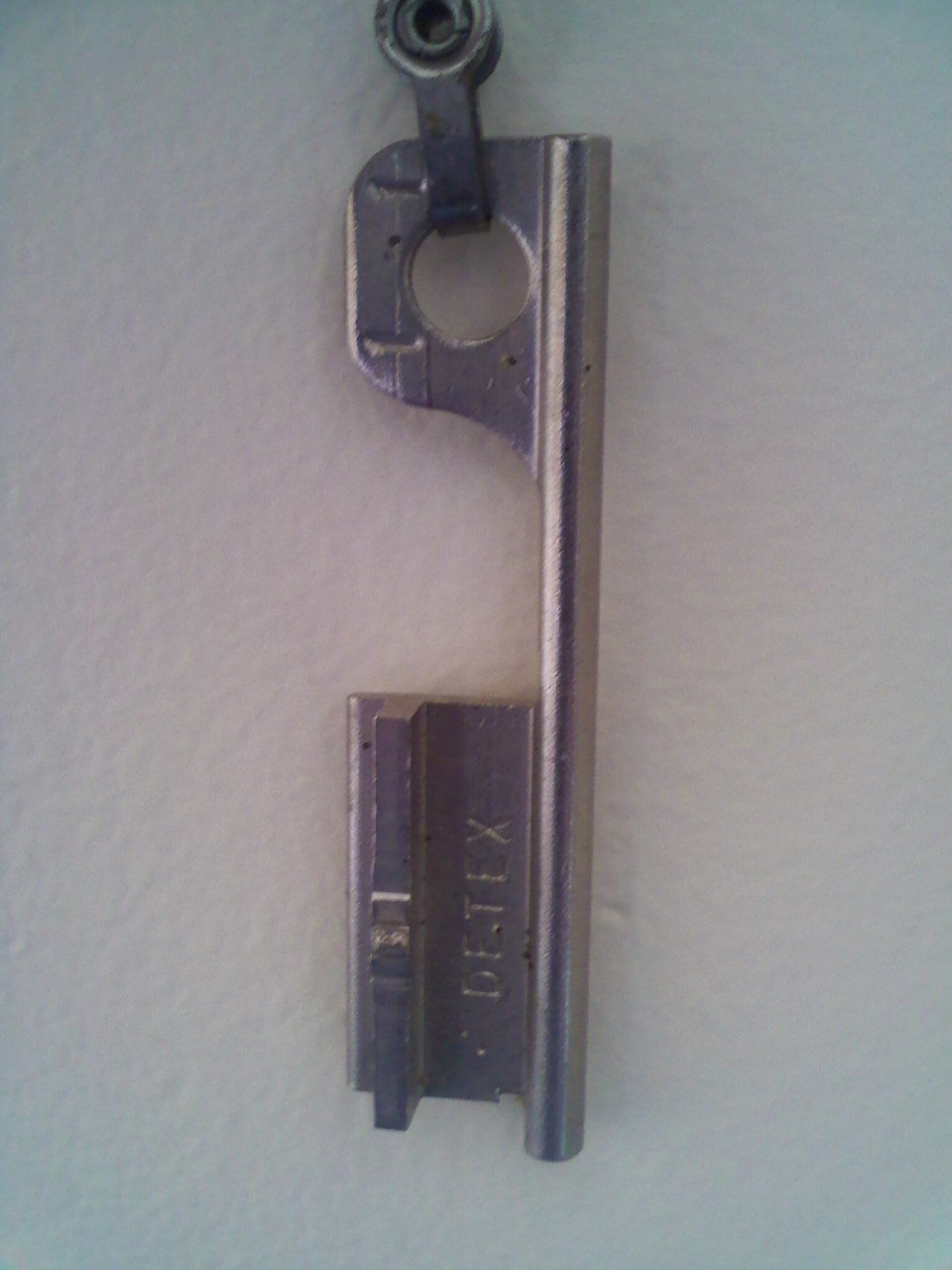
Detex watchclock station key
