= Angela Mazzarelli =

American lawyer

Associate Justice of the First Judicial Department
- Incumbent
- Assumed office 1994
- Appointed by: Mario Cuomo

Justice on the New York Supreme Court
- In office 1988–1994

Judge on the New York City Civil Court
- In office 1985–1988

Personal details
- Education: Brandeis University; Columbia Law School

Angela Mazzarelli is an associate justice of the New York Appellate Division of the Supreme Court, First Judicial Department.

== Early life and education ==
She attended the primary and secondary schools of the Southboro, Massachusetts Public School System. She is also a 1968 graduate of Brandeis University and a 1971 graduate of Columbia Law School.

== Legal career ==
She worked as a Staff Attorney for Bronx Legal Services between 1971 and 1973. She was then a Special Assistant to the General Counsel for the Housing and Development Administration. She was a Law Assistant to the Board of Justices of the Civil Term of the New York Supreme Court between 1973 and 1977 as well as a Principal Law Assistant to one of the Justices of the Supreme Court between 1978 and 1980. She worked in private practice between 1980 and 1985.

She subsequently served on the New York City Civil Court between 1985 and 1988. She was a New York Supreme Court Justice from 1988 to 1994. She was designated a Justice for the Appellate Division, First Judicial Department in 1994 by Governor Mario Cuomo.
