= Ole Bornedal =

Danish film director, actor and producer

- Born: 26 May 1959 (age 67); Nørresundby, Denmark
- Occupation: Film director
- Spouse: Helle Fagralid

Ole Bornedal (born 26 May 1959) is a Danish film director, actor and producer.

== Life and career ==
Bornedal was born in Nørresundby, Denmark. He wrote and directed Nattevagten (Nightwatch, 1994), a thriller about a law student who works in a morgue as a night-watchman, and becomes implicated in a series of murders of prostitutes. He also directed an English language remake (Nightwatch) in 1997, starring Ewan McGregor, Nick Nolte and Patricia Arquette. In 2002, he directed I Am Dina. Other Danish films include The Substitute (2007), Just Another Love Story (2007), and Deliver Us from Evil. He directed the English-language film The Possession (2012) and was one of the producers of the horror film Mimic. In 2014 he wrote and directed the epic historical drama 1864, the most expensive Danish TV series in history, chronicling the Second Schleswig War through the story of two brothers.

He is married to the Danish actress, Helle Fagralid, and has three children.

== Filmography ==
Film

Year	Title	Director	Writer	Producer
1994	Nattevagten	Yes	Yes	No
1997	Mimic	No	No	Yes
1997	Nightwatch	Yes	Yes	No
2002	I Am Dina	Yes	Yes	No
2007	The Substitute	Yes	Yes	No
2007	Just Another Love Story	Yes	Yes	No
2009	Fri os fra det onde	Yes	Yes	No
2012	The Possession	Yes	No	No
2017	Dræberne fra Nibe	Yes	Yes	Yes
2018	Så længe jeg lever	Yes	Yes	Co-producer
2021	The Shadow in My Eye	Yes	Yes	Co-producer
2023	Nightwatch: Demons Are Forever	Yes	Yes	No

Television

Year	Title	Director	Writer	Producer	Notes
1995	Sprængt nakke	Yes	Yes	No	TV short
1996	Charlot og Charlotte	Yes	Yes	No	Miniseries
2010	Vores krig	Yes	No	No	Episode "Kære Elena og Niels"
2014	1864	Yes	Yes	Co-producer	Miniseries

TV movies

Year	Title	Director	Writer	Producer
1989	The Dreamer	Yes	Yes	Yes
1993	I en del af verden	Yes	Yes	No
1993	Masturbator	Yes	Yes	No
1999	Dybt vand	Yes	Yes	No
