= Charlotte Strandgaard =

Danish author and director (1943–2021)

- Born: 15 February 1943; Brørup, Denmark
- Died: 9 October 2021 (aged 78); Rigshospitalet Glostrup, Copenhagen, Denmark
- Occupation: Author
- Political party: Socialist People's Party
- Parents: Jens Kruuse (father); Annabeth Kruuse (mother)

Charlotte Strandgaard (15 February 1943 – 9 October 2021) was a Danish author and director. She wrote more than 50 books, including novels, memoirs, reportage, poetry, and non-fiction. She was a member of the Danish Socialist People's Party, and was active politically on issues such as welfare, substance abuse, reproductive rights, and women's rights. She wrote and directed several screenplays, plays for the theatre, and audio dramas, and was a recipient of several awards, including an award for film production from the Danish Arts Foundation and several state scholarships for her writing.

== Personal life ==
Charlotte Kruuse was born on 15 February 1943 in Brørup, Denmark. Her mother, Annabeth Kruuse, was a translator, and her father Jens Kruuse, was a teacher, writer, and critic. She had an older brother, who died of meningitis when she was five years old. She grew up in Aarhus. She graduated from Aarhus Cathedral School in 1960, and moved to Copenhagen, where she met and married Ole Strandgaard, an ethnography student and curator, in 1962. She began to train as a librarian in 1962, and they had a son, Hans, in 1963. She and Ole Strandgaard divorced in 1969. In 1978, she married the director, Jakob Oschlag. They had twin daughters, Helene and Anne in 1979, and divorced in 1987. Her son, Hans Straandgaard died in 2013. Charlotte Straandgaard died on 9 October 2021 in Glostrup, Denmark, at the age of 78.

== Career ==
In 1965, Straandgaard completed her training as a librarian. She worked a scientific assistant at the Danish Royal Library from 1963 to 1968. She later worked in film and television in addition to writing and publishing several books that included fiction, non-fiction, and poetry.

=== Writing ===
Straandgaard has published over 50 books, including novels, memoirs, non-fiction, and poetry. Straandgaard's books grapple with issues of equity, justice, and discrimination, and she wrote particularly and frankly of the experiences of women, relationships, marriage and divorce. In a special article for her 70th birthday, Politiken described her books as "sobering and poignant," and the message that she conveyed to be "sympathetic and necessary."

She made her debut as a poet in the 1960s, writing frankly on subjects such as menstruation, sex, and feminine desire, which was uncommon at the time. She published her first collection of poetry, Katalog, in 1965, following it with three more poetry volumes titled Afstande (1966), Uafgjort (1967), and og Det var en lørdag aften (1968). In 1969 she published Indimellem holder de af hinanden (Sometimes They Care About Each Other), a collection of 81 short text pieces that narrated a complex relationship of love, sex, and emotions. The book was well-received and was republished in 2014. She continued to write poetry through her career, notably publishing Cellen in 1986, which dealt with themes of womanhood and malaise.

Her first novel, Når vi alle bliver mødre (When We All Become Mothers) was published in 1981 and dealt with themes of motherhood. She followed this with Lille Menneske (Little Man), 1982, which dealt with themes relating to anorexia, and En fugl foruden vinger (Birds Without Wings) in 1985, which dealt with surrogacy. Notable books include Næsten kun om kærlighed (Almost Only About Love) (1977) and Gode hensigter (Good Intentions), which dealt with loneliness and the internet, in 1998. In 1997, Straandgaard wrote Elleve Dage i November (Eleven Days in November), an experimental novel about substance abuse, serialising each chapter for publication online, and then taking the story forward after building on reader responses and comments. In 2007, Straandgaard published Pandoras æske (Pandora's Box), a depiction of a violent and traumatic divorce and the impact that it had on the children of the marriage.

Straandgaard has written several memoirs of herself and her family. She published Giv mig solen (Give Me the Sun), in 1986 and Og alt hans væsen (And All His Being) in 1988, both of which were autobiographical works. In 1996, along with Finn Slumstrup, she published I Lyset af Glæde (In the Light of Joy), a widely-read and critically received book in which she recounted the life of her father, detailing both, his knowledge, charm, and work as a critic and writer, as well as his history of engaging in fraud and forgery, notably including the creation of fraudulent checks while he taught at Aarhus University, and later, forging the signature of a principal at a school where he taught. In 2012, Strandgaard wrote an autobiography, titled Drømte mig en drøm (Dream Me a Dream). In 2014, Strandgaard published Hans, a memoir about her son Hans, who was diagnosed with schizophrenia, and died at the age of 49. The book grappled with themes of parenting, issues of mental health, and love. She had initially planned on writing the book together with her son, and they had collected documentation and research for the same before his death. Strandgaard wrote the book herself after his death, and included some of his poetry in the book, as well.

In addition to her work in fiction and poetry, Straandgaard researched and wrote several books consisting of reporting, interviews and narrative non-fiction, addressing social issues. In 1969, she published Herinde (In Here) which reported on urban drug addiction, and in 1973, she published Gade op og gade ned (Streets Up and Down) about the lives of female alcoholics. In 2004, along with journalist Poul Majgaard she published a book titled, Tænk, hvis det var dig (What if it was you?) which collected narratives from young people who had experienced bullying. During the 1980s and 90s, along with fiction, Straandgaard published a number of resources and self-help books for children and women in crisis.

Her last book, published in 2021, was titled Stræk din krop mod min (Stretch Your Body Against Mine) and was co-written with Johanne Kirstine Fall.

=== Theater, television and film ===
Straandgaard wrote several screenplays as well as directing films. In 1970, Straandgaard along with Franz Ernst wrote the screenplay for Ang.: Lone, a film directed by Franz Ernst. The film won a Special Recognition award at the 21st Berlin International Film Festival and was Denmark's entry for the Best Foreign Language Film at the 43rd Academy Awards. She wrote several films and television shows in Danish. These included Hvem myrder hvem? (Who Will Murder Me?) in 1978, which was a thriller about a whistleblower at a nuclear plant who reveals flaws in the plant's safety protocols. It starred Kirsten Peüliche, Margrethe Koytu, and Jesper Christensen and was one of the first films that dealt with the risks of nuclear power. in 1972, she wrote the screenplay for Nyheden, a film starring Morten Grunwald. Her credits as a director include an episode of the Danish TV serial, Nu-teater, which she also wrote, as well as a film in 1975 about an emerging generation of young poets in Denmark, including Knud Sørensen. In addition, Straandgaard has written several plays as well as audio-dramas.

In 1968, she received the Danish Arts Foundation's production prize. During the 1970s and 1980s, she held a number of positions in film, theatre, and television organizations, including in television company Dramaturgiat (1970–74), as a board member of the Danish Playwrights' Association (1973–85), at the Danish Film Institute (1975–76) and again with the Danish Playwrights (1987–89).

== Activism ==
Straandgaard identified as a socialist, and attributed her interest in socialism to her first husband, Ole Strandgaard. In the 1960s, while working at the Royal Library, she participated in a strike for better working conditions, and regularly participated in protests relating to labor rights as well as women's rights. During this period she volunteered as an ombudsman for child protection in a district of Copenhagen, and was an active member of the Red Stocking Movement, a women's right movement in Denmark. She was a board member of an organisation, Individ og Samfund, which was created in 1968 to advocate for women's reproductive rights, in response to the Danish Women's Society's reluctance to support this. She was an active member of the Liberal Socialists in her youth, and in 1989, she was the Socialist People's Party's candidate for the European Parliament, but was not elected. In 1968, along with Vagn Steen, she was one of the founding members of the Writer's Association, a group formed in opposition to the existing Danish Writer's Association. As a young woman, Straandgaard was famously photographed on 6 July 1970, with Ebbe Kløvedal Reich, Hans-Jørgen Nielsen and Klaus Rifbjerg, while smoking weed on the front steps of building housing the Danish government's Ministry of Culture as a gesture of protest against the Ministry's decision to deny aid to a theatre group, Secret Service.

Straandgaard has identified herself as a Christian, and has written about her faith in the context of grieving for her son's death.

== Awards ==
- 1968 - Prize for film production from the Danish Arts Foundation
- 1972 - Morten Nielsen's Memorial Grant
- 1983 - Danish Blind Society Radio Play Prize
- 1986 - State Art Foundation Scholarship, 1986
- 1986 - Thit Jensen's Forfatterlegat, 1989.

== Published works ==
- Pandoras æske, 2007, Borgen (Pandora's Box)
- Tro, håb og angst, 2005 (Faith, hope and anxiety)
- Tænk hvis det var dig, 2004 (faglitteratur) (What if it was you?) - with Poul Majgaard
- Uden hjem, 2001, Borgen (Without a Home)
- Sommetider lykkes det, 1999, Borgen (Sometimes it Works )
- Midt iblandt os er Guds rige, 1999, Borgen (Among us is the kingdom of God)
- Gode hensigter, 1998, Borgen (Good Intentions)
- Gråhårede børn, 1997 (Grey-Haired Children)
- 11 dage i November, 1997, Borgen (11 Days in November)
- Den grønne nøgle, 1995, Modtryk (The Green Key)
- Lille Menneske, (1982) Borgen (Little Man)
- Livsangsten, Gade op og gade ned, 1973 (Anxiety, Streets Up and Streets Down)
- Lykke lige nu, 1981 (Happiness Right Now)
