= List of submissions to the 43rd Academy Awards for Best Foreign Language Film =

1970 Best Foreign Language Film submissions

Highlights
- Oscar winner: (Italy) Investigation of a Citizen Above Suspicion
- Submissions: 13
- Debuts: none

This is a list of submissions to the 43rd Academy Awards for Best Foreign Language Film. The Academy Award for Best Foreign Language Film was created in 1956 by the Academy of Motion Picture Arts and Sciences to honour non-English-speaking films produced outside the United States. The award is handed out annually, and is accepted by the winning film's director, although it is considered an award for the submitting country as a whole. Countries are invited by the Academy to submit their best films for competition according to strict rules, with only one film being accepted from each country.

For the 43rd Academy Awards, thirteen films were submitted in the category Academy Award for Best Foreign Language Film. The five nominated films came from Belgium, France, Italy, Spain and Switzerland.

Italy won for the eighth time with Investigation of a Citizen Above Suspicion by Elio Petri, which was also nominated for Best Original Screenplay at the subsequent year (44th Academy Awards).

== Submissions ==
Submitting country	Film title used in nomination	Original title	Language(s)	Director(s)	Result
Belgium	Paix sur les champs		French	Jacques Boigelot	Nominated
Brazil	Mortal Sin	Pecado Mortal	Brazilian Portuguese	Miguel Faria Jr.	Not nominated
Denmark	Re.: Lone	Ang.: Lone	Danish	Franz Ernst	Not nominated
Egypt	The Night of Counting the Years	المومياء	Classical Arabic	Shadi Abdel Salam	Not nominated
France	Hoa-Binh		Vietnamese, French, English, Cantonese	Raoul Coutard	Nominated
West Germany	o.k.		German	Michael Verhoeven	Not nominated
Hungary	Lovefilm	Szerelmesfilm	Hungarian	István Szabó	Not nominated
Italy	Investigation of a Citizen Above Suspicion	Indagine su un cittadino al di sopra di ogni sospetto	Italian	Elio Petri	Won Academy Award
Japan	The Scandalous Adventures of Buraikan	無頼漢	Japanese	Masahiro Shinoda	Not nominated
Poland	Salt of the Black Earth	Sól ziemi czarnej	Polish	Kazimierz Kutz	Not nominated
Spain	Tristana		Spanish	Luis Buñuel	Nominated
Sweden	A Swedish Love Story	En Kärlekshistoria	Swedish	Roy Andersson	Not nominated
Switzerland	First Love	Erste Liebe	French, German	Maximilian Schell	Nominated

== Sources ==
- Margaret Herrick Library, Academy of Motion Picture Arts and Sciences
