= Think Tank on European Film and Film Policy =

Denmark-based think tank

The Think Tank on European Film and Film Policy is a think tank founded in 2007 to promote and develop the effectiveness of European Film Policy. It strives to generating change to ensure that filmmaking environments do not evolve into stagnant subsidy cultures. It is based at Filmbyen in Copenhagen, Denmark.

== Organisation ==
The president of the Think Tank is Henning Camre, previously the director of the Danish Film Institute.

The other members of the Board of Directors:

- Peter Aalbæk Jensen, chief executive of Zentropa (Denmark)
- Véronique Cayla, president of the Centre National de la Cinématographie et de l'Image Animée (France)
- Henrik Bo Nielsen (chair), Chief Executive Officer DFI.
- Ignasi Guardans, director of the Instituto de la Cinematografia y de las Artes Audiovisuales (Spain)
- Agnieszka Odorowicz, director of the Polski Instytut Filmowej (Poland)
- John Woodward, chief executive of the UK Film Council
