= Georges Poujouly =

French actor (1940–2000)

- Poujouly in Forbidden Games (1952)
- Born: 20 January 1940; Garches, France
- Died: 28 October 2000 (aged 60); Villejuif, France
- Occupation: Actor
- Years active: 1951–1991

Georges Poujouly (20 January 1940 – 28 October 2000) was a French actor who gained international acclaim as a child for his performance in the award-winning film Forbidden Games. In the 1950s, he appeared in a number of other high-profile films, notably Les Diaboliques, And God Created Woman and Ascenseur pour l'échafaud. His later career was spent mainly in television, where he specialised in voiceover work.

== 1950s ==
At the age of 11, Poujouly was chosen by film director René Clément for the role of Michel Dollé, befriender of the orphaned Paulette (Brigitte Fossey), in the World War II drama Forbidden Games (Jeux interdits). The film was not greatly successful on its original release in France, but struck a chord with audiences and critics in other countries and went on to win numerous awards, including the 1952 Academy Award for Best Foreign Language Film. Forbidden Games is considered a classic of French cinema, and the spare, haunting performances of Poujouly and Fossey among the most notable of screen performances by child actors.

In 1952, Poujouly played the role of Michel le Guen in André Cayatte's We Are All Murderers (Nous sommes tous des assassins). In 1954, he played the main character in a famous audio recording of Le Petit Prince by Antoine de Saint-Exupéry, alongside Gérard Philipe as the narrator. He played smaller parts in Henri-Georges Clouzot's celebrated 1955 suspense film Les Diaboliques and Roger Vadim's And God Created Woman (Et dieu...créa la femme) in 1956. A more substantial role, as a car thief turned killer, came in 1958 in the Louis Malle-directed thriller Ascenseur pour l'échafaud, with Jeanne Moreau and Maurice Ronet.

== Later career ==
From the 1960s, Poujouly worked mainly in television, with film appearances limited to small roles in such as Vice and Virtue (1963) and Is Paris Burning? (Paris brûle-t-il?) (1966). He appeared in a number of TV serials and moved into voice acting.

Between 1959 and 1962 Poujouly was the voice of Tintin in two animated series based on Hergé's books. In later years his voiceover credits included the Michael Douglas character Steve Keller in the French TV version of The Streets of San Francisco and Merry in the 1978 animated version of The Lord of the Rings.

== Death ==
Poujouly's last-known credit is Robinson et compagnie, a 1991 animated French language film version of Robinson Crusoe. Little is known of the last years of his life. He died of cancer, aged 60, on 28 October 2000.

== Selected credits ==
Film

- 1952: Forbidden Games (dir. René Clément) - Michel Dollé
- 1952: We Are All Murderers (dir. André Cayatte) - Michel Le Guen
- 1952: La Jeune Folle (dir. Yves Allégret) - Un enfant
- 1952: Her Last Christmas (dir. Jacques Daniel-Norman) - Raphaël Fabrèze
- 1953: Double or Quits (dir. Robert Vernay)
- 1953: Le Gang des pianos à bretelles (dir. Gilles A. de Turenne) - Jacky
- 1955: The Treasure of Bengal (dir. Gianni Vernuccio) - Tomby
- 1955: Les Diaboliques (dir. Henri-Georges Clouzot) - Soudieu, un élève
- 1955: Eighteen Hour Stopover (dir. René Jolivet) - Le gamin avec le capitaine
- 1955: Cortile - L'enfant de la rue (dir. Antonio Petrucci) - Ferdinando 'Nando' Rossi
- 1955: Il Piccolo Vetraio (dir. Giorgio Capitani) - Piero
- 1956: Si tous les gars du monde (dir. Christian-Jaque) - Benj - le mousse
- 1956: Les Assassins du dimanche (dir. Alex Joffé) - Julot
- 1956: And God Created Woman (dir. Roger Vadim) - Christian Tardieu
- 1957: The Ostrich Has Two Eggs (dir. Denys de La Patellière) - Roger Barjus
- 1958: Ascenseur pour l'échafaud (dir. Louis Malle) - Louis
- 1958: Guinguette (dir. Jean Delannoy) - François
- 1959: Pêcheur d'Islande (dir. Pierre Schoendoerffer) - Sylvestre Moan
- 1960: A Mistress for the Summer (dir. Edouard Molinaro) - Michel
- 1960: Vacances en enfer (dir. Jean Kerchbron) - Jean
- 1961: Une grosse tête (dir. Claude de Givray) - Georges
- 1963: Vice and Virtue (dir. Roger Vadim) - Lieutenant Hoech
- 1966: Paris brûle-t-il? (dir. René Clément) - Landrieux (uncredited)
- 1970: Paix sur les champs (dir. Jacques Boigelot) - Louis
- 1970: Biribi (dir. Daniel Moosmann) - Sick Soldier
- 1972: Hellé (dir. Roger Vadim)
- 1981: Le Guépiot (dir. Joska Pilissy) - Le docteur
- 1991: Robinson et compagnie (dir. Jacques Colombat) - (voice) (final film role)

Television

- 1964: Les beaux yeux d'Agatha (TV serial) - Frédéric
- 1964: Le théâtre de la jeunesse (TV Movie)
- 1965: Frédéric le gardian - Fanet
- 1967: Par quatre chemins (TV Movie)
- 1974: La passagère - Patrick Larrivière
- 1975: Esprits de famille (TV Movie) - Victor Bichois

Voice

- 1954: Le Petit Prince
- 1959-62: Les aventures de Tintin
- 1972-80 (approx.): The Streets of San Francisco
- 1978: Le seigneur des anneaux (Lord of the Rings)
- 1991: Robinson et compagnie
