= Eddy Merckx in the Vicinity of a Cup of Coffee =

- Eddy Merckx i nærheden af en kop kaffe
- Directed by: Jørgen Leth
- Starring: Jørgen Leth; Eddy Merckx; Walter Godefroot
- Country of origin: Denmark
- Original language: Danish

Production
- Producers: Stig Crab Barfoed; Charlotte Strandgaard
- Running time: 29 minutes

Original release
- Release: 1973

Eddy Merckx in the Vicinity of a Cup of Coffee (original title: Eddy Merckx i nærheden af en kop kaffe) is a 1973 Danish experimental short film by Jørgen Leth. It was produced by Stig Crab Barfoed and Charlotte Strandgaard and is 29 minutes long.

== Concept ==
The film features Leth reading pieces of poetry in a TV studio, followed by footage from the 1970 Tour de France contest depicting cyclists Eddy Merckx and Walter Godefroot. The music is by Antonio Carlos Jobim.
