= Creative Europe Media =

Incentive to support European film and audiovisual industries

MEDIA sub-programme of Creative Europe
- Formerly: MEDIA Programme of the European Union (1990–2013)
- Type: Incentive
- Traded as: Creative Europe Media (2013–present)
- Industry: Film
- Founded: 1990
- Headquarters: City of Brussels, Belgium
- Parent: European Union (1990–2013); Creative Europe (2013–present)

Creative Europe Media (MEDIA, French: Mesures pour Encourager le Développement de L'Industrie Audiovisuelle, 'Measures to Support the Development of the Audiovisual Industries') is a sub-programme of Creative Europe that provides support to the European film and audiovisual industries. From its establishment in 1990, MEDIA as a programme of the European Union until 2013.

== Administration ==
The MEDIA programme used to be jointly run by the European Commission Directorate-General for Education and Culture (DG EAC) and the Education, Audiovisual and Culture Executive Agency (EACEA Unit P8), which was in charge of the operational management of the MEDIA programme. Since 2014, it has been run by the European Commission Directorate-General for Communications Networks, Content and Technology (CONNECT).

== See also ==
- Culture and the European Union
  - Education in the European Union
  - Culture 2000
  - Directorate-General for Information Society and Media
- List of movie-related topics
- Europa Cinemas
- European Cross Media Academy
- European Film Promotion
