= Poul Nesgaard =

Poul Nesgaard (born 19 June 1952) is a Danish journalist, television producer and art administrator, currently director of the National Film School of Denmark.

== Biography ==
Nesgaard started working for national Danish broadcaster DR and over the following 20 years he was responsible for a long line of unorthodox television programmes for children and young people, both as a producer and a host.

In 1992 he was appointed director of the National Film School of Denmark, replacing Henning Camre who went to England to lead the National Film and Television School in Beaconsfield, Buckinghamshire.

Nesgaard has also been a board member of the Danish Film Institute and Danish national television station TV2.

Academic offices
Preceded by Henning Camre	Rector of National Film School of Denmark; 2003-Present	Succeeded by Present incumbent
