= 66 Scenes from America =

1982 documentary film

- Danish: 66 scener fra Amerika
- Directed by: Jørgen Leth
- Produced by: Ole John
- Cinematography: Dan Holmberg
- Edited by: Kristian Levring
- Production company: Statens Filmcentral
- Release date: 26 March 1982 (Denmark)
- Running time: 42 minutes
- Country: Denmark

66 Scenes from America (Danish: 66 scener fra Amerika) is a 1982 Danish documentary film directed by Jørgen Leth. It presents a variety of short scenes with no connecting narrative. People are shown engaged in ordinary activities with minimal direction. Leth described it as containing "large and small things, events, people, thoughts and feelings".

== Synopsis ==
66 Scenes from America presents a variety of short scenes with no connecting narrative. People are shown engaged in ordinary activities with minimal direction. Leth described it as containing "large and small things, events, people, thoughts and feelings". Each scene typically contains a single shot and has no camera movement. At the end of each scene a narrator lists the location, such as "Lubbock, Texas", and occasionally names an object in the scene, such as in "The American Flag, Manhattan Beach, California". The mention of the object typically changes the viewer's perception of the scene; for example the American flag scene initially appeared to be focussed on a car in front of a house, but when the American flag is mentioned the viewer focusses on a waving flag in the background. The narrator speaks in Danish, but contains so many place names and cognates that Alfred Guzzetti has said that it initially gave him "the illusion that the language is [English]". The film has been described by The Telegraph as "paying homage to Warhol’s Screen Test films, in which a single subject ... is filmed from the neck up, in straight profile, saying little to nothing."

== Andy Warhol eats a hamburger ==
The film's best-known scene shows the artist Andy Warhol eating a Whopper hamburger from the fast food restaurant chain Burger King. He eats the burger at a desk, in near silence. The scene is 4 1/2 minutes long, the longest scene in the film, in part because Warhol did not realize he was expected to say his name immediately after he finished eating, and Leth did not edit out the awkward pause that resulted. In the scene Warhol shakes a bottle of Heinz Tomato Ketchup to consume with the burger, and quietly says at one point that "it doesn't come out". After eating the burger, Warhol packs the remaining food and the packaging away, and after an awkward pause, states "My name is Andy Warhol, and I just finished eating a hamburger."

When making the film, Leth requested that his assistant get hamburgers without branding in their packaging, because he was concerned that Warhol would refuse to eat branded hamburgers because of his commercial value. When Warhol saw the three burgers that had been ordered, two being unbranded and one having Burger King branding, Warhol asked where the McDonald's hamburger was because he believed that it had the better design. Warhol chose to eat the Burger King burger and refused to eat the ones with unbranded wrappers.

In 2014 The Andy Warhol Museum in Pittsburgh began displaying the scene on their fourth floor, and was still displaying it in 2019. The clip has been compared to Warhol's quote "What's great about this country is that America started the tradition where the richest consumers buy essentially the same things as the poorest."

=== 2019 Burger King advertisement ===
In 2019, over three decades after Warhol had died, Burger King aired an excerpt from the scene as a commercial during Super Bowl LIII. The advertisement is 45 seconds long and ends with the hashtag #EatLikeAndy and the Burger King logo. The Andy Warhol Foundation and representatives of Leth approved the use of the footage in the advertisement. A week before the advert was released, Burger King gave customers who ordered their products via DoorDash a mystery box which contained, among other things, a white wig that had a similar appearance to the wigs of Warhol.

Burger King's global chief marketing officer, Fernando Machado, has stated that he wished that the entire 4 minutes and 20-second scene would make it into the Super Bowl advertisement, but said that this would have been too expensive. However, the company placed the full clip on their website.

Steve Johnson of the Chicago Tribune ranked it as the fifth best 2019 Super Bowl commercial, and The Washington Post chose it as one of the top 10 Super Bowl commercials of the year. However, viewers surveyed by the consumer insights company Suzy ranked it as one of the year's five worst Super Bowl ads. Brandwatch counted over 11,000 mentions of the commercial on social media, with 55.5% being positive and 44.5% being negative.

Johnson theorised that Heinz Tomato Ketchup would have appreciated the ad as their tomato sauce was prominently featured.
