= The Double Man =

The Double Man may refer to:

- The Double Man (book), a 1941 book of poems by W. H. Auden
- The Double Man (1967 film), a British spy film
- The Double Man (1976 film), a Danish crime film
