= Irène Vernal =

Belgian actress

Irène Vernal (14 July 1912 – September 2008) was a Belgian actress.

She was born in Antwerp, Belgium. She played at the Rideau de Bruxelles and at the National Theater of Belgium. She was awarded as the Eve of the Theatre (Ève du Théâtre) for her role in the play The Rose Tattoo at Rideau de Bruxelles.

== Theater ==
- 1935: Herman Closson La farce des deux nues, directed by Claude Etienne and Werner Degan, Caves of Han-sur-Lesse
- 1938: Jean Racine Bérénice at the Royal Park Theatre
- 1950: William Shakespeare Troilus and Cressida, directed by André Berger, Centre for Fine Arts, Brussels
- 1952: Tennessee Williams The Rose Tattoo, directed by Maurice Vaneau, Rideau de Bruxelles
- 1989: George Bernard Shaw Pygmalion directed by Jean-Pierre Rey, Théâtre royal des Galeries

== Filmographie ==
- 1967 : Le Mariage de mademoiselle Beulemans
- 1970 : Peace in the Fields
