= Filmbyen =

Film studio in Denmark

Filmbyen (English: Film City) is a film studio complex located in Hvidovre just outside Copenhagen, Denmark. It is a former military base. It houses film-related companies. Films and TV-series have been shot there. It was founded by Lars von Trier and Peter Aalbæk Jensen's company Zentropa in 1997 and was still owned and run by Zentropa as of 2013.

The story of Filmbyen, its people and companies are told in Thomas Vilhelm's book Filmbyen (Ekstra Bladets Forlag, 2007), and in the documentary Filmbyen, la nouvelle Mecque du cinéma? (Filmbyen, the new Mecca of cinema?) directed by Pablo Tréhin-Marçot (France, 2007).

== See also ==
- Think Tank on European Film and Film Policy
