= Jørgen Leth =

Danish poet and film director (1937–2025)

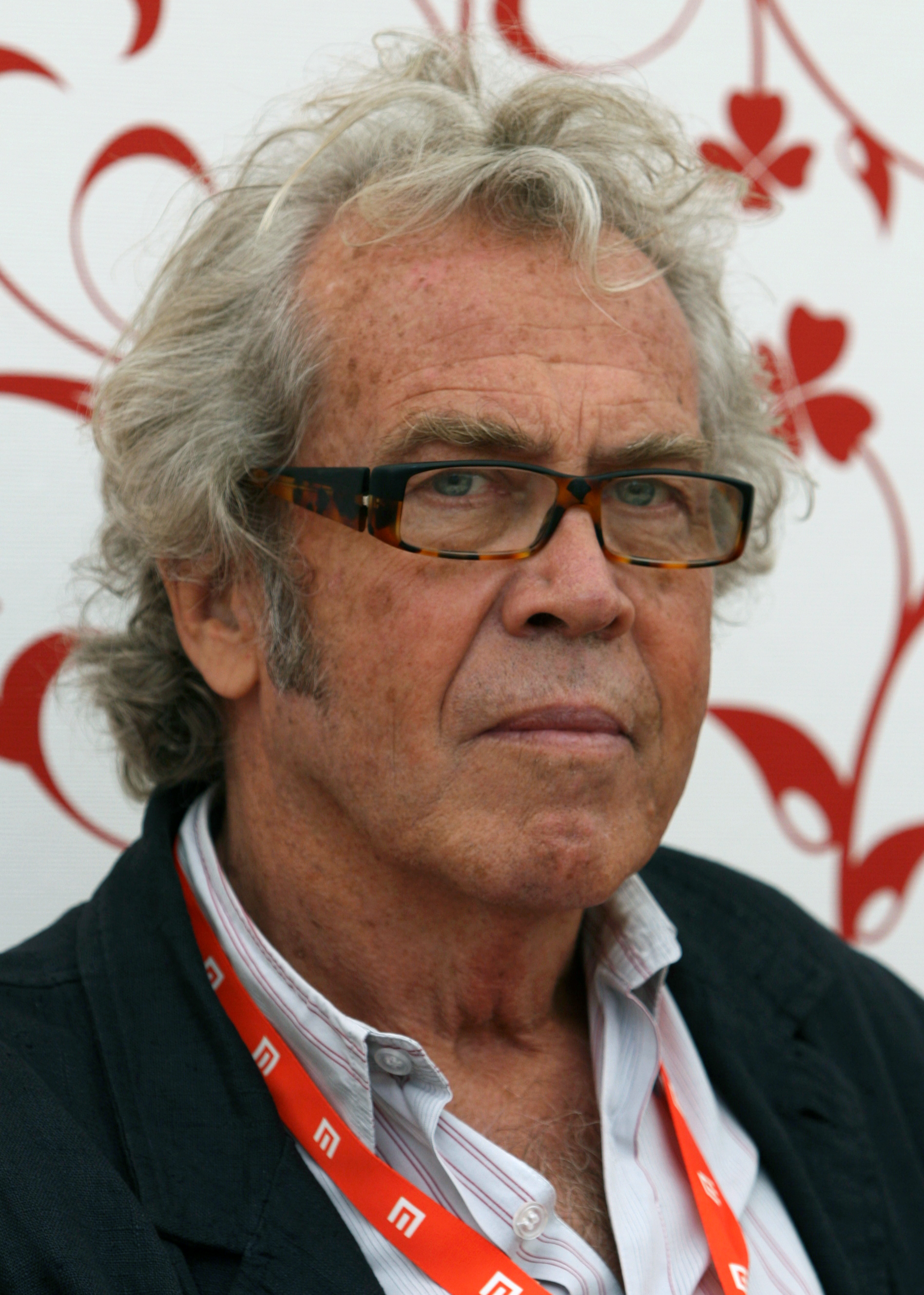
- Leth in 2008
- Born: 14 June 1937; Aarhus, Denmark
- Died: 29 September 2025 (aged 88)
- Occupations: Director; author
- Years active: 1962–2025
- Children: 4

Jørgen Leth (Danish: [ˈjɶːɐ̯n̩ ˈlet]; 14 June 1937 – 29 September 2025) was a Danish poet and film director who was considered a leading figure in experimental documentary filmmaking. Most notable is his documentary A Sunday in Hell (1977) and his surrealistic short film The Perfect Human (1968). He was also a sports commentator for Danish television and was represented by the film production company Sunset Productions.

== Early life ==
Born on 14 June 1937 in Aarhus, Denmark, Leth studied literature and anthropology in Aarhus and Copenhagen and was a cultural critic (jazz, theatre, film) for leading Danish newspapers from 1959 to 1968. His interest in Polish anthropologist Bronisław Malinowski had a profound influence on his work. He traveled in Africa (1961), South America and India (1966), and Southeast Asia (1970–71). His first book was published in 1962. He wrote 10 volumes of poetry and eight non-fiction books.

== Film career ==
Leth made his first film in 1963 and eventually made 40 more, many distributed worldwide. His most acclaimed is a 1968 short, The Perfect Human, which also featured in the 2003 film The Five Obstructions made by Leth and Lars von Trier. Leth's sports documentaries bring an epic, almost mythic, dimension to the field, as seen in Stars and Watercarriers (Stjernerne og Vandbærerne) (1973) and A Sunday in Hell (En forårsdag i helvede) (1977).

He was a creative consultant for the Danish Film Institute (1971–73, 1975–77) as well as chairman of the institute's board (1977–82). He was also a professor at the Danish National Film School in Copenhagen, at the State Studiocenter in Oslo and lectured at UCLA, Berkeley, Harvard, and other American universities.

Leth covered the Tour de France for Denmark's TV 2 from 1988 until 2005 as the expert commentator in partnership with journalist Jørn Mader, and again from 2009 in partnership with Dennis Ritter and Rolf Sørensen. In 1999, he was appointed Danish honorary consul in Haiti.

== Controversy ==
Leth attracted controversy in Denmark after publication of his autobiography Det uperfekte menneske (The Imperfect Human). It included a graphic account of sexual relations with the 17-year-old daughter of his cook in Haiti. This created a media storm in Denmark, partly because of his plan to make a film called Det Erotiske Menneske ("The Erotic Human"), funded by the Danish Film Institute, in collaboration with DR (Danmarks Radio) and Nordisk Film and TV Commission. The controversy upset several groups in Denmark. In October 2005, due to the controversy, he was dismissed as commentator with TV2. Leth then considered to quit finishing his film Erotic Man, but close friend and fellow filmmaker Lars von Trier met with Leth and promised to let himself credit as executive producer on the film, in order to support Leth's artistic work. Erotic Man premiered at the Toronto International Film Festival in September 2010. The film received lacklustre reviews which deemed it "dirty-old-man cinema" and colonialist exploitation.

== Personal life and death ==
Leth married three times and had four children: Asger (film director), Karoline, Kristian and Tomas.

Leth moved to Haiti in the late 1980s and referred to it as his second home. He lived in Jacmel from 1991 until 2010, when the Haiti earthquake destroyed his rented home and most of his possessions. In 2013, Leth was still living in Haiti for about six months of the year, but with friends on the northern coast.

Leth died on 29 September 2025, at the age of 88.

== Honours ==
Retrospectives of Leth's work have been held at the National Film Theatre in London (1989), in Rouen, France (1990), at the American Film Institute in Washington D.C. (1992), in Mumbai (1996), New York (2002), São Paulo (2003), Toronto (2004), Florence (2005), Rome (2006), São Paulo (2008), Warsaw (2008) and Tehran (2008), and at the Athens International Film Festival in Athens (2009).

He was the recipient of numerous awards, including:

- 1971 Oberhausen Hauptpreis
- 1972 Thomas Mann Award
- 1983 Danish Academy Special Prize
- 1992 Paul Hammerich Award
- 1995 Drachmann Award for literary oeuvre
- 1996 Danish Film Academy Robert Award
- 1997 Prix de France for cultural reporting from France
- 1999 Danish State Art Foundation Special Award
- 2000 Danish Film Academy Robert Award
- 2004 Grand Prix for Best Feature at Odense International Film Festival
- 2009 Honorary Bodil award for lifetime achievement
- 2022 Member of the Ordre des Arts et Lettres of France
- Lifelong grant from the Danish state for achievements in filmmaking

== Selected bibliography ==
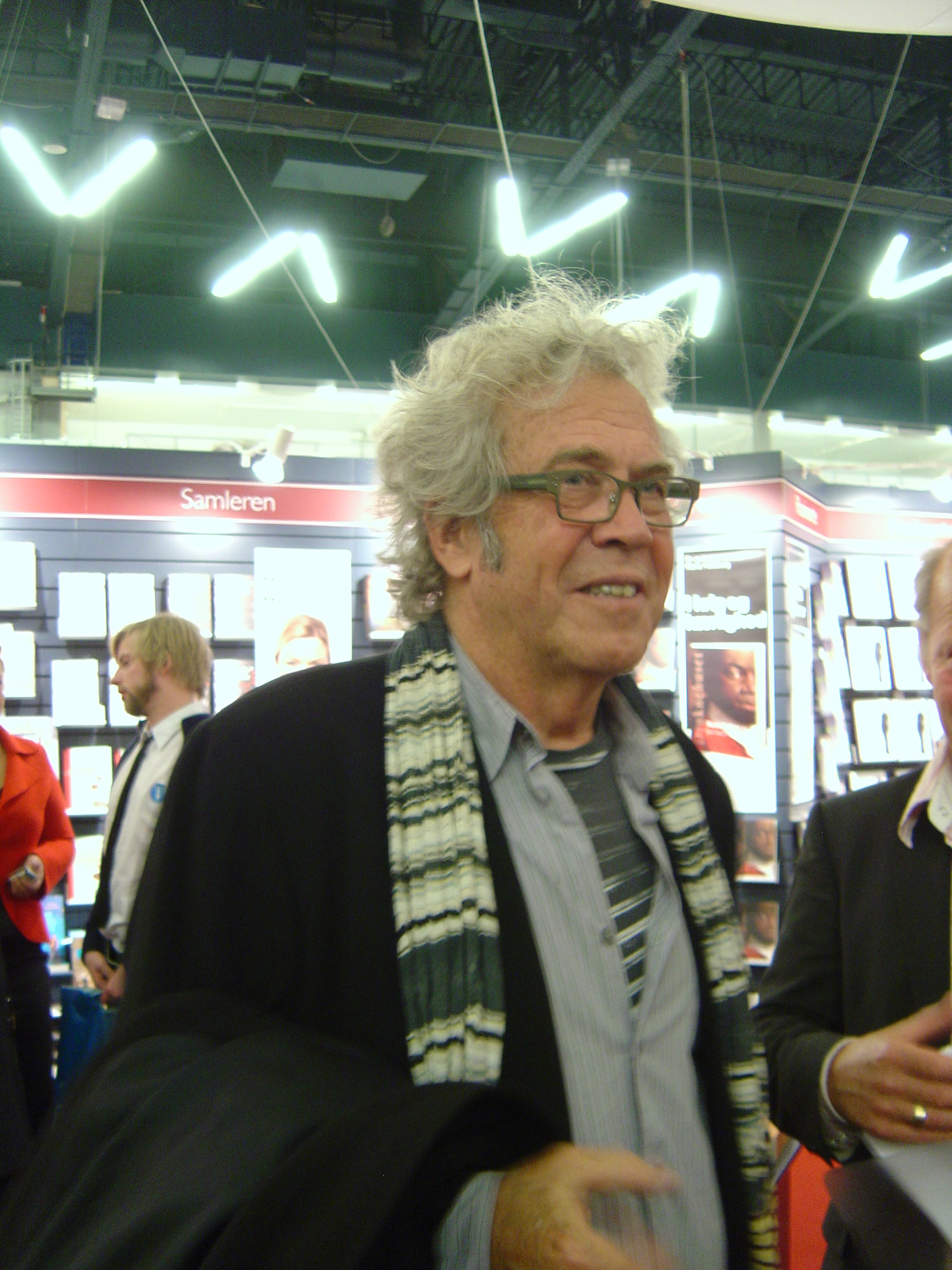
Leth at the annual book fair, BogForum 2008, at Forum Copenhagen

Two biographies of Leth have been published in Denmark.

- Gult lys (Yellow Light) (1962) – poems
- Kanal (Channel) (1964) – poems
- Lykken i Ingenmandsland (Happiness in No-man's Land) (1967) – poems
- Sportsdigte (Sports Poems) (1967) – poems
- Glatte hårdtpumpede puder (Smooth, Inflated Cushions) (1969) – poems
- Eventyret om den sædvanlige udsigt (The Adventure of the Usual View) (1971) – radio play
- Eddy Merckx i nærheden af en kop kaffe (Eddy Merckx in the Vicinity of a Cup of Coffee) (1973)
- Det går forbi mig (It Passes Me) (1975) – poems
- Det skete ved Ballerup (It happened near Ballerup) (1975) – short story
- Det er ligesom noget i en drøm. Udvalgte historier om cykelsport 1970–75 (It's like Something in a Dream: Selected Stories about bicycle sport 1970–75) (1976)
- Filmmaskinen. Udvalgte historier om film 1965–78 (The Film Machine. Selected Stories about Films 1965–78) (1979)
- Jeg leger at jeg kan alting. En børnebog (I play that I can do everything. A Children's Book) (1991)
- Hundene gør. Kup i Haiti 1991–94 (The Dogs Bark. Coup in Haiti 1991–94) (1994) – documentary
- Den gule trøje i de høje bjerge (The Yellow Jersey in the High Mountains) 1995 – collection of writings about cycling
- Billeder fra Haiti. Jørgen Leth's collection (Pictures from Haiti – Jørgen Leth's Collection) – catalogue of art
- Billedet forestiller (The Picture Shows) (2000) – poems
- Historier fra Haiti (Stories from Haiti) (2000)
- Samlede digte (Collected Poems) (2002)
- Det uperfekte menneske. Scener fra mit liv (The Imperfect Man. Scenes from My Life) (2005) – memoires
- Det gør ikke noget (It Doesn't Matter) (2006) – poems
- Guldet på havets bund. Det uperfekte menneske/2 (The Gold at the Bottom of the Sea. The Imperfect Human/2) (2007)
- One Day Duke Jordan Disappeared in Harlem (2008) – articles about jazz 1954–66
- The Gifts of Chance (2009) – essays about filmmaking
- Haiti (2010) – documentary
- Trivial Everyday Things: Selected Poems of Jørgen Leth (BookThug, 2011) – translations into English by Martin Aitken

== Filmography ==
- Stopforbud, 1963
- Look Forward to a Bright Future, 1965
- The Perfect Human, 1968
- Near Heaven, Near Earth, 1968
- Ophelia's Flowers, 1969
- Motion Picture, 1970
- The Search, 1970
- The Deergarden, the Romantic Forest, 1970
- Chinese Table-tennis, 1970
- Life in Denmark, 1971
- Stars and Watercarriers, 1973
- Klaus Rifbjerg, 1974
- Good and Evil, 1974
- A Sunday in Hell, 1977
- Peter Martins – A Dancer, 1978
- Kalule, 1979
- Dancing Bournonville, 1979
- 66 Scenes from America, 1982
- Step on Silence, 1981
- Pelota, 1983
- Haiti Express, 1983
- Moments of Play, 1986
- Notebook from China, 1986
- Notes on Love, 1989
- Danish Literature, 1989
- Traberg, 1992
- Michael Laudrup – A Football Player, 1993
- Haiti, Untitled, 1996
- I'm Alive – Soren Ulrik Thomsen, Poet, 1999
- Dreamers, 2002
- New Scenes from America, 2002
- The Five Obstructions (with Lars von Trier), 2003
- Aarhus (2005)
- Erotic Man (2010)
- I Am Talking To You (2013)
- Pelota II (with Olatz Gonzalez Abrisketa), 2015

== Discography ==
- Han er nu malet blå, 2004.
- Vi sidder bare her – Vi sidder bare her..., 2008
- Vi sidder bare her – Ikke Euforisk, 2010
- Ingen Regning Til Mig, 2014
