= Peter Belli =

Danish singer and actor (1943–2023)

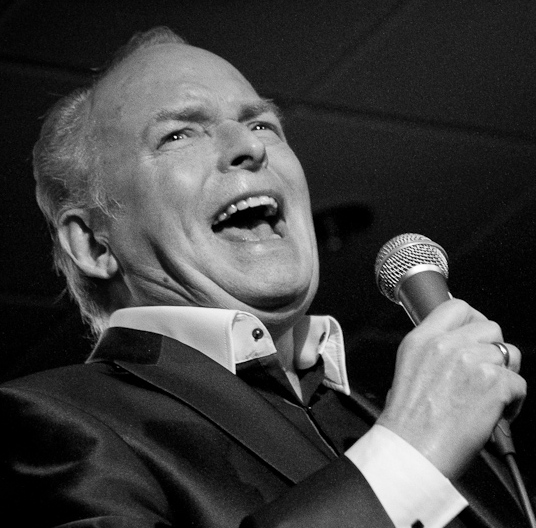
- Belli performing in 2011
- Born: Georg Peter Brandt; 19 June 1943; Kiel, Gau Schleswig-Holstein, Germany
- Died: 8 June 2023 (aged 79)
- Occupations: Singer; actor; voice actor
- Years active: 1959–2023
- Spouse: June Belli
- Musical career
- Genres: Rock
- Instrument: Vocals

Peter Belli (born Georg Peter Brandt; 19 June 1943 – 8 June 2023) was a German-born Danish singer and actor.

== Career ==
Belli's debut as a singer was in 1959, for a band called Trefters. In the 1960s, he became Denmark's first rock star, alongside his band, Les Rivals, warming up for such greats as The Rolling Stones and The Beatles.

In the 1970s, Belli transitioned to doing more dansktop, having several hits such as Bliv væk fra vort kvarter and Ingen regning. In the same period, he started acting in a number of Danish movies.

In 1981 he had a hit with "Hvis det er sandt" from his same year album "Er det sådan?". It was a Danish version of Billy Joel's You May Be Right.

In the late 1980s Belli returned to his rock roots, having great success with his Yeah album.

Belli died on 8 June 2023, at the age of 79.

== Discography ==
Belli published 43 records in his career:

- Peter Belli, 1967
- Ob-la-di, ob-la-da, 1968
- Peter Belli, 1971
- Peter Belli & Søn, 1974
- Peter Belli's største succes'er, 1974
- Det bli'r aldrig som det var i..., 1975
- Peter Belli & Ulvene Live, 1976
- Nu er det blevet hårde tider, 1977
- Sådan er mit liv, 1977
- Jeg lever for musik, 1978
- Sådan som du er, 1979
- Peter Belli's 20 års jubilæum, 1980
- Peter Belli's bedste 1965–1970, 1980
- Er det sådan?, 1981
- Kære gamle tog, 1981
- Fræk og følsom, 1981
- Belli's allerbedste, 1981
- Tænk hvad jeg ser, 1982
- Sort på hvidt, 1983
- Jeg er som jeg er, 1984
- Roll over Beatles (med Les Rivals), 1987
- Ta' det med et smil, 1987
- Yeah, 1991
- Ribbet og flået, 1992
- Ulven Peter de 34 største hits, 1993
- Rock and Roll Live, 1994
- Talisman, 1997
- Helt igennem respektabel – Peter Belli 1959 – 1999, 1999
- The Collection, 2000
- Ny dag på vej, 2001 (DNK#15)
- Peter Belli synger julens sange, 2001
- The Beat years 1964 – 1968, 2002
- Ulven Peter, 2002
- Got Masters if you want it, 2003
- Hit House Reunion, 2003
- Konger for en aften, 2003
- Når timerne bli'r små, 2004 (DNK#6)
- Sange fra Blomstersengen, 2005 (DNK#14)
- Peter Belli – Den Store Peter Belli Boks – De Første 25 År 1964–1989, 2006 (DNK#39)
- Rock n Soul Music: The Memphis Album, 2007 (DNK#21)
- Rejsende I Rock'n´roll, 2009
- Underværker, 2011 (DNK#19)
- Evig Og Altid, 2013 (DNK#10)
- Som Boblerne I Bækken, 2016 (DNK#15)
- Sidste Nat Med Bandet, 2018 (DNK#10)

== Filmography ==
In the span of his career, Belli acted and voice-acted in Danish movies:

- Thomas er fredløs, 1967
- Den dobbelte mand, 1976
- Pelle Haleløs, 1981 (voice)
- Høfeber, 1991
- The Lion King, 1994 (Danish dub; voice of Rafiki)
- The Lion King 2, 1998 (Danish dub; voice of Rafiki)
- Et rigtigt menneske, 2001
- Flyvende farmor, 2001
- Tid til forandring, 2004
- Bølle Bob og Smukke Sally, 2005
- Koko-di Koko-da, 2019

== Bibliography ==
In 2011, Peter Belli published a self-biography titled Et enestående liv.
