= Vadum =

- Town
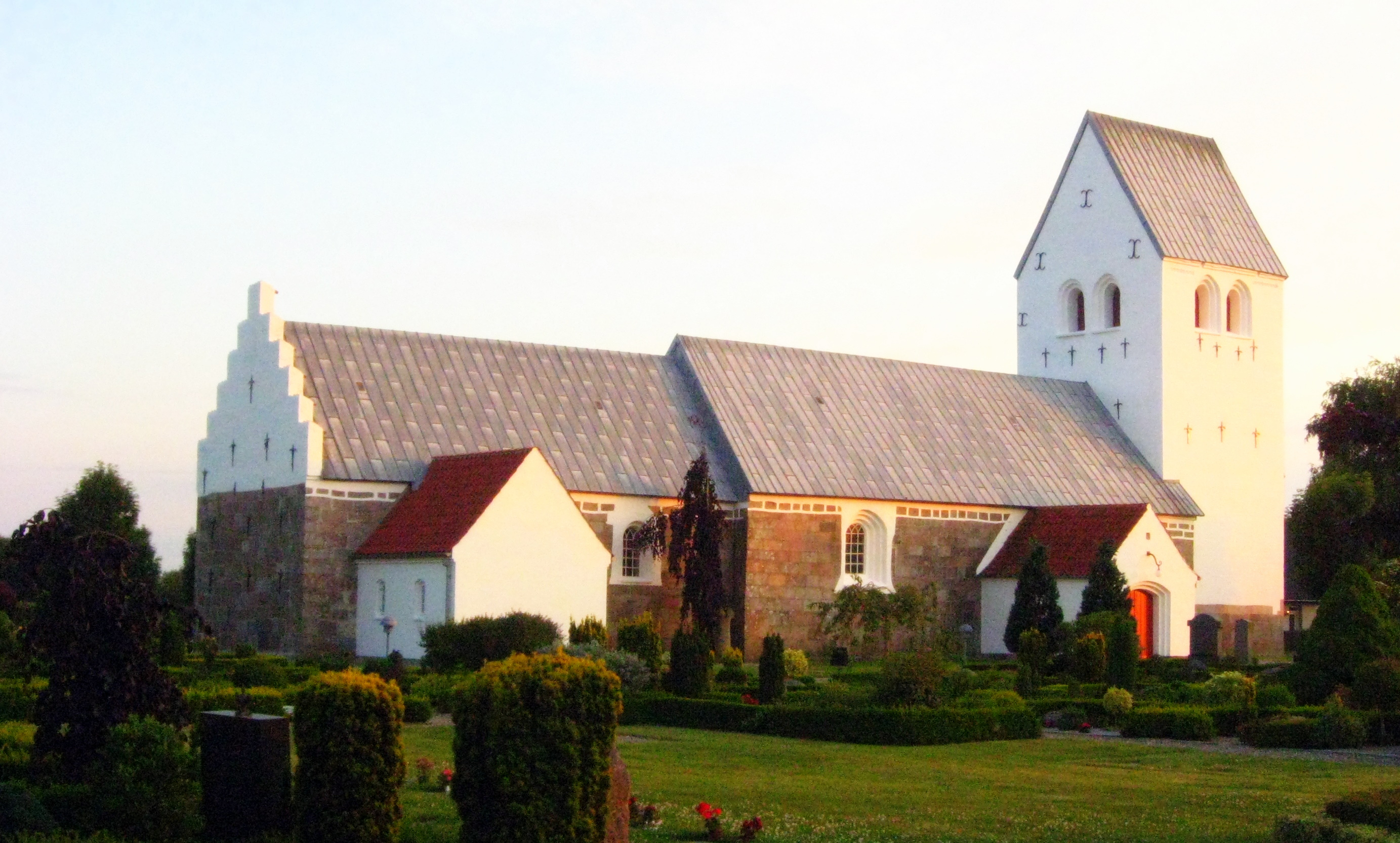
- Vadum Church

- Location in Denmark Vadum (North Jutland Region)
- Coordinates: 57°7′5″N 9°51′28″E
- Country: Denmark
- Region: North Jutland Region
- Municipality: Aalborg Municipality

Area
  - Urban: 1.44 km^{2} (0.56 sq mi)

Population (2026)
  - Urban: 2,552
  - Urban density: 1,770/km^{2} (4,590/sq mi)
  - Gender: 1,242 males and 1,310 females
- Time zone: UTC+1 (CET)
  - Summer (DST): UTC+2 (CEST)
- Postal code: DK-9430 Vadum

Vadum is a village and satellite community just outside Aalborg, Denmark. Located some 10 km (6.2 mi) north of Aalborg's city centre, it belongs to the Municipality of Aalborg in the North Jutland Region. Vadum has a population of 2,552 (1 January 2026).

== Notable people ==
- Niels Busk (born 1942 in Vadum) a Danish politician and Member of the European Parliament
- Henrik Bo Nielsen (born 1961 in Vadum) a Danish arts administrator, CEO of Roskilde Museum
