= The Little Hut =

1957 film by Mark Robson

- Theatrical release poster
- Directed by: Mark Robson
- Screenplay by: F. Hugh Herbert
- Based on: La Petite Hutte; 1947 play by André Roussin The Little Hut; 1950 play by Nancy Mitford
- Produced by: F. Hugh Herbert; Mark Robson
- Starring: Ava Gardner; Stewart Granger; David Niven
- Cinematography: Freddie Young
- Edited by: Ernest Walter
- Music by: Robert Farnon
- Distributed by: Metro-Goldwyn-Mayer
- Release date: May 3, 1957
- Running time: 90 minutes
- Countries: United Kingdom; United States
- Language: English
- Budget: $1.7 million
- Box office: $3.6 million

The Little Hut is a 1957 romantic comedy film directed by Mark Robson from a screenplay by F. Hugh Herbert, based on the 1950 play by Nancy Mitford, itself adapted from the 1947 play La petite hutte by André Roussin. The film stars Ava Gardner, Stewart Granger, and David Niven.

== Plot ==
High-flying tycoon Sir Philip Ashlow (Granger), his neglected wife, Lady Susan Ashlow (Gardner) and his best friend, pettifogger civil servant Henry Brittingham-Brett (Niven), are shipwrecked on a desert island.

Susan feels neglected and has been trying to make Philip jealous by demonstrating a romantic interest in Henry, who begins taking her seriously. Now that they are alone on the island, Philip constructs a large hut for his wife and himself and a little hut for Henry, but before long Henry is suggesting they share not only food and water but Susan as well.

Opposed to this, Susan nevertheless is offended by Philip's indifferent reaction to Henry's indecent proposal. The quarrel escalates until Philip declares that, as captain of their ship, he feels entitled not only to perform marriages but to grant divorces. He awaits Susan's decision on whether the men should change huts or share and share alike.

This potential ménage à trois where the two men are competing for the lady's attention is interrupted by a fourth visitor. The stranger is dressed in native garb and takes Susan captive, but is soon revealed to be Mario, the chef from their yacht, indulging a whim. The laughter from inside the hut between Susan and Mario is misinterpreted by Henry and her husband as being romantic in nature, arousing jealousy from both men.

After their rescue and return to society, Henry comes to visit Susan to propose they be together. But when he finds her and Philip in domestic repose, and Susan knitting baby booties, he knows the battle for her love is lost.

== Cast ==
- Ava Gardner as Lady Susan Ashlow
- Stewart Granger as Sir Philip Ashlow
- David Niven as Henry Brittingham-Brett
- Walter Chiari as Mario
- Finlay Currie as The Reverend Bertram Brittingham-Brett
- Jean Cadell as Mrs. Hermione Brittingham-Brett
- Jack Lambert as Captain MacWalt
- Henry Oscar as Mr. Trollope
- Viola Lyel as Miss Edwards
- Jaron Yaltan as Indian Gentleman
- Richard Wattis as Official

== Original play ==
The script of The Little Hut was written by the French writer André Roussin, based on his own play La petite hutte (1947). Both play and script are based on another play in Catalan, written by the novelist and playwright Carles Soldevila (1892–1967): Civilitzats tanmateix (Nevertheless civilized) (1921). This play was known in France through a translation by Adolphe de Faigairolle and Francesc Presas, published in 1927 in the magazine Candide.

The play ran for over 1,500 performances in Paris, was translated into English by Nancy Mitford and ran for three years in the West End, starting in 1950 with Robert Morley and David Tomlinson (with Roger Moore as their understudy) at the Lyric Theatre before being made into the film.

The play flopped on Broadway in 1953 despite being directed by Peter Brook. Robert Morley was unable to reprise his performance in New York due to a tax situation.

In 2010, the play was revived starring Aden Gillett and Janie Dee.

== Production ==
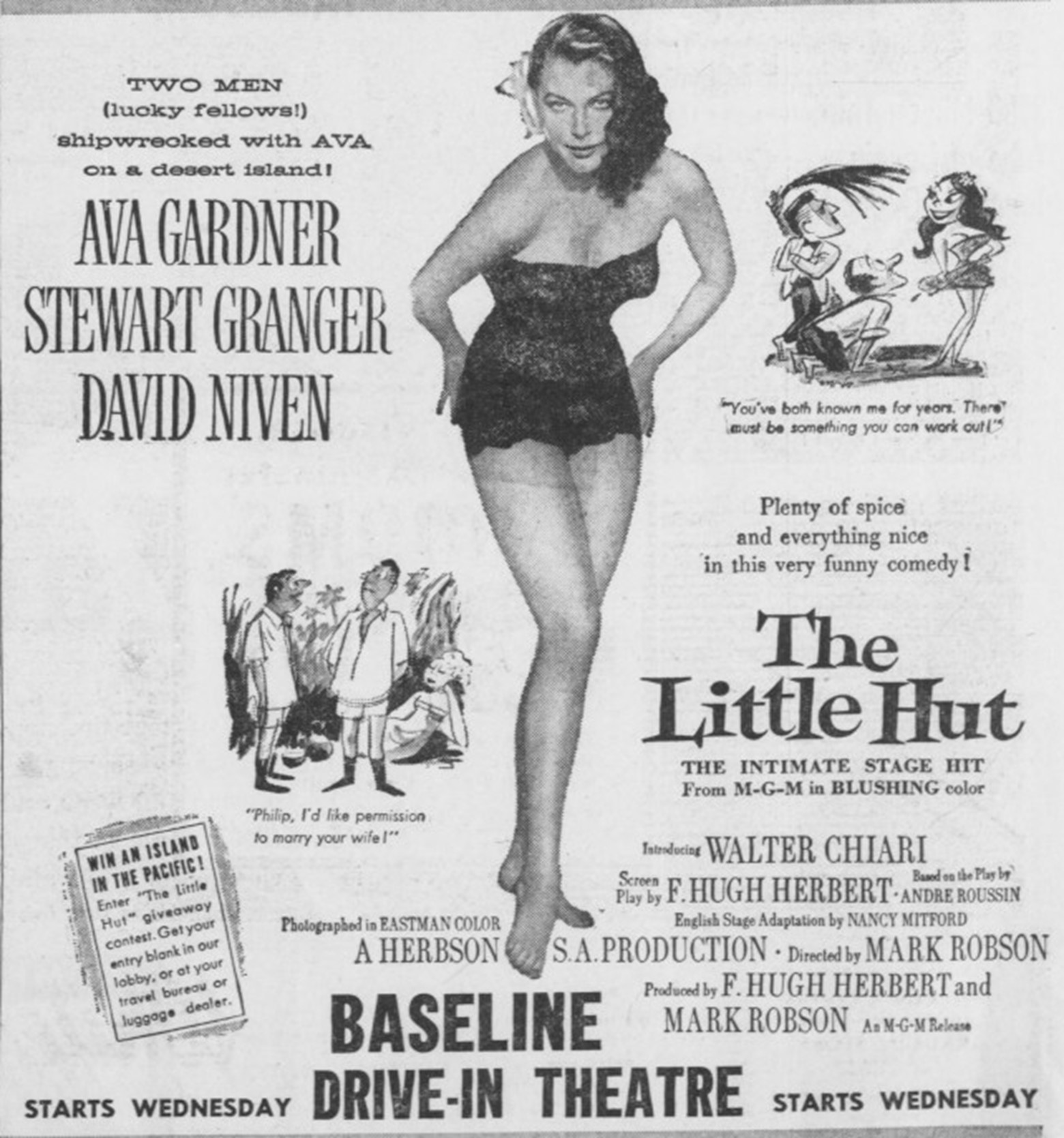
Drive-in advertisement from 1957

There was reluctance to obtain the screen rights due to concern about censorship. In February 1955, F. Hugh Herbert and Mark Robson announced they had formed a company to purchase the film rights to the play and make a movie from it.

Herbert had written The Moon Is Blue, which had famously been released without a seal of approval from the Production Code. However Herbert said "after that episode I was determined not to make another picture without a seal."

The screenplay made a number of changes from the play. In the play, the affair was real, but in the film. the wife only pretended to get her husband interested in her. Robson said Herbert had proved with The Moon Is Blue that the censors did not mind if characters "talked about sex as much as you want – as long as nothing happens." The boyfriend became an old admirer of the woman, and the woman and her husband were given a divorce on board the ship. Also a dog was added to interrupt any potential sex moments.

Herbert completed the script by January 1956 and David Niven, Noël Coward, and Clifton Webb were being discussed for the male leads. Audrey Hepburn and Mel Ferrer were also discussed. By April, the lead roles had been cast: Niven, Ava Gardner and Stewart Granger. They made the film independently but did a deal with MGM to finance which involved MGM loaning their contract players Stewart Granger and Ava Gardner.

Herbert said it "doesn't matter much where we make the film since 75% of it takes place on a desert island."

It was planned to shoot the whole film in England, but a shortage of suitable studio space made this impossible. The film was shot in England and Italy over August to September 1956, with six weeks filming at the Cinecittà Studios in Rome and some background filming in Italy. Post production was done in England.

== Reception ==
According to MGM records, the film earned $2,085,000 in North America and $1,515,000 elsewhere, making a profit of $340,000.

It did not perform well at the French box office with admissions of only 591,767.

Mark Robson signed Walter Chiari to a five-picture contract on the basis of his performance calling him a "new Maurice Chevalier".
