= Peace in the Fields =

1970 Belgian film by Jacques Boigelot

- Directed by: Jacques Boigelot
- Written by: Marie Gevers; Jacques Boigelot
- Produced by: Jacques de Pauw
- Starring: Christian Barbier
- Cinematography: Philippe Collette
- Release date: 1970
- Running time: 91 minutes
- Country: Belgium
- Language: French

Peace in the Fields (French: Paix sur les champs) is a 1970 French-language Belgian film directed by Jacques Boigelot and based on the eponymous novel by Marie Gevers. It was nominated for the Academy Award for Best Foreign Language Film.

== Plot ==
As Aloysius lies on his deathbed, he summons Stanne, the wealthiest farmer in the region, and Johanna, a stern-faced widow, to his side. Two decades earlier, when Johanna's daughter died tragically, didn't the legal inquiry conclude that the girl no longer wished to be with him? Despite Aloysius's heartfelt pleas, Stanne and Johanna stubbornly refuse to reconcile, parting ways bitterly. Louis, Stanne's son, who once loved Julia, a captivating yet somewhat promiscuous redhead, loses interest in her upon meeting the charming Lodia, Johanna's daughter born twenty years after the loss of her elder sister. Louis and Lodia endeavor to gain approval for their love from their parents.

== Cast ==
- Christian Barbier as Stanne Vanasche
- Georges Poujouly as Louis
- Claire Wauthion as Lodia
- Héléna Manson as Johanna
- Arlette Schreiber as Rosa
- Nicole Valberg as Julia
- Lucien Raimbourg as Jardinier
- Vandéric as Aloysius
- Marthe Dugard as Soeur Thérésia
- Josi Jolet as Jules
- Irène Vernal as Fine
- Gilbert Charles as Curé

== See also ==
- List of submissions to the 43rd Academy Awards for Best Foreign Language Film
- List of Belgian submissions for the Academy Award for Best Foreign Language Film
