= André Roussin =

French playwright

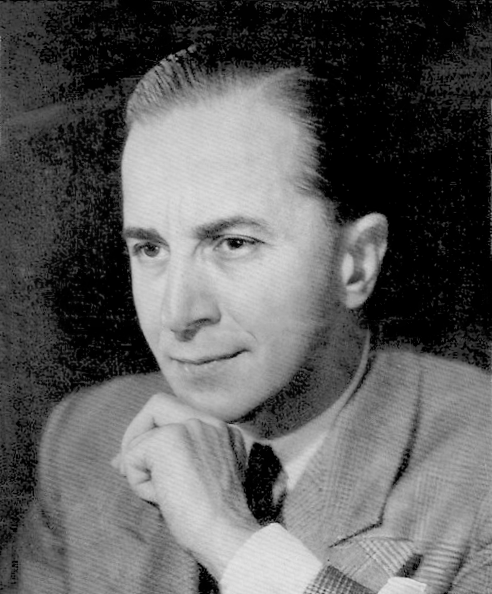
- Born: 22 January 1911; Marseille, France
- Died: 3 November 1987 (aged 76); Paris, France

André Roussin (22 January 1911 – 3 November 1987) was a French playwright. Born in Marseille, he was elected to the Académie française on 12 April 1973.

== Biography ==
=== Early life and education ===
Born on 119 rue Paradis in Marseille, he was raised in Saint-Barnabé in a family belonging to the upper-middle class of Marseille: his father, Joseph-André Honoré Louis Roussin (1877-1932), was an insurer, his mother, Félicité-Louise-Suzanne Gardair (1884-1976), was one of six daughters of a powerful Marseille industrialist who inspired the works Le Tombeau d'Achille and La Sainte Famille.

His father encouraged him to study law after his baccalauréat even though he knew that that did not fit with his son's aspirations; 'My son has a dual ambition; to be the worst in class and to become Napoleon. As to the first ambition I think that he won't have any issue, as to the second, I'm not sure I'll live to see his coronation'. Interested in the arts (he painted and had played violin for six years), André Roussin showed a taste for theatre at an early age, which earned him the nickname 'Pagnolet'. The nickname was given during the performance of Marcel Pagnol's play Topaze in 1928, when he had to retake his baccalauréat.

Without his families knowledge, he dropped his law studies in his first year, to briefly become a journalist for the Petit Marseillais before devoting himself to the theatre.

=== Early career ===
His family realised his talent when he parodied Le Misanthrope by Molière in Les Fureurs d’Alceste, a work he wrote in alexandrines. In 1933, he joined the Compagnie du rideau gris founded by Louis Ducreux. He acted and directed in the troupe until the end of the Second World War. The troupe were living in poverty, and the tours stopped in 1936. He then worked as a paint-seller, journalist and insurer.

=== Dramatist ===
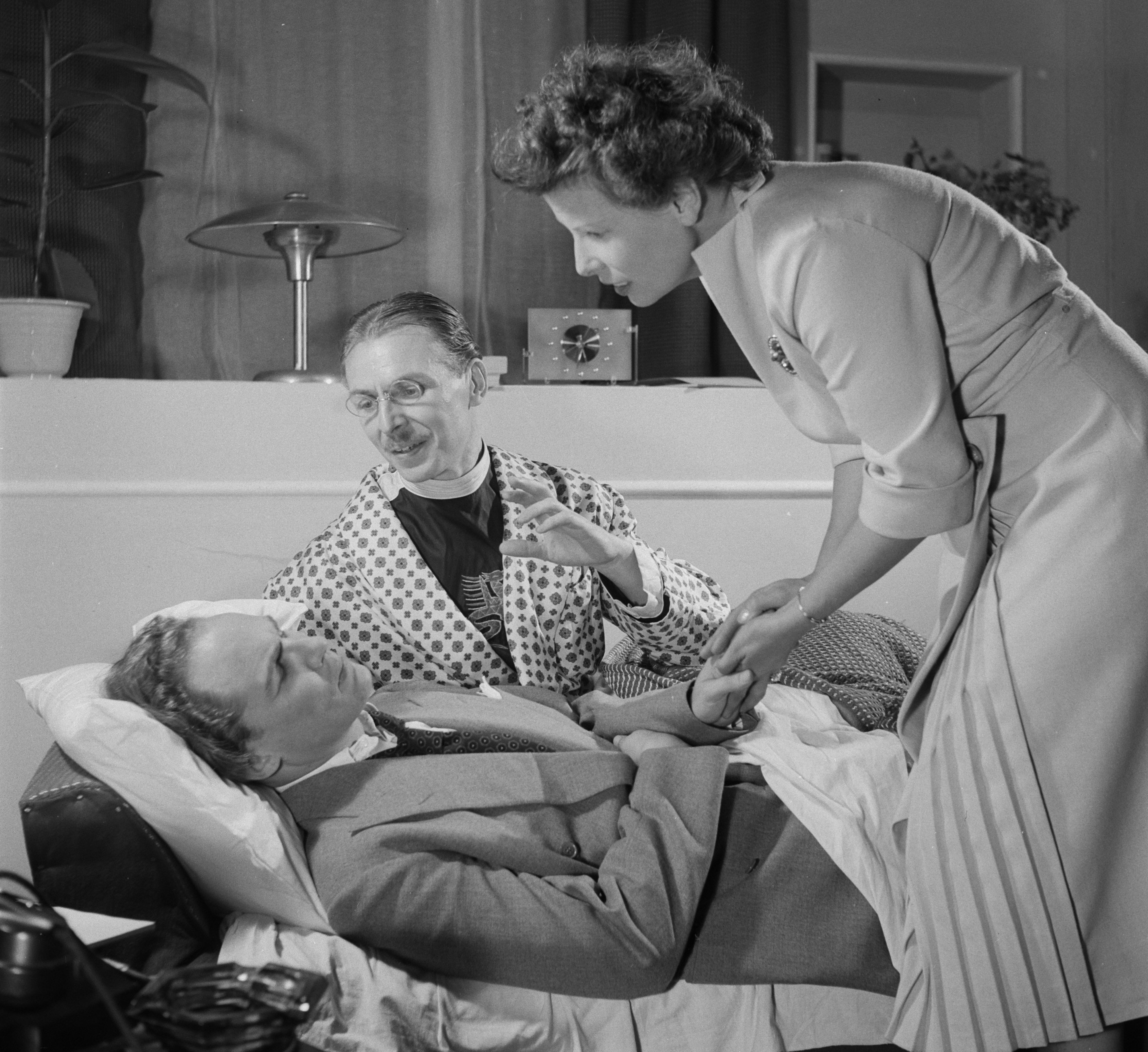
The play Nina (1949), played by Mary Dresselhuys in 1950 in the Netherlands.

During the war, André Roussin wrote and produced thanks to a small inheritance. His first play Am stram gram was a comedy in three parts with the young, up-and-coming actress Micheline Presle as the lead. First put on in the free zone in 1941, where it was very successful, the play was then staged in Paris in 1943 where it was also successful. In 1943, he wrote Une grande fille for Madeleine Robinson with whom he had had a romantic relationship. In 1944, his play Jean-Baptiste le mal-aimé, inspired by the life of Molière, suffered critical and commercial failure.

It was with La Petite Hutte that he saved his reputation. Adapted from a comedy, which was written and published in Catalan in 1921 by Carles Soldevila (1892-1967), Civilitzats tanmateix, the play was first staged in Brussels in October 1947 in a production by the author, who also acted in it alongside Suzanne Flon and Fernand Gravey. In December that year, the production was reprised at the Théâtre des Nouveautés in Paris where it ran for 1,500 shows.

In the following years, Roussin's plays were mostly successful. Such as Bobosse, which was created in 1950, that François Périer acted in more than 1,500 times. Lorsque l'enfant paraît, put on by the Théâtre des Nouveautés in 1951 and replacing La Petite Hutte, had more than 1,600 shows. He also began a fruitful collaboration with Elvire Popesco, through which he wrote Nina (1949), La Mamma (1957), La Voyante (1963) et La Locomotive (1967). While they were popular with the public, his subsequent plays were poorly received by a new generation of critics who were followers of André Malraux's policy (the then minister of culture), which was implemented in the 1960s.

The subjects addressed by André Roussin's comedies went beyond the usual boulevard theatre themes to talk about subjects that were rarely touched, about which the author put forward views that were remarkably progressive for his time. Thus, Les Œufs de l'autruche talks abouthomosexuality, and Lorsque l'enfant paraît touches on abortion, which rarely appeared in the theatre of the 1950s. His desire to keep up with changing cultural mores and opinions led him to revise some of his plays by modifying their texts or plots.

=== Académie française ===
André Roussin was elected to the Académie française on 12 April 1973, in seat 7, replacing Pierre-Henri Simon. He declared before his election: 'If I am elected, I will be immortal; if I am defeated, it won't kill me'. His official inauguration took place on 2 May 1974. Exhausted by critics and his new status which fit poorly with his strong imagination, his theatrical production declined.

=== Personal life ===
André Roussin married Marie Marguerite Henriette Lucienne Deluy (1903-1999) on 4 June 1947 at the town hall of the 16th arrondissement of Paris. The couple had one son, Jean-Marie.

== Bibliography ==
- 1933 Patiences et impatiences
- 1944 Am Stram Gram
- 1945 Une grande fille toute simple
- 1945 Jean Baptiste le mal aimé
- 1945 La Sainte Famille
- 1947 La petite hutte
- 1948 Les Œufs de l'autruche
- 1949 Nina
- 1950 Bobosse
- 1951 La main de César
- 1951 Lorsque l'enfant paraît
- 1952 Hélène ou la joie de vivre
- 1953 Patience et impatiences
- 1954 Le Mari, la Femme et la Mort
- 1955 L'Amour fou ou la première surprise
- 1957 La Mamma
- 1960 Les Glorieuses et une femme qui dit la vérité
- 1962 La Coquine
- 1963 La Voyante
- 1963 Un amour qui ne finit pas
- 1965 Un contentement raisonnable
- 1966 La Locomotive
- 1969 On ne sait jamais
- 1972 La Claque
- 1974 La boîte à couleurs
- 1982 Le rideau rouge, portraits et souvenirs
- 1982 La vie est trop courte
- 1983 Rideau gris et habit vert
- 1987 La petite chatte est morte
- 1987 Mesdames, Mesdemoiselles, Messieurs
- 1987 Treize comédies en un acte

== Honours and awards ==
- Officier of the Order of Legion of Honour
- Commandeur of the Ordre National du Mérite
- Commandeur of the Ordre des Arts et des Lettres

== Filmography ==
- Une grande fille toute simple, directed by Jacques Manuel (France, 1948, based on the play Une grande fille toute simple)
- Lorsque l'enfant paraît, directed by Michel Boisrond (France, 1956, based on the play Lorsque l'enfant paraît)
- The Little Hut, directed by Mark Robson (1957, based on the play La petite hutte)
- The Ostrich Has Two Eggs, directed by Denys de La Patellière (France, 1957, based on the play Les Œufs de l'autruche)
- Nina, directed by Jean Boyer (France, 1959, based on the play Nina)
- Bobosse, directed by Étienne Périer (France, 1959, based on the play Bobosse)
