= The Ostrich Has Two Eggs =

1957 film

- Directed by: Denys de La Patellière
- Written by: Shervan Sidery; Frédéric Grendel; Denys de La Patellière
- Based on: Ostrich Eggs by André Roussin
- Produced by: Maurice Teyssier
- Starring: Pierre Fresnay; Simone Renant; Georges Poujouly
- Cinematography: Pierre Petit
- Edited by: Monique Isnardon; Robert Isnardon
- Music by: Henri Sauguet
- Production company: Vauban Productions
- Distributed by: Jeannic Films
- Release date: 30 August 1957
- Running time: 82 minutes
- Country: France
- Language: French

The Ostrich Has Two Eggs (French: Les oeufs de l'autruche) is a 1957 French comedy film directed by Denys de La Patellière and starring Pierre Fresnay, Simone Renant and Georges Poujouly. It was based on a play by André Roussin.

The film's sets were designed by the art director Paul-Louis Boutié.

== Synopsis ==
A father sticks his head in a sand like an ostrich, while his two growing children become increasingly sexually experienced.

== Cast ==
- Pierre Fresnay as Hippolyte Barjus
- Simone Renant as Thérèse Barjus
- Georges Poujouly as Roger Barjus
- Mady Berry as Leonie
- Paul Mercey as le barman bavard
- Yoko Tani as la comtesse Yoko
- Guy Bertil as le journaliste
- André Roussin as Henri
- Marguerite Pierry as Mme. Grombert
- François Chaumette as M. Marlatier

== Bibliography ==
- Goble, Alan. The Complete Index to Literary Sources in Film. Walter de Gruyter, 1999.
