= The Last Viking (1997 film) =

1997 film directed by Jesper W. Nielsen

- Directed by: Jesper W. Nielsen
- Written by: Mikael Olsen
- Produced by: Peter Aalbæk Jensen; Ib Tardini
- Starring: Holger Thaarup; Kim Bodnia; Per Oscarsson
- Cinematography: Erik Zappon
- Edited by: Valdís Óskarsdóttir
- Music by: Joachim Holbek
- Production companies: Zentropa; Trust Film
- Distributed by: Zentropa
- Release dates: 17 January 1997 (Denmark); 21 April 2000 (Sweden)
- Running time: 88 minutes
- Countries: Denmark; Sweden
- Language: Danish

The Last Viking (Danish: Den sidste viking) is a Danish-Swedish children's film released in 1997 and directed by Jesper W. Nielsen. The film stars Holger Thaarup, Kim Bodnia and Per Oscarsson.

== Plot ==
A Viking boy, Harald dreams of becoming a warrior like his father Agne. King Grimnir imposes new taxes to collect from the people. However, chieftain Agne refuses to surrender his city's ships to the king and cooperates with the rebels. The king's soldiers soon come to raid the village. The village is set on fire, some of the inhabitants are killed and the rest taken prisoner, and they are ordered to build a new ship for the king's fleet. Harald and the dwarf Gunga go to great lengths to get the city's drunken ship craftsman to complete the ship.

== Cast ==
Cast adapted from the Danish Film Database:

- Holger Thaarup as Harald
- René Benjamin Hansen as Bjarke
- Moa Lagercrantz as Eisa
- Bjørn Floberg as Thorgrim
- Kim Bodnia as Sigbard
- Erik Wedersøe as Agne
- Per Oscarsson as Skrælling
- Ricky Danielsson as Gunga
- Bjarne Henriksen as Svarre
- Troels Trier as Skjalden
- Elo Sjøgren as Hofsnog
- Torbjørn Hummel as Hirdmand
- Peeter Kard as Høvding

== Release ==
The Last Viking was distributed in Danish cinemas by Zentropa from 17 January 1997. It was released in Swedish cinemas by Triangelfilm on 21 April 2000.

== Reception ==
The Swedish Nöjesguiden said The Last Viking does most things wrong, describing the story as unfocused and infantile and the dialogue as poorly crafted. The critic compared the acting to amateur theatre from the 1960s, with the exception of Per Oscarsson's "mumbling and swearing".
