= Yori Bertin =

French actress (born 1940)

- Born: Catherine Chassin-Briault; 28 December 1940; Bidart, France
- Occupation: Actress

Catherine Chassin-Briault (born 28 December 1940), known as Yori Bertin, is a French actress known for her roles in Elevator to the Gallows (1958), The Nun (1966) and La gageure imprévue (1973).
