= Niels Busk =

Danish politician

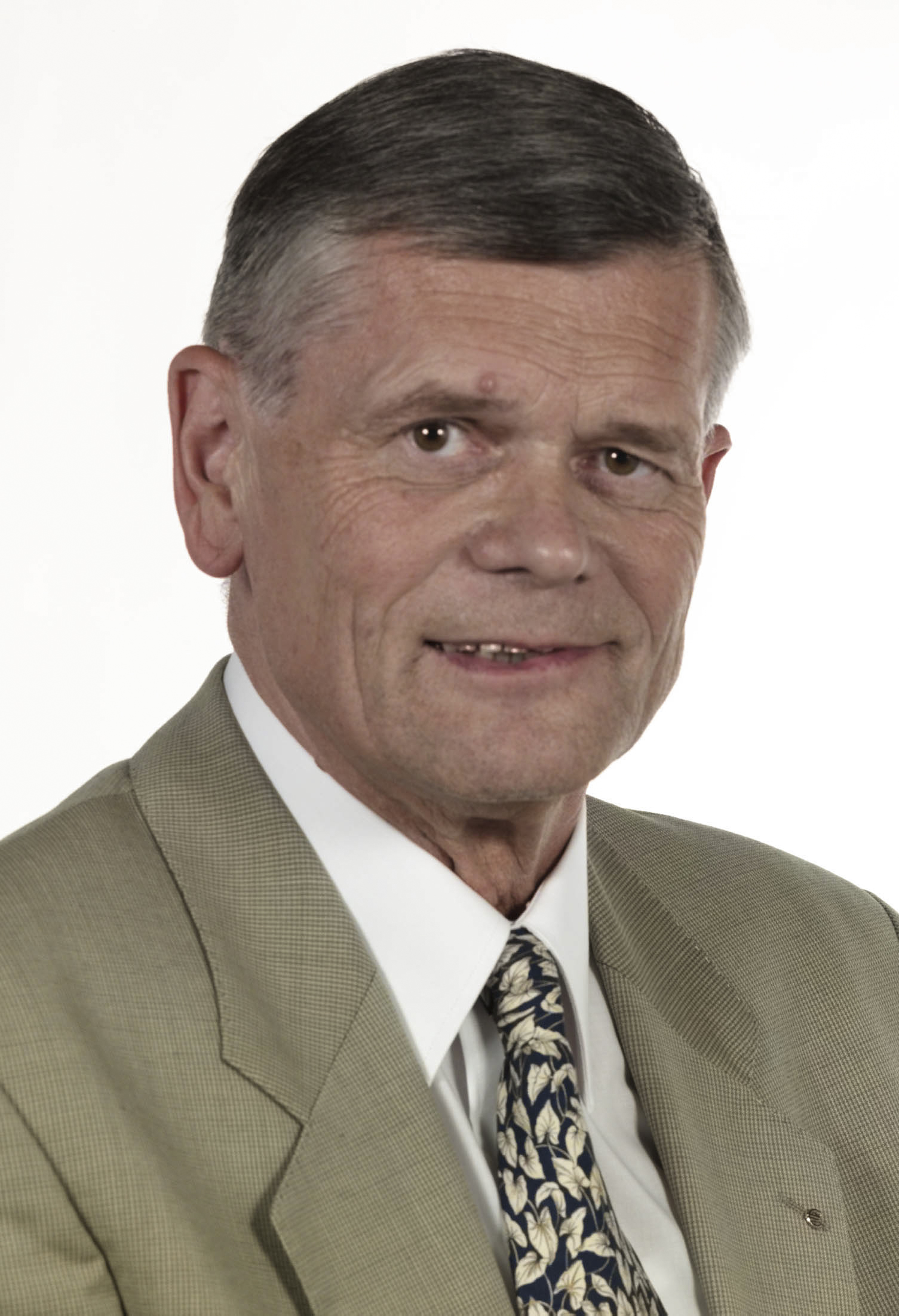
Busk in 1999

Niels Busk (born 2 August 1942 in Vadum) is a Danish politician and former Member of the European Parliament from 1999 to 2009 with the Venstre party, part of the Alliance of Liberals and Democrats for Europe. He sat on the European Parliament's Committee on Agriculture and Rural Development and its Committee on Fisheries.

He was a substitute for the Committee on the Environment, Public Health and Food Safety and was a member of the Delegation to the ACP-EU Joint Parliamentary Assembly.

== Education ==
- 1959: Lower secondary school-leaving certificate
- 1962: Danish Royal Lifeguards
- 1963: Lieutenant
- 1965: Dalum Agricultural College

== Career ==
- Since 1981: Major in the Reserve
- Since 1981: Chairman of the vice-chairman and board member of various trade organisations, financial companies and farming bodies
- Since 1999: Member of the European Parliament
- Since 1999: Member of the Executive of Venstre, Denmark's Liberal Party
- Knight of the Dannebrog
- Commendation for good service in the national defence reserve force
- Nobel Peace Prize as active member of UN Peace-Keeping Forces
- UN Emergency Force decoration

== See also ==
- 2004 European Parliament election in Denmark
