= The Five Obstructions =

2003 film

- Directed by: Lars von Trier; Jørgen Leth
- Written by: Lars von Trier; Jørgen Leth
- Based on: The Perfect Human by Jørgen Leth
- Produced by: Carsten Holst
- Starring: Lars von Trier; Jørgen Leth; Claus Nissen; Daniel Hernandez Rodriguez; Patrick Bauchau
- Distributed by: Zentropa Real ApS; Wajnbrosse Productions; Koch-Lorber Films
- Release dates: 11 September 2003 (TIFF); 21 November 2003 (Denmark)
- Running time: 90 minutes
- Country: Denmark
- Languages: Danish; English; French; Spanish

The Five Obstructions is a 2003 Danish documentary film directed by Lars von Trier and Jørgen Leth. The film is conceived as a documentary, but incorporates lengthy sections of experimental films produced by the filmmakers. The premise is that Trier has created a challenge for his friend and mentor, Jørgen Leth, another renowned filmmaker. Lars von Trier's favorite film is Leth's The Perfect Human, and Trier gives Leth the task of remaking The Perfect Human five times, each time with a different "obstruction" (or obstacle) imposed by Trier.

It has been said that "Both this film and Dogville show a more mature Trier, one who is more aware of and accountable to the full implications of the torture, suffering and victimization he has employed in his films, especially in exploring how easily those who victimize others in the name of righteousness become victims [of] their own self-righteousness."

== The obstructions ==
1. 12 frames, answers, cuba, no set: Leth must remake the film in Cuba, with no set, and with no shot lasting longer than twelve frames, and he must answer the questions posed in the original film; Leth successfully completes this task.
2. A miserable place, don't show it, Jørgen Leth is the man, the meal: Leth must remake the film in the worst place in the world but not show that place onscreen; additionally, Leth must himself play the role of "the man". The meal must be included, but the woman is not to be included. Leth remakes the film in the red light district of Mumbai, only partially hiding it behind a translucent screen.
3. Complete freedom or back to Bombay: Because Leth failed to complete the second task perfectly, Trier punishes him, telling him to either remake the film in any way he chooses, or else to repeat it again with the second obstruction in Mumbai. Leth chooses the first option and remakes the film in Brussels, using split-screen effects.
4. Cartoon: Leth must remake the film as a cartoon. He does so with the aid of Bob Sabiston, a specialist in rotoscoping, who creates animated versions of shots from the previous films. As such the final product is technically an animation but not a cartoon. Nevertheless, Trier considers the task to be completed successfully.
5. Lars von Trier will make the last obstruction, Jørgen Leth will be credited as director, Jørgen Leth will read a text written by Lars von Trier: The fifth obstruction is that Trier has already made the fifth version, but it must be credited as Leth's, and Leth must read a voice-over narration, ostensibly from his own perspective but in fact one written by Trier.

== Collaboration with Martin Scorsese ==
In 2010, Variety reported rumors that Lars von Trier, Martin Scorsese, and Robert De Niro planned to work on a remake of Scorsese's film Taxi Driver with the film made with same restrictions as were used in The Five Obstructions. In 2014, Taxi Driver screenwriter Paul Schrader said that it was not being made. He said, "It was a terrible idea" and "in Marty's mind, it never was something that should be done."

== Reception ==
The Five Obstructions received positive reviews from critics. It holds a 79/100 on Metacritic, and Rotten Tomatoes reports 88% approval among 59 critics. It was later voted one of the 30 best films of the 2000s in a poll for Sight & Sound.
