= The Perfect Human =

Det perfekte menneske
- Directed by: Jørgen Leth
- Written by: Jørgen Leth
- Starring: Claus Nissen; Majken Algren Nielsen; Jørgen Leth (voice)
- Cinematography: Henning Camre
- Release date: 14 June 1968
- Running time: 13 minutes
- Country: Denmark
- Language: Danish

The Perfect Human (Danish: Det perfekte menneske) is a cult short film in black and white by Jørgen Leth, lasting 13 minutes, about a middle-class Danish couple performing everyday rituals.

The film examines human behavior in a suave, pseudo-scientific way. It depicts well-dressed actors, a man and a woman, both labelled "the perfect human" in a detached manner, "functioning" in a blank boundless room, as though they were subjects in a zoo. The tone of world-weary detachment is created through a voice-over providing comments on their mundane actions.

The film was later seen in five different versions when Leth was challenged by filmmaker Lars von Trier, which were compiled in The Five Obstructions.
