= Henrik Bo Nielsen =

Danish arts administrator

Henrik Bo Nielsen (born 23 April 1961) is a Danish arts administrator. In December 2018 he was presented as the new Executive Director, DR Culture, Children and Youth (DR). He was CEO of ROMU, an umbrella organisation for 10 museums in the Roskilde area from 2017 to 2019. He was CEO of Dagbladet Information from 1991 to 2007 and of the Danish Film Institute from 2007 to 2017.

== Biography ==
Nielsen was born in Vadum close to Aalborg on 23 April 1961. He graduated from Aalborg Katedralskole in 1980 and later began to study law. He became the leader of a language school in Aalborg when he was 22 and was later transferred to its headquarters in Copenhagen. He was CEO of Dagbladet Information from 1991 to 2007. He then served as CEO of the Danish Film Institute from 2007 until 2017. He succeeded Frank Birkebæk as CEO of Romu in 2017.
