= Christian Bonke =

Danish documentary filmmaker and screenwriter

Christian Holten Bonke (born 13 August 1973, Fredericia) is a Danish documentary filmmaker and screenwriter. He has directed music videos, commercials and documentary series for television, most recently Uffe’s Alternative. (2 episodes, DR 2015). He was educated at the National Film School of Denmark, graduating in 2005.

His film Ballroom Dancer (2011), won several awards from around the world. The film is a documentary portrait of a retired ballroom dancer, who attempts to return to the world elite; a quest with a high personal cost. This gives Bonke the opportunity to work with a variety of dramatic and visual tricks, perhaps more typical from feature film. We see examples of this in First Love (2007), Ballroom dancer and Ejersbo.

In the TV documentary Uffe's Alternative, he follows politician Uffe Elbæk with his camera in the hectic period from the formation of the party The Alternative in November 2013, through to the June 2015 general election. The film joins the documentary style of the observing camera, or direct cinema, often used in political documentaries. Examples of note include US D.A. Penne Baker's The War Room (1993) about Bill Clinton's presidential campaign in 1992, and Christoffer Guldbrandsen's Fogh behind the facade (2003) on Danish prime minister Anders Fogh Rasmussen's negotiations around the enlargement of the EU in 2002.

== Filmography ==
- 2015: Ejersbo
- 2015: Uffes Alternativ
- 2015: Mathias Reumert
- 2014: Upassende
- 2012: Nu som Mennesker
- 2011: Ballroom Dancer
- 2008: Real Estate - 30 min. DR2
- 2007: First Love
- 2007: Rasmus Nøhr
- 2006: Piger fra Havdrup
- 2006: Roskilde - Co-director
