= Walter Albuquerque Mello =

Brazilian archivist

Walter Albuquerque Mello (born 5 November 1928) is a Brazilian archivist. He is the mastermind of the Public Archive of Distrito Federal and one of the creators of the Festival de Brasília do Cinema Brasileiro, work for which he received the Troféu Candango in 2013.

Albuquerque Mello was born in Salvador, Bahia. He was a member of the jury at the 21st Berlin International Film Festival. In 1997, he was given the Freedom of Brasília.
