= Koko-di Koko-da =

2019 film

- Film poster
- Directed by: Johannes Nyholm
- Written by: Johannes Nyholm
- Produced by: Johannes Nyholm
- Starring: Leif Edlund; Ylva Gallon; Peter Belli
- Cinematography: Tobias Höiem-Flyckt; Johan Lundborg
- Edited by: Johannes Nyholm
- Music by: Olof Cornéer; Simon Ohlsson
- Production companies: Beofilm; Film i Väst
- Distributed by: Smorgasbord Picture House; Dark Star Pictures
- Release date: 25 January 2019 (Sundance)
- Running time: 89 minutes
- Countries: Sweden; Denmark
- Languages: Swedish; Danish

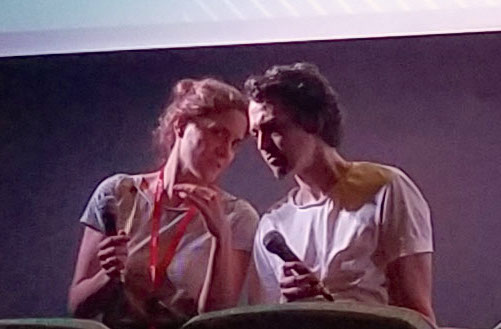
Johannes Nyholm (right) presenting 'Koko-di Koko-da' at Buenos Aires International Festival of Independent Cinema 2019.

Koko-di Koko-da is a 2019 Swedish-Danish surrealist dark fantasy psychological horror film directed, produced and written by Johannes Nyholm. The film tells the story of a struggling couple on a camping trip in the woods to save their marriage, after the tragic death of their daughter on her eighth birthday during a vacation in Denmark three years prior, who find themselves in a time loop of agonizing torture, humiliating slapstick, and surreal dreams at the hands of a band of antagonistic nursery rhyme characters depicted on a music box, which they had purchased for their daughter as a birthday gift prior to her death and birthday. The two have to find a way to heal their broken marriage, overcome their grief, and escape the macabre time loop of torture and murder.

== Plot ==
Swedish couple Tobias and Elin dote on their only daughter, Maja. For her eighth birthday, they purchase her a music box depicting three nursery rhyme characters from an antique store. However, during their vacation to Skagen, Denmark for Maja's birthday, Elin is sent to the hospital due to an allergic reaction to shellfish from her mussel pizza at lunch. This is followed by the sudden death of Maja in her sleep on her birthday (due to the mussels as she and Elin shared the pizza). Stricken with grief, Tobias and Elin's marriage begins to deteriorate as a result. It is unclear whether or not that they would intend to conceive another child.

Three years later in Sweden, Tobias and Elin go on a camping trip for vacation. They bicker constantly throughout the trip. As night falls, the couple is unable to find the campground they had intended to stay at and, despite Elin's protests, Tobias sets up camp in a wooded area off the side of the road. In the early morning, Elin leaves the tent to urinate and is accosted by three people and a dog who resemble the nursery rhyme characters from Maja's music box: the jovial and sharply dressed leader Mog, the hulking and animalistic Sampo - who carries a dead white dog at all times, and the stoic, witchlike Cherry - who owns a vicious brown Staffordshire Bull Terrier. They torment Elin while Tobias watches from the tent, unsure of what to do, and eventually both are murdered.

Tobias and Elin inexplicably awaken again, with Elin having no memory of the previous events and Tobias chalking it up to being just a dream. When Elin leaves the tent, the two again encounter the strange trio and are again murdered. As the cycle repeats, Tobias begins to understand that they are trapped in a time loop and attempts various means of escape with each new cycle, only to be killed and awaken each time. Eventually, a loop starts in which Elin awakens with Tobias gone and encounters their wrecked car with Tobias nowhere to be found. Elin follows an enigmatic white cat and enters a building in which the three characters perform a shadow play for her; two parent rabbits have a child who dies, and the parent rabbits are subsequently driven apart by their grief.

As another loop starts, Tobias awakens in a panic and drags Elin to the car for another attempt at escape. They hit and kill a dog resembling the dead dog belonging to the trio and crash their car in a ditch. In their despair, Tobias and Elin comfort one another. Their fate is left ambiguous, but it is implied that through their love and acceptance of their mutual grief, they have escaped the time loop.

== Cast ==
- Leif Edlund as Tobias
- Ylva Gallon as Elin
- Katarina Jakobson as Maja
- Peter Belli as Mog
- Morad Baloo Khatchadorian as Sampo
- Brandy Litmanen as Cherry

== Release ==
Koko-di Koko-da was screened in the World Cinema Dramatic Competition section at the 2019 Sundance Film Festival.

== Reception ==
=== Critical response ===
On review aggregator Rotten Tomatoes, Koko-di Koko-da holds an approval rating of 80%, based on 61 reviews, and an average rating of 6.2/10. Its consensus reads, "Using an effectively creepy setting and a beguilingly evasive approach, Koko-Di Koko-Da takes a chilling look at the long tail of grief."

== See also ==
- List of films featuring time loops
