= Ang.: Lone =

1970 film

- Film poster
- Directed by: Franz Ernst
- Written by: Franz Ernst; Charlotte Strandgaard
- Produced by: Mogens Skot-Hansen
- Starring: Pernille Kløvedal
- Cinematography: Peter Roos
- Edited by: Janus Billeskov Jansen
- Music by: Kim Larsen
- Release date: 29 June 1970
- Running time: 97 minutes
- Country: Denmark
- Language: Danish

Ang.: Lone is a 1970 Danish drama film directed by Franz Ernst. It was entered into the 21st Berlin International Film Festival where it won a Special Recognition award. The film was also selected as the Danish entry for the Best Foreign Language Film at the 43rd Academy Awards, but was not accepted as a nominee.

== Cast ==
- Pernille Kløvedal as Lone
- Margit Iversen as Margit
- Steen Kaalø as Niels
- Peter Engberg as Chauffør I jeep
- Katrine Jensenius as Margits veninde
- Kim Larsen as Ven til Margits veninde
- Leif Mønsted as Kvaksalver
- Flemming Dyjak as Drager
- Lisbet Lundquist
- Gitte Reingaard
- Niels Schwalbe
- Elinor Brungaard

== See also ==
- List of submissions to the 43rd Academy Awards for Best Foreign Language Film
- List of Danish submissions for the Academy Award for Best Foreign Language Film
