= Erik Wedersøe =

Danish actor, director and writer (1938–2011)

- Born: 18 July 1938; Helsingør, Denmark
- Died: 27 September 2011 (aged 73); Copenhagen, Denmark
- Occupation: Actor
- Years active: 1966–2003

Erik Wedersøe (18 July 1938 – 27 September 2011) was a Danish actor, director and author. Among his most famous roles are the psychiatrist "Pigernes Ole" in Lars von Trier's Riget II and Ulf Thomsen in the Emmy awarded (2002) Danish television series Rejseholdet (2000–2003).

== Filmography ==
=== Film, actor ===
- Mennesker mødes og sød musik opstår i hjertet (1967)
- Ta' lidt solskin (1969)
- Helle for Lykke (1969)
- Bella (1970)
- Løgneren (1970)
- Præsten i Vejlby (1972)
- Farlige kys (1972)
- Den dobbelte mand (1976)
- Skal vi danse først? (1979)
- Rainfox (1984)
- Skyggen af Emma (1988)
- Drengene fra Sankt Petri (1991)
- Riget I (1994)
- Elsker, elsker ikke (1995)
- Den sidste viking (1996)
- Riget II (1997)
- Ørnens øje (1997)
- Idioterne (1998)
- Fruen på Hamre (2000)
- Max (2000)
- Ulvepigen Tinke (2002)

=== Film, director ===
- Anna (2000)

=== Television ===
- Smuglerne (1970–1971)
- Bryggeren (1997)
- Rejseholdet (2000–2003)

== Books ==
- Søforklaring (1979)
- 18 tons drømme (1982)
- Syd om solen. Anden søforklaring. Skrevet på havet og på Tahiti – 1981–82 (1983)
- Nedenom og hjem : en helt tredje søforklaring (1986)
- Salamaleikum : om flygtninge i den tredje verden og om Danmark (1986)
- I drømmenes kølvand : historien om jordomsejleren Gitte Grys bygning og 41.000 sømils rejser på oceanerne (1991)
- Danmark dejligst (1991)
- Min Jago: En skuespillers arbejde med den berømte og berygtede rolle Jago i Shakespeares drama Othello (1992)
- Hvis luften kunne bære: Erindringsglimt (2005)
