= European Cross Media Academy =

- Established: 2012
- Affiliations: CILECT
- Location: Copenhagen, Denmark
- Website: www.eucroma.com

The European Cross Media Academy, or EUCROMA, is a European advanced level training program in cross-media production based in Copenhagen, Denmark. It is open to students from European educational institutions with experience in games and animation courses, bringing them together in professionally configured games and animation teams.

EUCROMA was established at the initiative of the European Union's MEDIA Programme, which supports it financially, and is modelled over the Danish DADIU, which has existed since 2005.

== Partnership ==
The education is a result of collaboration between a number of European institutions: The Danish DADIU, the National Film School of Denmark, the University of Abertay Dundee, Cologne Game Lab, The Animation Workshop, the University of Malta and the Moholy-Nagy University of Art and Design.
