= 21st Berlin International Film Festival =

1971 film festival in West Berlin, Germany

- Location: West Berlin, Germany
- Founded: 1951
- Awards: Golden Bear: The Garden of the Finzi-Continis
- Festival date: 26 June – 6 July 1971
- Website: Website

Berlin International Film Festival chronology
- 22nd 20th

The 21st annual Berlin International Film Festival was held from 26 June to 6 July 1971. The Young Filmmakers Forum (in 1987 renamed International Forum for New Cinema) section was introduced at the festival.

The Golden Bear was awarded to The Garden of the Finzi-Continis directed by Vittorio De Sica.

== Jury ==
The following people were announced as being on the jury for the festival:

- Bjørn Rasmussen, Danish writer and film critic - Jury President
- Ida Ehre, West-German actress and director of the Hamburg Kammerspiele theatre
- Walter Albuquerque Mello, Brazilian co-founder of the Festival de Brasília
- Paul Claudon, French producer
- Kenneth Harper, British producer
- Mani Kaul, Indian filmmaker
- Charlotte Kerr, West-German actress and filmmaker
- Rex Reed, American film critic
- Giancarlo Zagni, Italian filmmaker

== Official Sections ==
=== Main Competition ===
The following films were in competition for the Golden Bear award:

English title	Original title	Director(s)	Production Country
1501 1/2		Paul B. Price	United States
Ang.: Lone		Franz Ernst	Denmark
Argentina, mayo de 1969: Los caminos de la liberación		Octavio Getino, Nemesio Juárez, Rodolfo Kuhn, Jorge Martín, Humberto Ríos, Eliseo Subiela and Pablo Szir	Argentina
Bless the Beasts and Children		Stanley Kramer	United States
Bloomfield		Richard Harris	United Kingdom, Israel
Blushing Charlie	Lyckliga skitar	Vilgot Sjöman	Sweden
The Cat	Le Chat	Pierre Granier-Deferre	France, Italy
The Decameron	Il Decameron	Pier Paolo Pasolini	Italy
Desperate Characters		Frank D. Gilroy	United States
Die Ordnung		Bohumil Stepan and Boris von Borresholm	West Germany
Dulcima		Frank Nesbitt	United Kingdom
The First Day	Die ersten Tage	Herbert Holba	Austria
Four Nights of a Dreamer	Quatre nuits d'un rêveur	Robert Bresson	France, Italy
The Garden of the Finzi-Continis	Il giardino dei Finzi-Contini	Vittorio De Sica	Italy
He Who Loves in a Glass House	Wer im Glashaus liebt... der Graben	Michael Verhoeven	West Germany
How Tasty Was My Little Frenchman	Como Era Gostoso o Meu Francês	Nelson Pereira dos Santos	Brazil
In continuo		Vlatko Gilić	Yugoslavia
Jaider, the Lonely Hunter	Jaider, der einsame Jäger	Volker Vogeler	West Germany
Long Live Death	Viva la muerte	Fernando Arrabal	France, Tunisia
Love Is War		Ragnar Lasse-Henriksen	Norway
Ninì Tirabusciò: the woman who invented "the move"	Ninì Tirabusciò: la donna che inventò la mossa	Marcello Fondato	Italy, France
Red Wheat	Rdeče klasje	Živojin Pavlović	Yugoslavia
Rendezvous at Bray	Rendez-vous à Bray	André Delvaux	France, Belgium
To Love Again	愛ふたたび	Kon Ichikawa	Japan
The Touch	Beröringen	Ingmar Bergman	Sweden, United States
Whity		Rainer Werner Fassbinder	West Germany

=== Young Filmmakers Forum ===
- The Murder of Fred Hampton, directed by Howard Alk (United States)
- Bananera libertad, directed by Peter von Gunten (Switzerland)
- La bandera que levantamos, directed by Mario Jacob and Eduardo Terra (Uruguay)
- La Bataille des dix millions, directed by Chris Marker and Valérie Mayoux (France, Cuba)
- The Ceremony, directed by Nagisa Ōshima (Japan)
- Chicago 70, directed by Kerry Feltham (United States, Canada)
- Geschichten vom Kübelkind, directed by Edgar Reitz and Ula Stöckl (West Germany)
- The Big Mess, directed by Alexander Kluge (West Germany)
- Ich liebe dich, ich töte dich, directed by Uwe Brandner (West Germany)
- James ou pas, directed by Michel Soutter (Switzerland)
- Leave Me Alone, directed by Gerhard Theuring (West Germany)
- La memoria di Kunz, directed by Ivo Barnabò Micheli (Italy)
- Monangambé, directed by Sarah Maldoror (Angola)
- It Is Not the Homosexual Who Is Perverse, But the Society in Which He Lives, directed by Rosa von Praunheim (West Germany)
- No pincha!, directed by Tobias Engel (Burkina Faso, France)
- Olimpia agli amici, directed by Adriano Aprà (Italy)
- Ossessione, directed by Luchino Visconti (Italy)
- Ostia, directed by Sergio Citti (Italy)
- Ramparts of Clay, directed by Jean-Louis Bertuccelli (France, Algeria)
- The Reconstruction, directed by Theo Angelopoulos (Greece)
- The Salamander, directed by Alain Tanner (Switzerland, France)
- Happiness, directed by Aleksandr Medvedkin (Soviet Union)
- A Sixth Part of the World, directed by Dziga Vertov (Soviet Union)
- Tropici, directed by Gianni Amico (Italy)
- Umano, non umano, directed by Mario Schifano (Italy)
- Voto + fusil, directed by Helvio Soto (Chile)
- Wechma, directed by Hamid Benani (Morocco)
- The Woman's Film, directed by Louise Alaimo, Judy Smith and Ellen Sorren (United States)
- WR: Mysteries of the Organism, directed by Dušan Makavejev (Yugoslavia, West Germany)

== Official Awards ==
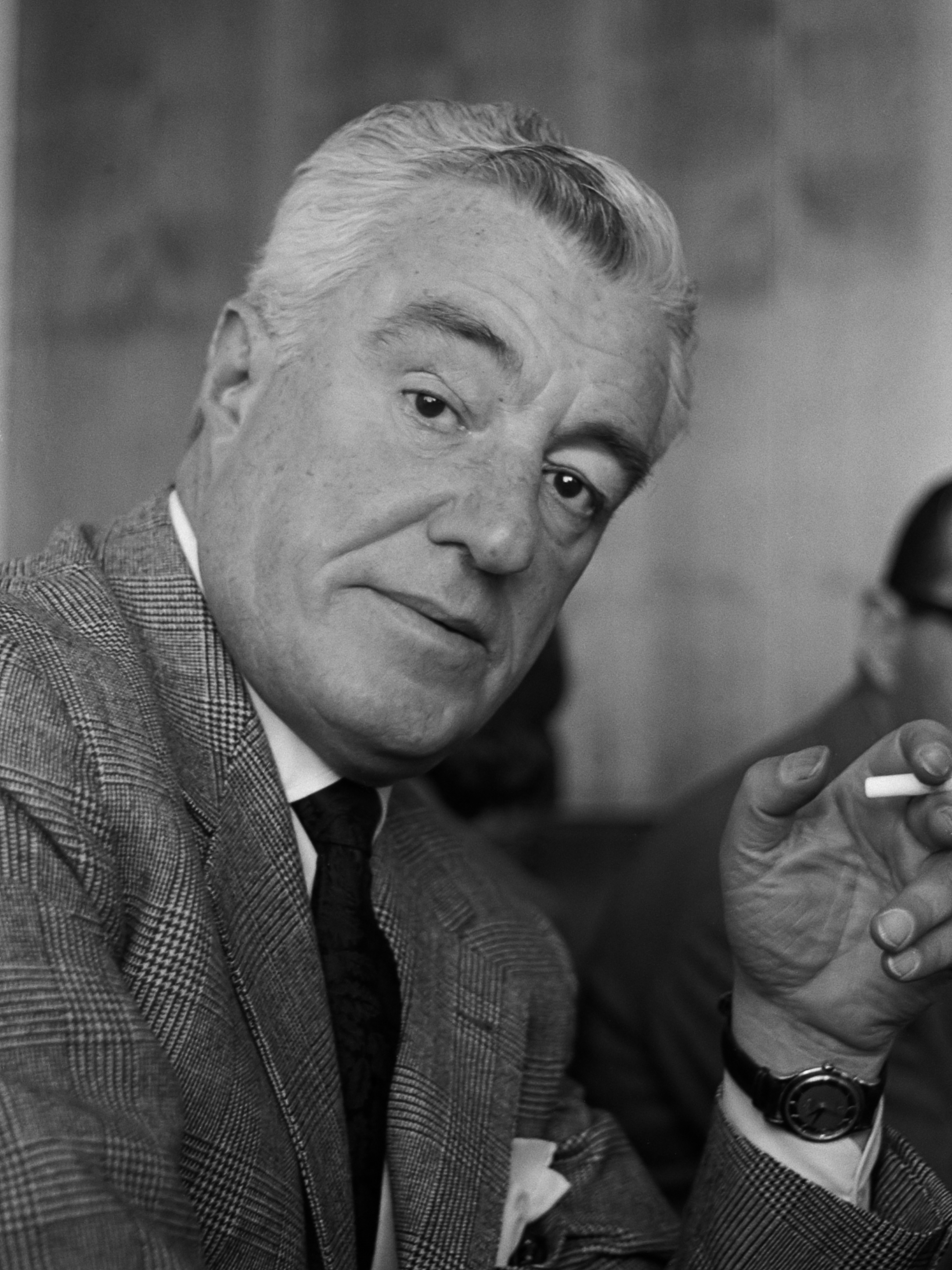
Vittorio De Sica, winner of the Golden Bear at the event

The following prizes were awarded by the Jury:

- Golden Bear: The Garden of the Finzi-Continis by Vittorio De Sica
- Silver Bear for Best Actress:
  - Simone Signoret for Le Chat
  - Shirley MacLaine for Desperate Characters
- Silver Bear for Best Actor: Jean Gabin for Le Chat
- Silver Bear for an outstanding single achievement:
  - Ragnar Lasse-Henriksen for Love Is War
  - Frank D. Gilroy for Desperate Characters
- Silver Bear Extraordinary Jury Prize: The Decameron by Pier Paolo Pasolini
- Special Recognition: Ang.: Lone by Franz Ernst
