= The Double Man (1976 film) =

1976 film

- Directed by: Franz Ernst
- Written by: Franz Ernst; Kirsten Thorup
- Produced by: Steen Herdel; Ib Tardini; Vibeke Windeløv
- Starring: Erik Wedersøe
- Cinematography: Dirk Brüel
- Edited by: Christian Hartkopp
- Music by: Fuzzy
- Release date: 19 April 1976
- Running time: 91 minutes
- Country: Denmark
- Language: Danish

The Double Man (Danish: Den dobbelte mand) is a 1976 Danish crime film directed by Franz Ernst and starring Erik Wedersøe.

== Cast ==
- Erik Wedersøe - Christian Mortensen
- Peter Belli - Mikael Mortensen
- Poul Reichhardt - Mortensen
- Chili Turèll - Janne (as Inge Margrethe Svendsen)
- Lane Lind - Eva
- Lotte Hermann - Lily
- Claus Nissen - Verner
- Morten Grunwald - Hugo
- Martin Miehe-Renard - Kurt
- Frederik Frederiksen - Direktør Holm
- Susanne Heinrich - Gurli
- Preben Harris - Gorilla
- Michael Bastian - Gorilla
- Willy Rathnov - Bossen
- Masja Dessau - Luder
