= National Film School of Denmark =

Film school

- Den Danske Filmskole
- Type: Public university
- Established: 1966; 60 years ago
- Director: Kristoffer Hegnsvad
- Administrative staff: 52
- Students: 108 (2025)
- Location: Copenhagen, Denmark; 55°40′52″N 12°36′20″E
- Campus: Copenhagen
- Website: filmskolen.dk/en

The National Film School of Denmark (Danish: Den Danske Filmskole) is an independent institution under the Danish Ministry of Cultural Affairs. It was established in 1966 and is based on Holmen in the harbour of Copenhagen.

== Courses ==
There are nine study programmes available: fiction directing, documentary directing, cinematography, script writing, editing, sound, animation film producing, and production design. The number of students is 104 spread across two year groups. All courses are 4-year programmes.

The school is an art school but practical knowledge is also very important. The teaching programme is a mixture of theoretical and practical training and includes a large number of exercises and productions. The students' final project is a film produced on a professional level and presented to the public on national TV. All students must pass an entrance test including both practical exercises and interviews.

Director Poul Nesgaard headed the school between 1992 and 2014, when film editor Vinca Wiedemann took over.

== Directors ==
Year	Keeper
1966–1969	Jens Christian Lauritzen
1969–1975	None, run as a film-commune
1975–1982	Henning Camre
1992–2014	Poul Nesgaard
2014–2019	Vinca Wiedemann
2019–2021	Bo Damgaard
2021– May 2024	Tine Fischer
Jan 2025 –	Kristoffer Hegnsvad

== Alumni ==
- Åke Sandgren (1982)
- Amanda Kernell
- Anders August (2007)
- Anders Morgenthaler (2002)
- Anders Refn (1969)
- Anthony Dod Mantle (1989)
- Bille August (1973, graduated as cinematographer)
- Carsten Fromberg (1989)
- Christian Holten Bonke (2005)
- Christoffer Boe (2001)
- Dagur Kári (1999)
- Daniel Espinosa (2003)
- Eva Mulvad (2001)
- Jonas Elmer (1995)
- Katrin Ottarsdóttir
- Kim Fupz Aakeson (1996)
- Krass Clement (1978)
- Lars Von Trier (1982)
- Lisa Aschan
- Lone Scherfig (1984)
- Manuel Alberto Claro (2001)
- May el-Toukhy (2009)
- Niels Arden Oplev (1989)
- Ole Christian Madsen (1993)
- Per Fly (1993)
- Pernille Fischer Christensen (1999)
- Peter Flinth (1993)
- Phie Ambo (2003)
- Reza Parsa (1995)
- Rumle Hammerich (1979)
- Sami Saif (1997)
- Susanne Bier (1987)
- Thomas Vinterberg (1993)
- Tobias Lindholm (2007)
- Vladimir Oravsky (1982)

== See also ==
- European Cross Media Academy
