= Jacques Boigelot =

Belgian film director and screenwriter (1929–2023)

- Born: 23 August 1929
- Died: 4 March 2023 (aged 93)
- Occupations: Film director, screenwriter
- Years active: 1951–1975

Jacques Boigelot (23 August 1929 – 4 March 2023) was a Belgian film director and screenwriter. He was for many years the head of the French Belgian television film department. His film Paix sur les champs (1970) was nominated for the Academy Award for Best Foreign Language Film.

Boigelot died on 4 March 2023, at the age of 93.
