= Franz Ernst =

Danish film director (born 1938)

- Born: 30 July 1938 (age 87); Assens, Denmark
- Occupations: Film director Screenwriter
- Years active: 1965–present

Franz Ernst (born 30 July 1938) is a Danish film director and screenwriter. He has directed eleven films since 1965. His 1970 film Ang.: Lone was entered into the 21st Berlin International Film Festival where it won a Special Recognition award.

== Selected filmography ==
- Ang.: Lone (1970)
- The Double Man (1976)
