= Danish Film Institute =

Danish government agency supporting the film industry

- Logo of the Danish Film Institute, since 1999.
- Abbreviation: DFI
- Formation: 1972
- Headquarters: Copenhagen, Denmark
- Chief Executive: Tine Fischer
- Website: dfi.dk/Service/English.aspx

The Danish Film Institute (Danish: Det Danske Filminstitut; DFI) is the national Danish agency responsible for supporting and encouraging film and cinema culture, and for conserving these in the national interest. It is the successor organisation to the Danish Film Foundation (Danish: Den Danske Filmfond).

Also known as Filmhuset ("the film house"), it is located in Gothersgade in central Copenhagen. Facilities directed at the general public include a library and Cinemateket, Denmark's national film museum. Tine Fischer was appointed to take over from current director of the institute, Claus Ladegaard, from 1 August 2024.

The documentary 'Mr. Nobody Against Putin' (2026), co-produced by the DFI, won the Academy Award (Oscar) for Documentary Feature. Four Danish films have received the International Feature Film Oscar: 'Another Round' (2021), 'In a Better World' (2011), 'Pelle the Conqueror' (1989), and 'Babette's Feast' (1988).

== History ==
The Danish Film Institute was founded in 1972, replacing the Danish Film Foundation (Danish: Den Danske Filmfond). In 1996 a new Danish Film Act merged the Film Institute with Statens Filmcentral and the National Danish Film Museum with effect from the following year and at the same event the institution relocated to its current premises at Filmhuset in Gothersgade.

== Activities ==
The Danish Film Institute is active within three main areas which are subsidised:

- Production and development of all types of films
- Distribution and communication of films and film culture
- Archives and museum activities

The Film Institute presents Danish films at festivals abroad and in Denmark and subsidizes the import of foreign quality films. It maintains the Danish National Filmography (Danmarks Nationalfilmografi), a database about Danish films since 1896.

== Description and facilities ==
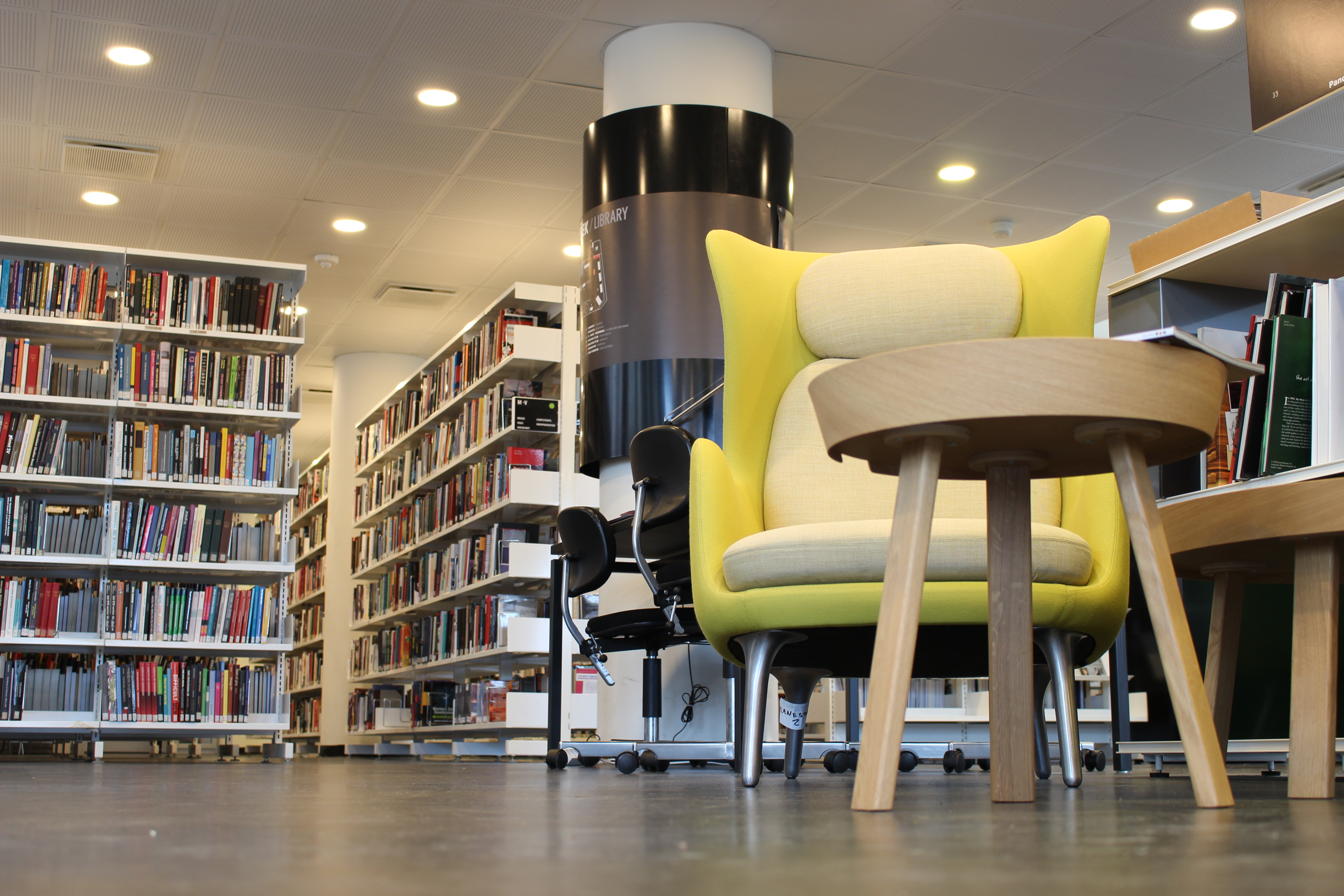
The library

The Danish Film Institute is also known as Filmhuset ("the film house") in central Copenhagen, is an institution under the Danish Ministry of Cultural Affairs, and a member of European Film Promotion, the network of European film organisations for the worldwide promotion of European film.

=== Cinemateket ===
Cinemateket is the national Danish film museum, dedicated to broaden the knowledge and interest in Danish as well as foreign film. It has three cinemas which show a combination of film classics and quality films of various themes. Occasionally contemporary films which would otherwise not reach the Danish market are shown. In the videotheque in the library it is possible to watch short and documentary films. Other facilities include a book shop, a café and a restaurant.

=== Library ===
The Danish Film Institute's library on the first floor holds 55,000 books and subscribes to 240 mainly European and American magazines. The library lends regular books—usually for a period of one month—while magazines, manuscripts and rarer publications may only be referenced on the premises.

== DFI Directors ==
Tine Fischer has been appointed director from 1 August 2024. Fischer was the founder and CEO of the CPH:DOX film festival, becoming co-CEO, with Jacob Neiiendam, of CPH:DOX, CPH PIX, and BUSTER Film Festival for Children and Youth in 2016, and then from November 2018 sole CEO for all three festivals after Neiiendam stepped down. In 2021 Fischer let Copenhagen Film Festivals to become director of the National Film School of Denmark.

Year	Director
1972–1973	Erik Hauerslev
1974–1976	Leif Feilberg
1976–1988	Finn Aabye
1988	Mona Jensen
1988–1990	Erik Crone
1990–1991	Mona Jensen
1991–1993	Bo Christensen
1993	Mona Jensen
1993–1995	Henrik Bering-Liisberg
1995–1997	Mona Jensen
1997–2007	Henning Camre
2007–2017	Henrik Bo Nielsen
2018-2024	Claus Ladegaard
2024-	Tine Fischer
