= 54th Bodil Awards =

2001 Danish film awards ceremony

- Date: 4 March 2001
- Site: Imperial Cinema, Copenhagen
- Hosted by: Peter Mygind and Birgitte Raaberg

Highlights
- Best Film: The Bench
- Best Actor: Jesper Christensen; The Bench
- Best Actress: Björk; Dancer in the Dark
- Most awards: The Bench (3)
- Most nominations: Italian For Beginners (5)

The 54th Bodil Awards were held on 4 March 2001 in the Imperial Cinema in Copenhagen, Denmark, honouring the best national and foreign films of 2000. Peter Mygind and Birgitte Raaberg hosted the event which was broadcast live on DR2.

The Bench won both the awards for Best Film and Best Actor in a leading and supporting role (Jesper Christensen and Nikolaj Kopernikus). The award for Best Actress in a Leading Role went to Björk (Dancer in the Dark) while the Best Actress in a Supporting Role award went to Lene Tiemroth for her performance in Italian For Beginners, the film which had come to the ceremony with most nominations. The only Danish award which did not go to a Zentropa production was the award for Best Cinematographer which went to Eric Kress for his work both on A Place Nearby, Flickering Lights and Miracle.

American Beauty earned the award for Best American Film while the award for Best Non-American Film went to Crouching Tiger, Hidden Dragon.

Producers Ib Tardini and Vibeke Windeløv together with managing director Peter Aalbæk Jensen received a Bodil Honorary Award for their work in Zentropa.

== Winners and nominees ==
=== Best Danish Film ===
The Bench – Per Fly

- Flickering Lights – Anders Thomas Jensen
- Dancer in the Dark – Lars von Trier
- Italian For Beginners – Lone Scherfig
- Miracle – Natasha Arthy

=== Best Actor in a Leading Role ===
Jesper Christensen – The Bench

- Anders W. Berthelsen – Italian For Beginners
- Peter Gantzler – Italian For Beginners
- Thure Lindhardt – A Place Nearby
- Søren Pilmark – Flickering Lights

=== Best Actress in a Leading Role ===
Björk – Dancer In The Dark

- Ann Eleonora Jørgensen – Italian For Beginners'
- Ghita Nørby – A Place Nearby
- Annette Støvelbæk – Italian For Beginners

=== Best Actor in a Supporting Role ===
Nicolaj Kopernikus – The Bench

- Henning Moritzen – A Place Nearby
- Ole Thestrup – Flickering Lights

=== Best Actress in a Supporting Role ===
Lene Tiemroth – Italian For Beginners

- Sarah Boberg – The Bench
- Stine Holm Joensen – The Bench

=== Johan Ankerstjerne Cinematographer Award ===
Eric Kress – A Place Nearby, Flickering Lights and Miracle

=== Best American Film ===
American Beauty

- Being John Malkovich
- The Insider
- Magnolia

=== Best Non-American Film ===
Crouching Tiger, Hidden Dragon

- Chicken Run
- East Is East
- Together
- The Road Home

=== Bodil Honorary Awards ===
- Ib Tardini, Vibeke Windeløv and Peter Aalbæk Jensen for their work in Zentropa
