= Imagine Film Festival =

Annual film festival in Amsterdam, Netherlands

- Location: Amsterdam, Netherlands
- Founded: 1991
- Awards: Sea Devil Award; Silver Méliès; Silver Scream Award
- Festival date: Annually, at the end of October
- Website: imaginefilmfestival.nl/en

The Imagine Film Festival, formerly Amsterdam Fantastic Film Festival, also known as Imagine Fantastic Film Festival or simply Imagine, is an annual film festival in Amsterdam, Netherlands. The festival was created in 1991 with a focus mainly on fantasy and horror films.

== History ==
Imagine started out as the "Weekend of Terror". After several years, this weekend turned into a full-blown festival in 1991, titled the Amsterdam Fantastic Film Festival (AFFF). It showed a wide array of international genre films, not just horror but also science fiction, fantasy, martial arts and anime.

In 2004, the festival hosted the Golden Méliès Gala, awarding the best fantastic European films, in both, features and shorts categories.

In 2009, the festival got a new name: Imagine Film Festival. The name change reflected the festival's evolving focus on films that could not be strictly classified as fantasy, horror or science fiction.

In 2013, after many years based at the Kriterion, the festival chose the Eye Film Institute as its home base. During the years at Eye, the festival started adding VR experiences as well as games, under the flag of "Imagine Expanded", and extended its science programme.

In 2022, both the timing and the venues were changed: to the end of October instead of mid-April, and at two new base venues.

== Overview ==
Imagine takes place at the end of October, at LAB111 and De FilmHallen.

The festival aims to acquaint both film lovers and the general public with a selection of new and classic films from genres such as fantasy, horror and science fiction. A large part of the program consists of genre films, exploitation films, cult films and obscure films, though the offerings have become increasingly diverse over the years.

The event is organized by the non-profit Foundation AFFF, with support from the Netherlands Film Fund and the City of Amsterdam.

== Awards ==
The festival awards the following prizes:

- Sea Devil Award, for best fantastic feature film
- Silver Méliès, for best fantastic European film; one for features and one for shorts
- Silver Scream Award, voted by the audience, all feature films (except classics) eligible

Former awards include the Imagine Time Capsule (2010–2015), the Black Tulip Award, and the VR Award.

=== Sea Devil Award ===
Formerly Black Tulip Award. In 2006, the jury prize was awarded in three categories but afterwards only in the category of best feature:

Category	Film title	Director
Best Feature 2026	The Wig	Emiliano Rocha Minter
Best Feature 2025	Mārama	Taratoa Stappard
Best Feature 2024	Rita	Jayro Bustamante
Best Feature 2023	Tiger Stripes	Amanda Nell Eu
Best Feature 2022	Ashkal	Youssef Chebbie
as Black Tulip Award
Best Feature 2021	History of the Occult	Cristian Ponce
Best Feature 2020	The Mortuary Collection	Ryan Spindell
Best Feature 2019	The Father's Shadow	Gabriela Amaral Almeida
Best Feature 2018	Tigers Are Not Afraid	Issa López
Best Feature 2017	Are We Not Cats	Xander Robin
Best Feature 2016	Into the Forest	Patricia Rozema
Best Feature 2015	Sunrise	Partho Sen-Gupta
Best Feature 2014	Coherence	James Ward Byrkit
Best Feature 2013	Wolf Children	Mamoru Hosoda
Best Feature 2012	Eddie: The Sleepwalking Cannibal	Boris Rodriguez
Best Feature 2011	Bedevilled	Jang Cheol-soo
Best Feature 2010	The Seventh Circle	Arpad Sopsits
Best Feature 2009	Let the Right One In	Tomas Alfredson
Best Feature 2008	Timecrimes	Nacho Vigalondo
Best Feature 2007	The Bothersome Man	Jens Lien
Best Feature 2006	Next Door	Pål Sletaune
Best Feature Debut 2006	MirrorMask	Dave McKean & Neil Gaiman
Best Short 2006	Doll Nr. 639	András Dési & Gábor Móray

=== Méliès Awards ===
The Méliès Awards are an initiative of the Méliès International Festivals Federation (formerly European Fantastic Film Festivals Federation), of which Imagine has been a member since 1996. Affiliated festivals award two Silver Méliès Awards each year during their respective festivals: one for Best Fantastic Feature and one for Best Fantastic Short. The winners then join the Méliès d'Or Award ceremony.

Amsterdam Silver Méliès winners

Year	Film title	Director
2026	Salvation	Emin Alper
2025	The Last Viking	Anders Thomas Jensen
2024	Mr. K	Tallulah H. Schwab
2023	Infested	Sébastien Vanícek
2022	Attachment	Gabriel Bier Gislason
2021	Censor	Prano Bailey-Bond
2020	Dogs Don’t Wear Pants	Jukka-Pekka Valkeapää
2019	O Beautiful Night	Xaver Xylophon
2018	The Place	Paolo Genovese
2017	Skins	Eduardo Casanova
2016	The Survivalist	Stephen Fingleton
2015	Liza, the Fox-Fairy	Károly Ujj Mészáros
2014	The Samurai	Till Kleinert
2013	The End	Jorge Torregrossa
2012	Sleep Tight	Jaume Balagueró
2011	Suiker	Jeroen Annokkeé
2010	Transmission	Roland Vranik
2009	Before the Fall	F. Javier Gutiérrez
2008	The King of the Mountain	Gonzalo López-Gallego
2007	Them	David Moreau & Xavier Palud
2006	Storm	Måns Mårlind & Björn Stein
2005	Calvaire	Fabrice du Welz
2004	The Green Butchers	Anders Thomas Jensen
2003	My Little Eye	Marc Evans
2002	The Devil's Backbone	Guillermo del Toro
2001	Heart of the Warrior	Daniel Monzón

=== Silver Scream Award ===
The Silver Scream Award is voted by the audience of the festival.

Year	Film title	Director
2026	5 More Minutes	Javier Ruiz Caldera
2025	The Last Viking	Anders Thomas Jensen
2024	Anora	Sean Baker
2023	The Boy and the Heron	Hayao Miyazaki
2022	Escape to the Silver Globe	Kuba Mikurda
2021	Alien on Stage	Lucy Harvey & Dannielle Kummer
2019	One Cut of the Dead	Shinchiro Ueda
2018	Isle of Dogs	Wes Anderson
2017	Get Out	Jordan Peele
2016	They Call Me Jeeg	Gabriele Mainetti
2015	Ex Machina	Alex Garland
2014	Jodorowsky's Dune	Frank Pavich
2013	The Battery	Jeremy Gardner
2012	The Raid	Gareth Evans
2011	The Perfect Host	Nicholas Tomnay
2010	Mary and Max	Adam Elliot
2009	Let the Right One In	Tomas Alfredson
2008	REC	Jaume Balagueró & Paco Plaza
2007	Adam's Apples	Anders Thomas Jensen
2006	Ordinary Man	Vincent Lannoo
2005	Kung Fu Hustle	Stephen Chow
2004	Tempus Fugit	Enric Folch
2003	Spirited Away	Hayao Miyazaki
2002	Donnie Darko	Richard Kelly
2001	Heart of the Warrior	Daniel Monzón
2000	Galaxy Quest	Dean Parisot
1999	eXistenZ	David Cronenberg
1998	Dark City	Alex Proyas
1996	From Dusk till Dawn	Robert Rodriguez
1995	Dellamorte Dellamore	Michele Soavi
1994	Return of the Living Dead 3	Brian Yuzna
1993	Braindead	Peter Jackson
1992	Akira	Katsuhiro Otomo
1991	The Silence of the Lambs	Jonathan Demme
1990	Nightbreed	Clive Barker

=== VR Award ===
In 2018, the inaugural VR Award was awarded to an eight-channel video Australian work called The Summation of Force, by filmmaker Matthew Bate and photographers Narelle Autio and Trent Parke.

=== Lifetime / Career Achievement Award ===
The Lifetime / Career Achievement Award has been awarded to the following people:

- 2026 - Kiyoshi Kurosawa (Career Achievement Award)
- 2025 - Ben Wheatley (Career Achievement Award)
- 2024 - Phil Tippett (Career Achievement Award)
- 2019 - William Lustig (Career Achievement Award)
- 2014 - Alejandro Jodorowsky (Career Achievement Award)
- 2013 - Neil Jordan
- 2012 - Stan Lee
- 2011 - Rutger Hauer
- 2010 - Dick Maas
- 2008 - Tim Burton (Career Achievement Award)
- 2007 - Terry Gilliam (Career Achievement Award)
- 2006 - Roger Corman
- 2005 - Ray Harryhausen
- 2005 - Paul Naschy
- 2004 - not awarded
- 2003 - Lloyd Kaufman
- 2002 - Paul Verhoeven
- 2001 - Dario Argento
- 2000 - Wes Craven

=== Imagine Time Capsule ===
This prize was awarded for online entries between 2010 and 2015:

Year	Film title	Director
2015	We Love Robots	Bram Roza & Jurriaan Verdoold
2014	Looking for Laika	Thijs Molenaar & Laurens Roorda
2013	Monsterpop	Boriz Baatsen
2012	Mayan Prophecy	Geoffrey Cramm
2011	Under the Dress	Sasha Meijer
2010	The Vegan Vampire	Suzi Terror
