= Méliès d'Or =

- Awarded for: Best works of speculative fiction
- Presented by: Méliès International Festivals Federation
- First award: 1996
- Currently held by: Mr. K (2025)
- Website: melies.org

The Méliès d'Or (French pronunciation: [meljɛs dɔʁ]; English: Golden Méliès) is an award presented annually by the Méliès International Festivals Federation (MIFF), an international network of genre film festivals from Europe. The Méliès d'Or was introduced in 1996 for science fiction, fantasy, and horror films. The award is named after film director Georges Méliès.

Spanish filmmaker Álex de la Iglesia and Danish filmmaker Anders Thomas Jensen are the only directors to have won the award twice. The most awarded country overall is Spain with seven awards, followed by Denmark and the United Kingdom with four awards each.

== Winners ==
Year	English title	Original title	Director(s)	Country	Ref.
1990s
1996	The Day of the Beast	El día de la bestia	Álex de la Iglesia	Spain	
1997	Train of Shadows	Tren de sombras	José Luis Guerín	Spain	
1998	Photographing Fairies		Nick Willing	United Kingdom	
1999	The Nameless	Los sin nombre	Jaume Balagueró	Spain	
2000s
2000	Possessed	Besat	Anders Rønnow Klarlund	Denmark	
2001	Thomas in Love	Thomas est amoureux	Pierre-Paul Renders	Belgium	
2002	Fausto 5.0		Àlex Ollé, Isidro Ortiz, Carlos Padrisa	Spain	
2003	The Green Butchers	De grønne slagtere	Anders Thomas Jensen	Denmark	
2004	Code 46		Michael Winterbottom	United Kingdom	
2006	Adam's Apples	Adams Æbler	Anders Thomas Jensen	Denmark	
2007	Princess		Anders Morgenthaler	Denmark	
2008	Let the Right One In	Låt den rätte komma in	Tomas Alfredson	Sweden	
2009	Martyrs		Pascal Laugier	France	
2010s
2010	Buried		Rodrigo Cortés	Spain	
2011	The Last Circus	Balada triste de trompeta	Álex de la Iglesia	Spain	
2012	Vanishing Waves	Aurora	Kristina Buožytė	Lithuania	
2013	In the Name of the Son	Au nom du fils	Vincent Lannoo	Belgium	
2014	Alleluia		Fabrice Du Welz	Belgium	
2015	Goodnight Mommy	Ich seh, Ich seh	Veronika Franz and Severin Fiala	Austria	
2016	Raw	Grave	Julia Ducournau	France	
2017	Thelma		Joachim Trier	Norway	
2018	Climax		Gaspar Noé	France	
2019	In Fabric		Peter Strickland	United Kingdom	
2020s
2020	Pelican Blood	Pelikanblut	Katrin Gebbe	Germany	
2021	Censor		Prano Bailey-Bond	United Kingdom	
2022	Piggy	Cerdita	Carlota Pereda	Spain	
2023	LOLA		Andrew Legge	Ireland	
2024	Handling the Undead	Håndtering av udøde	Thea Hvistendahl	Norway	
2025	Mr. K		Tallulah H. Schwab	Norway; Netherlands; Belgium	
2026	Feels Like Home	Itt érzem magam otthon	Gábor Holtai	Hungary	

== See also ==
- Speculative fiction
- List of fantasy awards
