= In a Better World =

2010 film

- Theatrical release poster
- Directed by: Susanne Bier
- Written by: Susanne Bier; Anders Thomas Jensen
- Produced by: Sisse Graum Jørgensen
- Starring: Mikael Persbrandt; Trine Dyrholm; Ulrich Thomsen; Markus Rygaard; William Jøhnk Juels Nielsen
- Cinematography: Morten Søborg
- Edited by: Pernille Bech Christensen; Morten Egholm
- Music by: Johan Söderqvist
- Production company: Zentropa
- Distributed by: Nordisk Film
- Release date: 26 August 2010
- Running time: 118 minutes
- Countries: Denmark; Sweden
- Languages: Danish; Swedish; English; Arabic
- Budget: US$5.5 million
- Box office: Worldwide: US$13,004,504

In a Better World (Danish: Hævnen, "The Revenge") is a 2010 thriller tragedy film written by Anders Thomas Jensen and directed by Susanne Bier. The film stars Mikael Persbrandt, Trine Dyrholm, and Ulrich Thomsen in a story which takes place in small-town Denmark and a refugee camp in Africa.

A Danish majority production with co-producers in Sweden, In a Better World won the 2011 Golden Globe Award for Best Foreign Language Film as well as the award for Best Foreign Language Film at the 83rd Academy Awards. The film also won European Film Awards for Best Director, in addition to receiving nominations for Best Film. Persbrandt also was nominated for Best Actor.

== Plot ==
Anton (Mikael Persbrandt) is a Swedish doctor who commutes between his home in Denmark and his work in a Sudanese refugee camp. In Sudan, he often treats female patients who are the victims of a sadistic warlord. Anton is married to Marianne (Trine Dyrholm), but they are separated, and struggling with the possibility of divorce over an affair that Anton had with another woman. They have two young sons, the older one being 12-year-old Elias (Markus Rygaard).

Christian (William Jøhnk Juels Nielsen), who has just moved from London with his father, Claus (Ulrich Thomsen), is a new boy at Elias' school. Christian's mother recently died from cancer, and Christian blames his father for lying to him that she would get well, and that, in a late stage of her disease, he "wanted" her to die. Elias is bullied at school, until he is defended by Christian, who assaults the main bully and threatens him with a knife. Christian gives Elias the knife, and both boys lie to the police, and their parents, about the incident.

When Anton separates his younger son from another child, while they are fighting at a playground, the father of the other child, a mechanic, tells Anton not to touch his child and slaps Anton in the face. Anton later visits the mechanic at his work, accompanied by his children and Christian, to discuss the matter, and to show the children that he is not afraid of the man. The boorish and xenophobic mechanic insults Anton's nationality and slaps him several more times, but Anton does not flinch from the blows.

Later, in Sudan, the psychopathic warlord comes to Anton's hospital for treatment of his wounded leg. To the horror of his staff and others, and acting at the expense of his own moral convictions, Anton treats the man. He does demand, however, that no weapons, and only two of his guards, be allowed inside the hospital. The warlord's leg seems to slowly heal and Anton barely tolerates his presence in the camp, but after the warlord shows contempt for one of his victims, Anton drags him away from the clinic, allowing him to be beaten to death by local people.

In Denmark, Christian and Elias decide to make a bomb to destroy the mechanic's car, on a Sunday morning so that no passers-by might be hurt. With the fuse already burning, they see two joggers approaching (a mother and her young daughter), and Elias leaves his protected position to warn them. He is knocked unconscious, but saves the joggers from harm. Christian is questioned by the police and then released, with the incident being addressed as an extreme case of vandalism. He goes to the hospital to visit Elias, but Marianne does not let him see the boy, instead telling him that he has killed her son. Christian, believing that Elias is dead, climbs to the roof of a silo, contemplating suicide, but is rescued by Anton. Christian is relieved that Elias is doing well, and he is now allowed to visit him.

Christian is reconciled with his father, and Anton and Marianne have sex, apparently resuming their marriage.

== Cast ==
- Mikael Persbrandt as Anton
- Trine Dyrholm as Marianne
- Ulrich Thomsen as Claus
- William Jøhnk Juels Nielsen as Christian
- Markus Rygaard as Elias
- Simon Maagaard Holm as Sofus
- Kim Bodnia as Lars
- Wil Johnson as doctor
- Eddie Kimani as doctor
- Emily Mglaya as nurse
- Gabriel Muli as interpreter
- June Waweru as Nurse
- Mary Hounu Moat as patient
- Synah Saeedi as old lady
- Elsebeth Steentoft as Signe
- Satu Helena Mikkelinen as Hanna
- Camilla Gottlieb as Eva
- Birthe Neumann as Marianne's colleague
- Paw Henriksen as policeman
- Jesper Lohmann as policeman
- Bodil Jørgensen as head teacher
- Lars Kaalund as Lars' colleague
- Lars Bom as investigator

== Production ==
The idea for the film originated when Bier and screenwriter Anders Thomas Jensen had discussions about the perception of Denmark as a very harmonious society. They then wanted to write a story where dramatic turns of events would disrupt the image of a place perceived as blissful. The development of the narrative started with the character that would be played by Mikael Persbrandt, and the idea of an idealist who becomes the victim of an assault. The two writers had no specific actors in mind while developing the story but rewrote details when the leads had been cast.

The film was produced by Denmark's Zentropa in co-production with DR2 and Sweden's Memfis Film, Sveriges Television, Trollhättan Film and Film i Väst. It received seven million Danish kroner from the Danish Film Institute as well as funding from the Swedish Film Institute, the pan-Nordic Nordisk Film- & TV-Fond and the European Union's MEDIA Programme. Filming started at the end of August 2009 and took place on the island of Langeland and in Kenya.

== Themes ==
Director Susanne Bier said: "Our experiment in this film is about looking at how little it really takes before a child – or an adult – thinks something is deeply unjust. It really doesn't take much, and I find that profoundly interesting. And scary."

== Reception ==
=== Critical response ===
Review aggregator Rotten Tomatoes reports that 78% out of 122 professional critics gave the film a positive review, and an average rating of 7.11/10, with the site consensus stating that "In a Better World is a sumptuous melodrama that tackles some rather difficult existential and human themes." On Metacritic the film has a score of 65 out of 100 based on reviews from 29 critics, indicating "generally favorable reviews".

Kim Skotte called the film a "powerful and captivating drama" in Politiken. Out of the four collaborations between Jensen and Bier, he considered In a Better World to be the one most similar to Jensen's solo films and compared the combination of biblical themes and high entertainment value to Jensen's 2005 film Adam's Apples. Skotte also praised the acting performances: "Mighty Mikael Persbrandt shows that he is Scandinavia's most charismatic actor right now. Trine Dyrholm's scenes are fewer, but in a split second she can dramatise the canvas to make the throat lace itself. Also Ulrich Thomsen is good as grief-stricken single father. With her successful directing of the two boys Markus Rygaard and William Jøhnk Nielsen, Bier adds a new chapter to her already extensive resumé of top tuned skills."

Peter Nielsen of Dagbladet Information called In a Better World "in all ways a successful film", and although there "is no doubt that Susanne Bier can tell a good story", he was not entirely convinced: "She can seduce, and she can push the completely correct emotional buttons, so that mothers' as well as fathers' hearts are struck, but she doesn't earnestly drill her probe into the meat."

Roger Ebert rated the film 2½ stars out of 4, writing that while he admired Bier's previous films Things We Lost in the Fire and both the Danish and American versions of Brothers, he felt that "here her method is too foregrounded. The African events in particular don't fit organically into the rest of the film, playing more like a contrived contrast." However, he also remarked, "The story of the boys works well (they're both good actors), and their fathers are well-drawn and seen with sympathy .... There are two strong stories here, in Africa and Denmark. Either could have made a film. Intercut in this way, they seem too much like self-conscious parables. No doubt the film's noble intentions appealed to the academy voters, but this seems to me the weakest of this year's five nominees."

=== Accolades ===
On 19 January 2011, it made the shortlist for Best Foreign Language Film and on 25 January, it was selected as one of the final five nominees and won as the Danish entry for the Best Foreign Language Film at the 83rd Academy Awards. The film also won for Best Foreign Language Film at the 68th Golden Globe Awards. Additionally, it won:

- Rome International Film Festival 2010:
  - Marc'Aurelio Audience Award for Best Film
  - Marc'Aurelio Grand Jury Award
- Sevilla Festival de Cine 2010:
  - Best Director
  - Best Screenplay
- Tallinn Tarta, Black Nights Film Festival 2010:
  - Best Male Actor
- Thessaloniki International Film Festival 2010:
  - Creative Excellence Award
- European Film Awards
  - Best Director

== See also ==
- List of submissions to the 83rd Academy Awards for Best Foreign Language Film
- List of Danish submissions for the Academy Award for Best International Feature Film
