= Line Kruse (actress) =

Danish actress (born 1975)

Line Kruse (born 3 August 1975) is a Danish actress. She is best known for her role in the Krummerne series of films (1991–1994).

== Early life and education ==
Line Kruse was born on 3 August 1975 in Frederiksværk, Denmark.

After acting in several films, she undertook the four-year acting course at Aarhus Theatre Acting School in Aarhus, graduating in 2000.

== Career ==
=== Screen ===
Kruse made her feature film debut in the role of Emma in Skyggen af Emma (Emma's Shadow), released in 1988. She became more widely known when she was cast as Krumme's sister Stine in the Krummerne series of films (1991, 1992, 1994).

Later, after graduating from drama school, she played Tanja in Et rigtigt menneske (A Real Man; 2001). In 2003, she played a lead role in The Green Butchers (De grønne slagtere), which was written and directed by her future husband, Anders Thomas Jensen. Among other films, she had roles in Clash of Egos (Sprængfarlig bombe, 2006); A Family (2010); Love Is All You Need (Den skaldede frisør, lit. "The Bald Hairdresser"; 2012); Fædre og Mødre (Fathers and Mothers, 2022, directed by Paprika Steen); and Fuld af kærlighed (Full of love, 2024).

On television, she played herself in two episodes of Russian Pizza Blues in 1995, and played Cookie in Skjulte spor (2000-2003). More recent roles include as Kristina in Follow the Money (Bedrag; 2016-2019) and Karen in Cry Wolf (Ulven kommer, 2024).

She plays Mother in Bryan Fuller's 2025 children's horror film Dust Bunny, with Mads Mikkelsen and Sigourney Weaver, and also had the role of acting coach for child actress Sophie Sloan in the film.

=== Stage ===
In 1998 she played Janni in Dengse og Mørket, and in 2001 in Den luft andre indånder at Mungo Park Theatre. She also had roles in Knivskarpe polaroider (based on Some Explicit Polaroids, by British playwright Mark Ravenhill) at Café Teatret in Copenhagen 2000, and in Glasmenageriet (The Glass Menagerie, by Tennessee Williams) at the Royal Theatre in 2001.

== Other activities ==
Line participated in Season 11 of Vild med dans (part of the Dancing with the Stars franchise) in 2014, partnered with Michael Olesen, but was eliminated in the 5th round.

== Personal life ==
Line married filmmaker Anders Thomas Jensen in 2008.
