= Mads Mikkelsen =

Danish actor (born 1965)

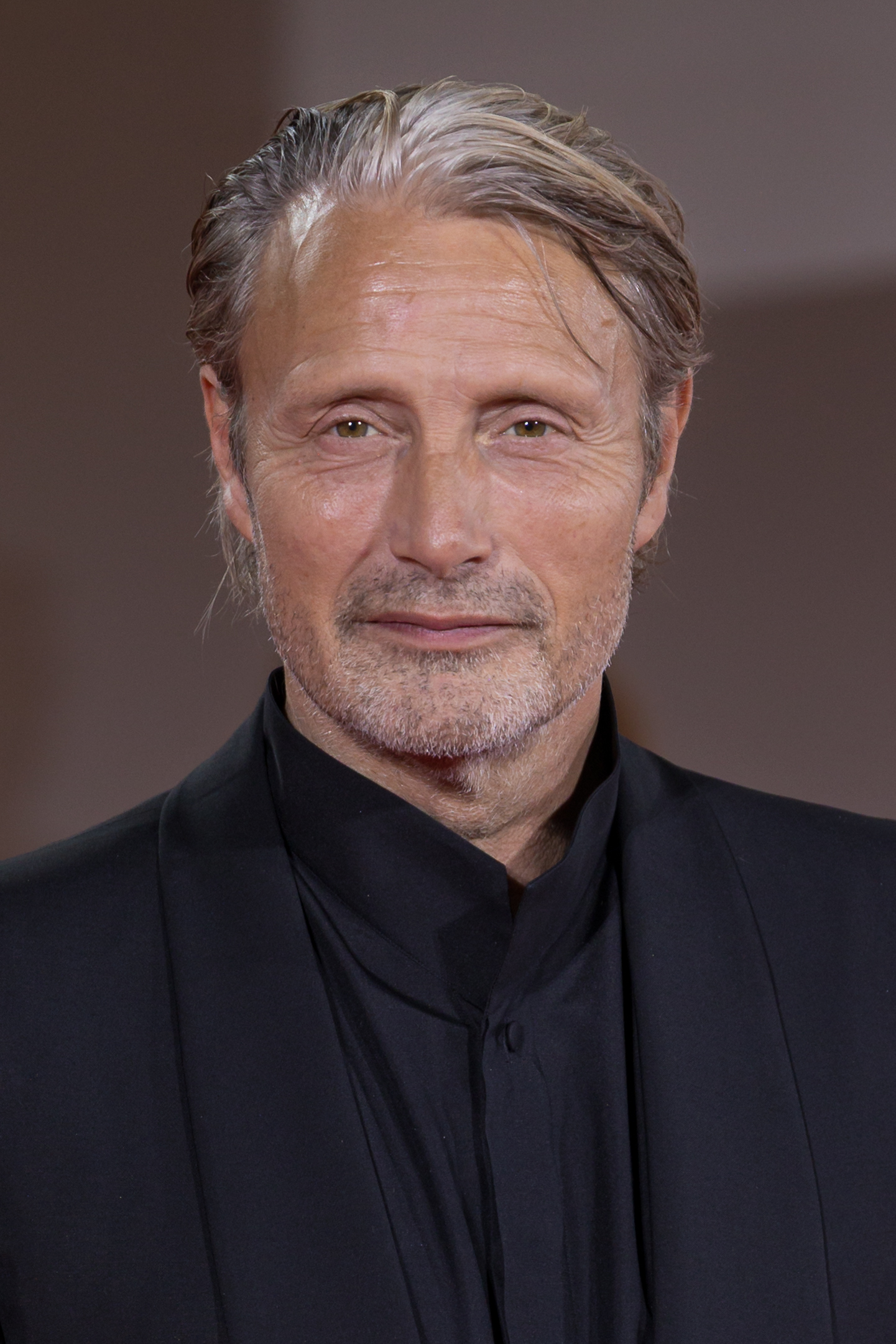
- Mikkelsen in 2025
- Born: Mads Dittmann Mikkelsen; 22 November 1965 (age 60); Copenhagen, Denmark
- Occupation: Actor
- Years active: 1996–present
- Spouse: Hanne Jacobsen (m. 2000)
- Children: 2
- Relatives: Lars Mikkelsen (brother)
- Honours: Knight of the Order of the Dannebrog; Knight of the Order of the Arts and Letters

Mads Dittmann Mikkelsen (Danish: [ˈmæs ditsʰmɛːn ˈme̝kl̩sn̩]; born 22 November 1965) is a Danish actor. He rose to fame in Denmark as an actor for his roles such as Tonny in the first two films of the Pusher film trilogy (1996, 2004), Detective Sergeant Allan Fischer in the television series Rejseholdet (2000–2004), Niels in Open Hearts (2002), Svend in The Green Butchers (2003), Ivan in Adam's Apples (2005) and Jacob Petersen in After the Wedding (2006).

Mikkelsen achieved worldwide recognition for playing the main antagonist Le Chiffre in the twenty-first James Bond film, Casino Royale (2006). This recognition led to him featuring in Hollywood blockbuster films, such as Clash of the Titans (2010), Marvel's Doctor Strange (2016), Lucasfilm's Rogue One (2016), Fantastic Beasts: The Secrets of Dumbledore (2022), and Indiana Jones and the Dial of Destiny (2023). Further prominent leading roles include Igor Stravinsky in Coco Chanel & Igor Stravinsky (2008), One-Eye in Valhalla Rising (2009), Johann Friedrich Struensee in A Royal Affair (2012), his Cannes Film Festival Best Actor Award-winning performance as Lucas in The Hunt (2012), his BAFTA-nominated role as Martin in Another Round (2020), Markus Hansen in Riders of Justice (2020), and Captain Ludwig Kahlen in The Promised Land (2023). Outside of film, he is known for his roles as Dr. Hannibal Lecter in the television series Hannibal (2013–2015), Cliff Unger in Hideo Kojima's video game Death Stranding (2019) and the villainous individual known as "The Archer" in Call of Duty: Modern Warfare 4 (2026).

A. O. Scott of The New York Times remarked that in the Hollywood scene, Mikkelsen has "become a reliable character actor with an intriguing mug" but stated that on the domestic front "he is something else: a star, an axiom, a face of the resurgent Danish cinema".

== Early life ==
Mikkelsen was born on 22 November 1965 in the Østerbro district of Copenhagen, Denmark, the son of mother Bente (née Christiansen) Mikkelsen and father Henning Dittmann Mikkelsen, a cab driver. He and his older brother, actor Lars Mikkelsen, were raised in the Nørrebro district.

In his youth, he trained as a gymnast, wanting to pursue athletics, but then studied dancing at Balettakademien ('The Ballet Academy') in Gothenburg where he also became fluent in Swedish. During his dancing career, Mikkelsen met choreographer Hanne Jacobsen, whom he married in 2000. He was a professional dancer for almost a decade until he left it behind to study drama at the Århus Theatre School in 1996, embarking on a career in acting.

== Career ==
=== 1996–2005 ===
Mikkelsen made his film debut in 1996 as a drug dealer in Nicolas Winding Refn's internationally successful film Pusher, which spawned two sequels. He played marginalized, often comic roles in popular Danish films. In 1999, Mikkelsen had a leading role as Lenny, a shy film expert who has avoidant personality disorder, opposite Kim Bodnia in Refn's Bleeder (1999). In 2000, Mikkelsen played a gangster opposite Søren Pilmark, Ulrich Thomsen and Nikolaj Lie Kaas in Anders Thomas Jensen's Copenhagen gangster film, Flickering Lights. The following year, he gained wider popularity when he starred in the gay comedy Shake It All About (2001).

In 2002, Mikkelsen had a starring role as a young doctor who falls in love with the girlfriend of one of his patients in Open Hearts which earned him both Robert and Bodil nominations in 2003 for best actor. He also won best actor for this performance at the Rouen Nordic Film Festival in 2003. In 2003, Mikkelsen had a leading role as a man who leaves his wife and child in the short film Nu. He starred opposite Kaas in The Green Butchers, playing an orphaned butcher's assistant in a small provincial Danish town, where human meat is a specialty. He won the Fantasporto Award for Best Actor for his portrayal of the butcher. Later in 2003, he starred in Pablo Berger's Spanish film Torremolinos 73, about an exasperated encyclopedia salesman who exports pornographic films to Scandinavian countries under the pretense of being an audiovisual encyclopedia of human reproduction. Although a critical success in Spain, the film was poorly received in Scandinavian countries.

In 2004, Mikkelsen reprised his role as drug dealer Tonny in the Pusher sequel, Pusher II. His performance was acclaimed, garnering him the Bodil Award for Best Actor, Zulu Award for Best Actor and Robert Festival Award for Best Actor. One writer likened his pose in the mirror in the film to Robert De Niro in Martin Scorsese's Taxi Driver. In 2005, Mikkelsen portrayed an "unorthodox country vicar" named Ivan who challenges a neo-Nazi (Ulrich Thomsen) who has been sentenced to community service to bake an apple pie in Adam's Apples.

Mikkelsen's breakthrough and his longest running role was as a sensitive policeman in Niels Arden Oplev's Danish television series Rejseholdet (Unit One) (2000–03), for which he won the 2002 Best Actor Award from TvFestival.dk. The series' 32 episodes stretched over four years. He became more widely known internationally for his role as Tristan in Jerry Bruckheimer's production of the movie King Arthur (2004), which was a commercial success despite negative reviews.

=== 2006–2010 ===
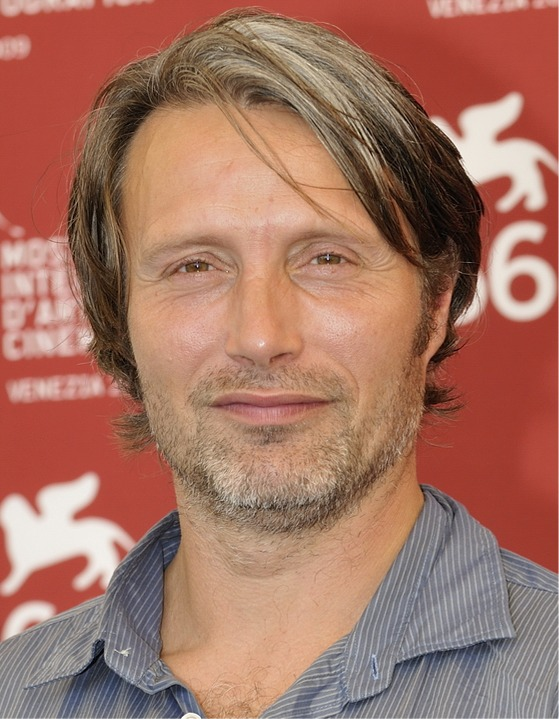
Mikkelsen at the 2009 Venice Film Festival

In 2006, Mikkelsen starred opposite Stine Stengade and Jana Plodková in Ole Christian Madsen's award-winning film Prag (Prague). His role as Christoffer earned him the Zulu Award for Best Actor and Bodil and Robert Festival nominations for Best Actor. Eddie Cockrell of Variety noted his "rigid countenance" in an "outstanding" performance. The same year, Mikkelsen achieved his first widely acclaimed international success as Le Chiffre in the twenty-first James Bond film, Casino Royale. Mikkelsen has said that he so easily won the part that even Daniel Craig asked him if he had slept with someone to be cast. He said of the casting, "They'd done their homework, seen my stuff, so it was fine, just a bit of anti-climax, because I was so ready to do more for them, but it was ... shrugs... you're in." He also stated that because he was already a big film star in Denmark at the time, that the international role did not really change much. Roger Ebert noted the suspense during Mikkelsen's scene with Bond during the extended poker game, in which Le Chiffre weeps blood from his left eye. David Edelstein of New York Magazine said "Mikkelsen clicks his rectangular plaques as if he's a new breed of praying mantis. He's bloodcurdling." In 2006, Mikkelsen also took the lead role in the Danish drama After the Wedding, which earned an Academy Award nomination for Best Foreign Film. Additionally, he won a European Film Award for Best Actor nomination for his performance and in 2007, won the Palm Springs International Film Festival Award for Best Actor. The New York Times remarked that on the Hollywood scene, Mikkelsen has "become a reliable character actor with an intriguing mug" but stated that on the domestic front "he is something else: a star, an axiom, a face of the resurgent Danish cinema."

In 2008, Mikkelsen portrayed Danish resistance fighter Jørgen Haagen Schmith opposite Thure Lindhardt and Stine Stengade in Ole Christian Madsen's Flame & Citron (Flammen & Citronen), a film which is loosely based on actual events involving two of the most active fighters in the Holger Danske resistance group during World War II. Mikkelsen's character nicknamed "Citronen" is named after a Citroën factory in which he works. Michael O' Sullivan of The Washington Post likened Mikkelsen and Lindhardt's characters to Butch Cassidy and the Sundance Kid and said that it is "the story of handsome rogues with guns. It's fast-paced, stylish and thrilling." In 2008, Mikkelsen also provided the voice for the character Le Chiffre in the Quantum of Solace video game, and he represented Le Chiffre when he was invited to the launch of Swiss watchmaker Swatch's "007 Villain Collection" in Bregenz, Austria. The following year, gaining a reputation as one of Europe's most sensuous male actors, Mikkelsen played a hot-blooded Stravinsky opposite Anna Mouglalis in Jan Kounen's critically acclaimed Coco Chanel & Igor Stravinsky based on the romance between the composer and the fashion designer. Empire magazine described it as a "visually stunning film [which] focuses on Chanel and Stravinsky's illicit relationship in 1920s France." Philip French of The Observer described the film as a "beautiful, intelligent, shallow film, like a pane of plate glass that at first glance looks like a deep lake", and remarked that Mikkelsen's Stravinsky matched Mouglalis's Coco Chanel as a "fellow modernist and equally cool egotist." Mikkelsen then returned to violent action, collaborating once again with Refn, playing a Norse warrior in the Crusades in Valhalla Rising (2009) and Draco, a self-sacrificing leader of the king's guard in Clash of the Titans (2010). Valhalla Rising was shot entirely in Scotland.

=== 2011–present ===
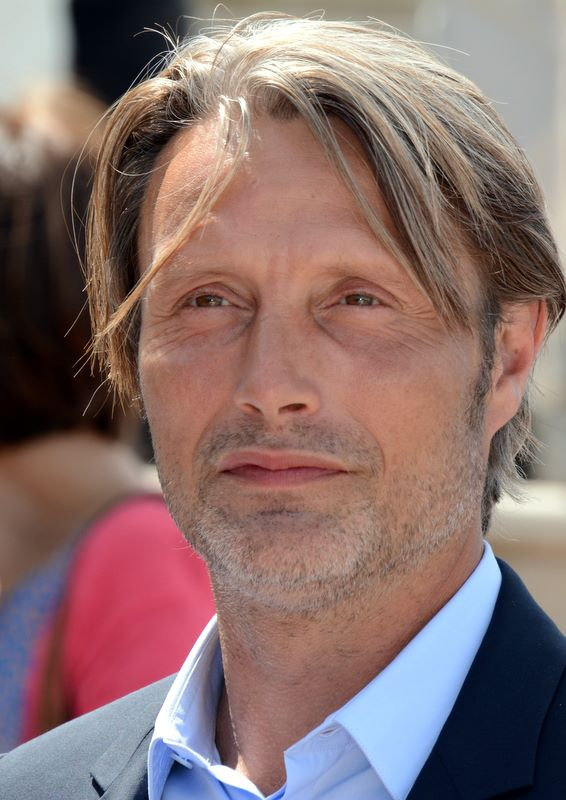
Mikkelsen at the 2013 Cannes Film Festival

In 2011, he played Comte de Rochefort in another box-office success, The Three Musketeers, which earned poor reviews from critics. In 2012, he starred in The Hunt, for which he won the Best Actor Award at the Cannes Film Festival. He played a schoolteacher wrongly accused of child molestation, earning nominations for the European Film Award for Best Actor and the London Film Critics Circle Award for Actor of the Year for his performance. The same year he starred in the Oscar-nominated historical drama A Royal Affair taking the role of the 18th century physician Johann Friedrich Struensee who had an affair with Queen Caroline Mathilda while treating the mentally ill Danish monarch, Christian VII. The movie was one of the highest budget Danish films of all time largely due to its extravagant costumes and was well received by critics. Mikkelsen said of his role, "I was surprised how emotional I got reading this, especially for a period drama. And it was full of dilemma – he's full of love for both the king and the queen, but then he remains political, starts spinning his tunnel vision, and all of a sudden he's doing the exact same things he hated all the other courtiers for doing, and I thought that was interesting, and very human." In 2012, he was also awarded the Danish American Society's Person of the Year.

Mikkelsen played Hannibal Lecter in NBC's TV series Hannibal (2013–15), alongside Hugh Dancy as Special Agent Will Graham. The series has been a critical success, with Mikkelsen's performance as Lecter earning praise. Mikkelsen was initially dubious about accepting the role, as he believed that Anthony Hopkins' portrayal of Lecter was "done to perfection". He said of his character, "He's not a classic psychopath or a classic serial killer. I believe that he's as close to Satan as can be – the fallen angel. He sees the beauty in death. And every day is a new day, full of opportunities."

In 2013, he appeared alongside Shia LaBeouf and Evan Rachel Wood in Charlie Countryman, which had its premiere at the Sundance Film Festival, and later that year played the title character in Michael Kohlhaas, which had its premiere at the 2013 Cannes Film Festival. In 2014, he starred in The Salvation, a Danish western. Mikkelsen appeared on Rihanna's music video for "Bitch Better Have My Money" as her accountant, the song's titular "bitch" who stole from her.

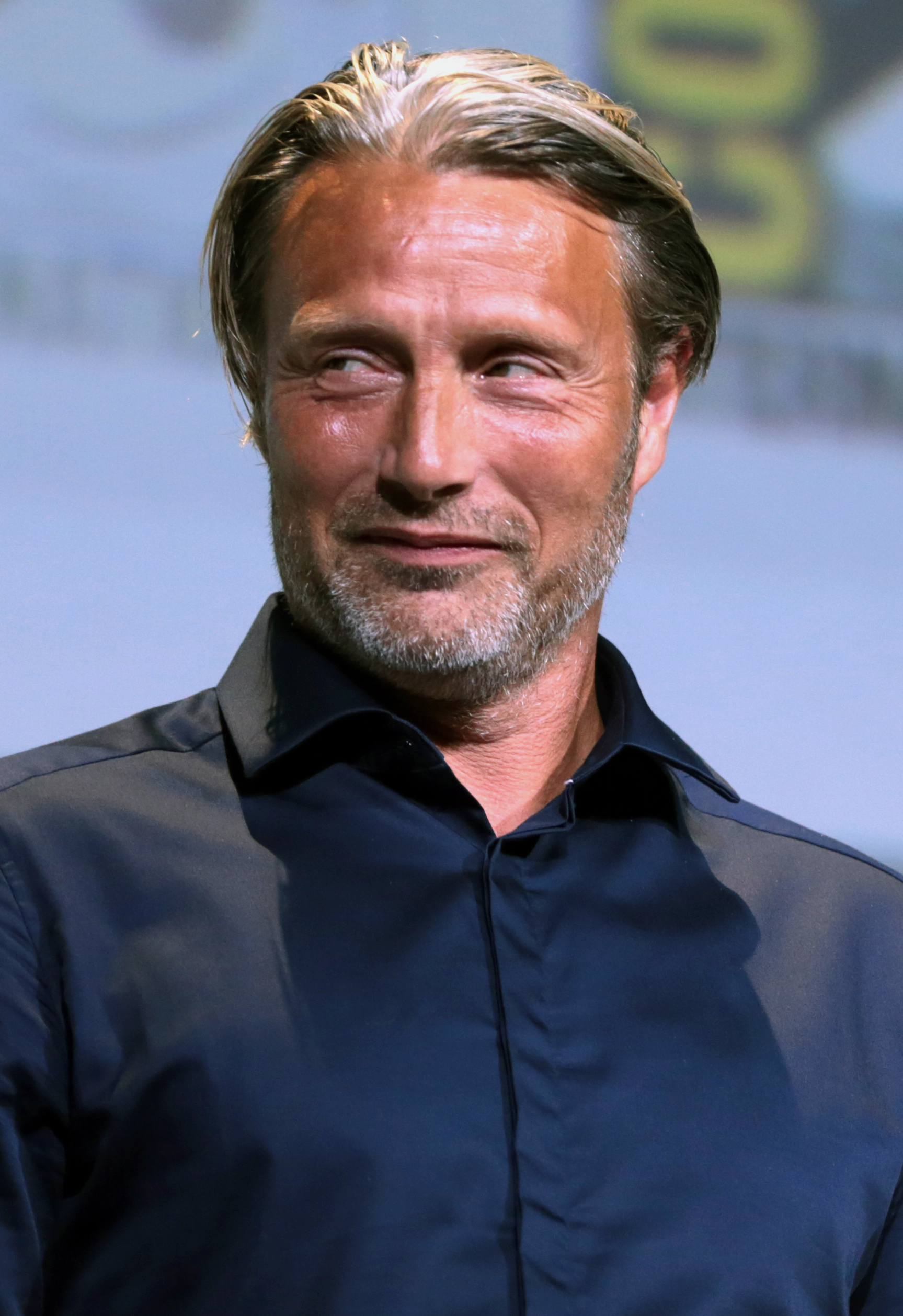
Mikkelsen at the 2016 San Diego Comic-Con

In 2016, Mikkelsen was a member of the main competition jury of the 2016 Cannes Film Festival. In October 2016, he joined the Marvel Cinematic Universe (MCU) as Kaecilius in the Marvel Studios film Doctor Strange, alongside Benedict Cumberbatch and Tilda Swinton. Although his character was criticized for being underused and another "generic baddie" for Marvel, Mikkelsen's performance was a favorite of Matt Zoller Seitz of RogerEbert.com: "Mikkelsen is a master at being in on the joke while still delivering every line with imagination and feeling.... he's often knowing and wry, even arch, a mix of performance traits that's often hard to combine with any success." In December 2016, Mikkelsen portrayed Galen Erso in the Star Wars spin-off film, Rogue One: A Star Wars Story. In 2018, he starred in a survival thriller Arctic, directed by the Brazilian filmmaker Joe Penna. He played the villainous mayor in Doug Liman's adapted science fiction film Chaos Walking, based on Patrick Ness' trilogy novels of the same name.

Mikkelsen starred in Hideo Kojima's video game Death Stranding. In 2018, he had a supporting role in Julian Schnabel's film At Eternity's Gate starring Willem Dafoe. In 2019, he starred in Jonas Åkerlund's action film Polar, which is based on Víctor Santos' graphic novel Polar: Came With the Cold. On Rotten Tomatoes it has an approval rating of 19% based on reviews from 47 critics.

Mikkelsen reunited with Thomas Vinterberg for the Danish comedy drama Another Round, which won the Academy Award for Best International Feature Film and earned Mikkelsen a BAFTA Nomination for Best Actor in a Leading Role.

In November 2020, Mikkelsen was revealed to be in early talks with Warner Bros. for the role of Gellert Grindelwald in the Fantastic Beasts series from Fantastic Beasts: The Secrets of Dumbledore, in which Warner Bros. asked Johnny Depp to step down after the latter lost in a defamation trial against News Group Newspapers. On 25 November, Warner Bros confirmed that Mikkelsen was cast as Grindelwald in the film.

In April 2021, Mikkelsen joined the cast of Indiana Jones and the Dial of Destiny.

He is also set to star in Amma Asante's Cold War thriller Billion Dollar Spy.

In May 2022, it was announced he would be reprising his role of Duncan Vizla in a new film titled The Black Kaiser, with Jonas Åkerlund returning to direct the film, which Mikkelsen had co-written. That same year, it was announced he would star in Nikolaj Arcel's new film The Promised Land which started shooting in September 2022.

He will reunite with Hannibal creator Bryan Fuller on his directorial debut Dust Bunny, with shooting to commence in 2023.

In late summer 2024, filming began on the Danish film The Last Viking, directed by Anders Thomas Jensen, with whom Mikkelsen has frequently collaborated. The actor plays the role of Manfred, the brother of the main character, portrayed by Nikolaj Lie Kaas.

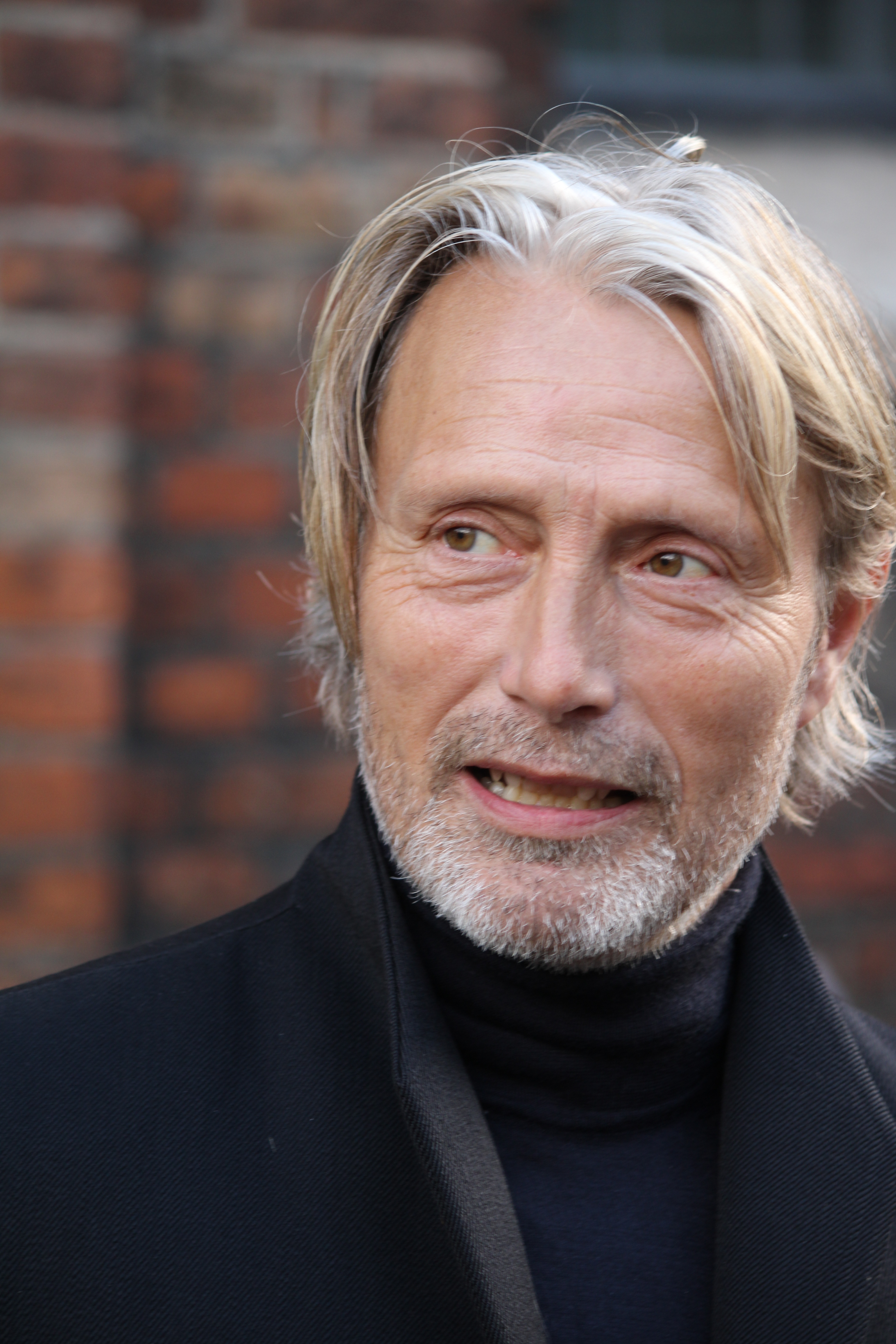
Mikkelsen at the funeral of Jørgen Leth at the Garrison Church in Copenhagen, 16 October 2025

In May 2025, Variety reported that Mikkelsen would voice the character Severin, the father of Kai, in the animated film North, based on Hans Christian Andersen's The Snow Queen. North is directed by fantasy filmmaker Bente Lone. Around the same time, it was announced that Mikkelsen would star in the prison drama Last Meals, which centers on a former White House chef who prepares final meals for death row inmates, and a prisoner (played by Boyd Holbrook) who decides to go on a hunger strike. Filming for Last Meals is set to begin in Ireland in 2025, with a script by Justin Piasecki (Relay) and direction by Ramin Bahrani.

It was also announced that Mikkelsen would appear in the directorial debut of Lee Smith, the Oscar-winning editor of Dunkirk and Inception. The Arctic action thriller Sirius is inspired by the Danish special forces unit known as the Sirius Patrol, tasked with guarding the 8,700-mile frozen and perilous coastline of Greenland.

In February 2026 Mikkelsen joined the cast of What Happens at Night directed by Martin Scorsese. Shooting has begun in Prague.

Mikkelsen starred in the first-person shooter video game Call of Duty: Modern Warfare 4 as the main antagonist dubbed "The Archer".

== Other activities ==
From 2017, Mikkelsen appeared in several Carlsberg's UK adverts. In 2025, he played a bartender in a commercial for Campari. Since 2023, he has been a brand ambassador for Italian luxury menswear brand Zegna.

== Personal life ==
In 2000, Mikkelsen married choreographer Hanne Jacobsen, whom he had been with since 1987. They have two children and two grandchildren.

Mikkelsen has lived in Copenhagen all his life, except when living in Toronto while filming Hannibal. He is based in Denmark and has a residence on the Spanish island of Mallorca, which he first visited in the late 1990s.

At the 2023 Bambi Awards in Munich, Mikkelsen dedicated his Bambi Award in the "Actor International" category to his granddaughter Maria. The Bambi, he noted, has the same name as the favourite film of his daughter, "and she has just given me a granddaughter".

In a 2024 interview, asked about his five favourite films of all time, Mikkelsen named Francis Ford Coppola's Apocalypse Now, Elem Klimov's Come and See, Krzysztof Kieślowski's Dekalog, Gene Kelly and Stanley Donen's Singin' in the Rain and Martin Scorsese's Taxi Driver.

== Honors ==
On 15 April 2010, Mikkelsen was appointed Ridder (Knight) of the Order of the Dannebrog. In April 2016, the French government appointed Mikkelsen a Chevalier (Knight) of the Ordre des Arts et des Lettres.

== Filmography ==
=== Film ===
Key
*	Denotes works that have not yet been released

Year	Title	Role	Director	Notes
1996	The Flower Prisoner	Max Åge	Jens Arentzen	Short film
1996	Pusher	Tonny	Nicolas Winding Refn	
1996	Café Hector	Anders	Lotte Svendsen	Short film
1997	The Caretaker	Alex	Stefano González	Short film
1998	Wildside	Jimmy	Simon Staho	
1998	Angels of the Night	Ronnie	Shaky González	
1999	Bleeder	Lenny	Nicolas Winding Refn (2)	
1999	Tom Merritt	Elmer Karr	Anders Gustafsson	Short film
2000	Flickering Lights	Arne	Anders Thomas Jensen	
2001	Mona's World	Casper	Jonas Elmer	
2001	Shake It All About	Jacob	Hella Joof	
2002	I Am Dina	Niels	Ole Bornedal	
2002	Open Hearts	Niels	Susanne Bier	
2002	Wilbur Wants to Kill Himself	Horst	Lone Scherfig	
2003	Now	Jakob (young)	Simon Staho (2)	Short film
2003	Boy Below	Father	Morten Giese	Short film
2003	The Green Butchers	Svend	Anders Thomas Jensen (2)	
2003	Torremolinos 73	Magnus	Pablo Berger	
2004	King Arthur	Tristan	Antoine Fuqua	
2004	Pusher II	Tonny	Nicolas Winding Refn (3)	
2005	Adam's Apples	Ivan	Anders Thomas Jensen (3)	
2006	After the Wedding	Jacob Pederson	Susanne Bier (2)	
2006	Prague	Christoffer	Ole Christian Madsen	
2006	Exit	Thomas Skepphult	Peter Lindmark	
2006	Casino Royale	Le Chiffre	Martin Campbell	
2008	Flame & Citron	Jørgen Haagen Schmith	Ole Christian Madsen (2)	
2009	Coco Chanel & Igor Stravinsky	Igor Stravinsky	Jan Kounen	
2009	Valhalla Rising	One Eye	Nicolas Winding Refn (4)	
2009	The Door	David	Anno Saul	
2010	Clash of the Titans	Draco	Louis Leterrier	
2010	Moomins and the Comet Chase	Sniff	Maria Lindberg	Voice
2011	The Three Musketeers	Comte de Rochefort	Paul W. S. Anderson	
2012	A Royal Affair	Johann Friedrich Struensee	Nikolaj Arcel	
2012	The Hunt	Lucas	Thomas Vinterberg	
2012	Move On	Mark	Asger Leth	
2013	Charlie Countryman	Nigel	Fredrik Bond	
2013	Age of Uprising: The Legend of Michael Kohlhaas	Michael Kohlhaas	Arnaud des Pallières	
2014	The Salvation	Jon Jensen	Kristian Levring	
2015	Men & Chicken	Elias	Anders Thomas Jensen (4)	
2016	Doctor Strange	Kaecilius	Scott Derrickson	
2016	The Phantom	The Phantom	Jake Scott	Short film
2016	Rogue One	Galen Erso	Gareth Edwards	
2018	Arctic	Overgård	Joe Penna	
2018	At Eternity's Gate	Priest	Julian Schnabel	
2019	Polar	Duncan Vizla	Jonas Åkerlund	
2020	Another Round	Martin	Thomas Vinterberg (2)	
2020	Riders of Justice	Markus	Anders Thomas Jensen (5)	
2021	Chaos Walking	Mayor David Prentiss	Doug Liman	
2021	Return of the Goat II: New World Order	Government Official	Otto Bathurst	Short film
2022	Fantastic Beasts: The Secrets of Dumbledore	Gellert Grindelwald	David Yates	
2023	Indiana Jones and the Dial of Destiny	Dr. Jürgen Voller	James Mangold	
2023	The Promised Land	Ludvig Kahlen	Nikolaj Arcel (2)	
2024	Mufasa: The Lion King	Kiros	Barry Jenkins	Voice
2025	North	Severin	Bente Lohne	Voice
2025	The Last Viking	Manfred	Anders Thomas Jensen (6)	
2025	Dust Bunny	Resident 5B	Bryan Fuller	
2027	A.M.I. †	Lt. Teague	Fernando Szurman	Post-production
2027	Sirius †	Jesper	Lee Smith	Post-production
TBA	What Happens at Night †	Brother Emmanuel	Martin Scorsese	Post-production

=== Television ===
Year	Title	Role	Notes
2000–2004	Rejseholdet	Allan Fischer	32 episodes
2005	Julie	Harald	6 episodes
2005	Klovn	Mads	Episode: "Str. 44"
2013–2015	Hannibal	Dr. Hannibal Lecter	39 episodes

=== Video games ===
Year	Title	Role	Notes
2008	007: Quantum of Solace	Le Chiffre	Voice
2019	Death Stranding	Clifford Unger	Voice and motion capture
2025	Hitman: World of Assassination	Le Chiffre	Voice and likeness; Elusive Target DLC
2026	Call of Duty: Modern Warfare 4	The Archer	Voice and motion capture

=== Music videos ===
Year	Artist	Title	Role
2009	Jokeren	"Sig Ja"	Male Lead
2011	Sólstafir	"Djákninn"	Viking Man
2015	Rihanna	"Bitch Better Have My Money"	The Accountant

== Awards and nominations ==
Year	Award	Title	Result
2001	Zulu Award for Best Actor	Shake It All About	Won
2002	Rouen Nordic Film Festival Award for Best Actor	Open Hearts	Won
2002	Bodil Award for Best Actor	Open Hearts	Nominated
2002	Robert Festival Award for Best Actor	Open Hearts	Nominated
2002	Zulu Award for Best Supporting Actor	Wilbur Wants to Kill Himself	Won
2003	Fantasporto Award for Best Actor	The Green Butchers	Won
2003	Bodil Award for Best Actor	The Green Butchers	Nominated
2004	Zulu Award for Best Actor	Pusher II	Won
2004	Bodil Award for Best Actor	Pusher II	Won
2004	Robert Festival Award for Best Actor	Pusher II	Won
2005	Puchon International Fantastic Film Festival Award for Best Actor	Adam's Apples	Won
2005	Robert Festival Award for Best Supporting Actor	Adam's Apples	Nominated
2006	European Film Award for Best Actor	After the Wedding	Nominated
2006	Robert Festival Award for Best Actor	After the Wedding	Nominated
2006	Zulu Award for Best Actor	Prague	Won
2006	Bodil Award for Best Actor	Prague	Nominated
2006	Robert Festival Award for Best Actor	Prague	Nominated
2007	FIPRESCI Prize for Best Actor	After the Wedding	Won
2008	European Film Award for Best Actor	Flame & Citron	Nominated
2008	Robert Festival Award for Best Supporting Actor	Flame & Citron	Nominated
2009	Robert Festival Award for Best Actor	Valhalla Rising	Nominated
2011	European Film Academy Achievement in World Cinema Award	N/A	Won
2012	Cannes Film Festival Award for Best Actor	The Hunt	Won
2012	Dublin Film Critics Circle Awards	The Hunt	Nominated
2012	European Film Award for Best Actor	The Hunt	Nominated
2012	London Film Critics Circle Award for Actor of the Year	The Hunt	Nominated
2012	Silver Medallion Award (Telluride Film Festival)	N/A	Won
2013	HFCS Award for Best Actor	The Hunt	Nominated
2013	IGN Summer Movie Award for Best TV Villain	Hannibal	Nominated
2013	INOCA TV Award for Best Supporting Actor in a Drama Series	Hannibal	Nominated
2013	ALFS Award for Actor of the Year	The Hunt	Nominated
2013	Online Film Critics Society Award for Best Actor	The Hunt	Nominated
2013	Robert Award for Best Actor in a Leading Role	A Royal Affair	Nominated
2013	Golden Space Needle Award for Best Actor	The Hunt	Nominated
2013	Zulu Award for Best Actor	The Hunt	Won
2014	Bodil Award for Best Actor in a Leading Role	The Hunt	Won
2014	Chlotrudis Award for Best Actor	The Hunt	Won
2014	CinEuphoria Award for Best Actor – International Competition	The Hunt	Won
2014	César Award for Best Actor	Age of Uprising: The Legend of Michael Kohlhaas	Nominated
2014	IGN Summer Movie Award for Best TV Villain	Hannibal	Won
2014	IGN People's Choice Award for Best TV Villain	Hannibal	Won
2014	International Cinephile Society Award for Best Actor	The Hunt	Nominated
2014	OFTA Television Award for Best Actor in a Drama Series	Hannibal	Nominated
2014	FIPRESCI Prize for Best Actor	The Hunt	Won
2014	Robert Award for Best Actor in a Leading Role	The Hunt	Won
2014	SESC Film Festival Audience Award for Best Foreign Actor	The Hunt	Won
2014	SESC Film Festival Critics Award for Best Foreign Actor	The Hunt	Won
2014	Saturn Award for Best Actor on Television	Hannibal	Won
2014	TV Guide Award for Favorite Villain	Hannibal	Nominated
2015	Fangoria Chainsaw Awards for Best TV Actor	Hannibal	Nominated
2015	Saturn Award for Best Actor on Television	Hannibal	Nominated
2015	Satellite Award for Best Actor – Television Series Drama	Hannibal	Nominated
2015	Zulu Award for Best Actor	Men & Chicken	Won
2015	Fangoria Chainsaw Awards for Best TV Actor	Hannibal	Nominated
2016	Robert Award for Best Actor in a Supporting Role	Men & Chicken	Nominated
2016	Russian National Movie Award for Best Foreign Villain of the Year	Hannibal	Nominated
2016	Saturn Award for Best Actor on Television	Hannibal	Nominated
2017	Kids' Choice Award for Best Performance	Rogue One	Nominated
2017	Zulu Award for Best Actor	Doctor Strange	Won
2019	Nordic Honorary Dragon Award	N/A	Won
2019	The Game Award for Best Performance	Death Stranding	Won
2020	D.I.C.E. Award for Outstanding Achievement in Character	Death Stranding	Nominated
2020	European Film Award for Best Actor	Another Round	Won
2020	Indiana Film Journalists Association Award for Best Actor	Another Round	Nominated
2020	Indiewire Critics' Poll Award for Best Performance	Another Round	Nominated
2020	Silver Shell for Best Actor	Another Round	Won
2021	BAFTA Award for Best Actor in a Leading Role	Another Round	Nominated
2021	Bodil Award for Best Actor	Another Round	Won
2021	Chlotrudis Award for Best Actor	Another Round	Nominated
2021	Dublin Film Critics Circle Awards for Best Actor	Another Round	Nominated
2021	Hollywood Critics Association Midseason Awards for Best Actor	Riders of Justice	Nominated
2021	Indiana Film Journalists Association for Best Actor	Riders of Justice	Nominated
2021	New Mexico Film Critics for Best Actor	Another Round	Won
2021	Robert Award for Best Actor in a Leading Role	Another Round	Won
2021	Robert Award for Best Actor in a Leading Role	Riders of Justice	Nominated
2021	Toronto Film Critics Association Award for Best Actor	Another Round	Nominated
2021	Zulu Award for Best Actor	Another Round, Riders of Justice	Won
2022	CinEuphoria Award for Best Actor – International Competition	Another Round	Won
2022	CinEuphoria Award for Best Actor – Audience Award	Another Round	Won
2022	Critics Choice Super Award for Best Actor in an Action Movie	Riders of Justice	Nominated
2022	Jupiter Award for Best International Actor	Another Round	Won
2023	European Film Award for Best Actor	The Promised Land	Won
2024	Robert Award for Best Actor in a Leading Role	The Promised Land	Won
2024	Bodil Award for Best Actor in a Leading Role	The Promised Land	Won
