= Election Night =

Election Night usually refers to the evening after an election day, when the votes are being counted and everyone is waiting for the election result.

Election Night can also refer to:

- Election Night (The West Wing) — episode 72 of The West Wing TV series
- Election Night (1998 film), a short Danish film
- Election Night (2020 film), a British political thriller
- "Election Night", a song by Bic Runga from her 2002 album Beautiful Collision
