= Men & Chicken =

2015 film

- Film poster
- Directed by: Anders Thomas Jensen
- Written by: Anders Thomas Jensen
- Produced by: Kim Magnusson; Tivi Magnusson
- Starring: David Dencik; Mads Mikkelsen; Nikolaj Lie Kaas; Søren Malling; Nicolas Bro
- Cinematography: Sebastian Blenkov
- Edited by: Anders Villadsen
- Music by: Frans Bak; Jeppe Kaas
- Production companies: DCM Pictures; Studio Babelsberg; M&M Productions; DR; Danish Film Institute; Film i Väst; FilmFyn; Nadcon Film
- Distributed by: Buena Vista International (Denmark); DCM Film Distribution (Germany)
- Release date: 5 February 2015
- Running time: 104 minutes
- Countries: Denmark; Germany
- Language: Danish

Men & Chicken (Danish: Mænd og Høns) is a 2015 Danish-language comedy film directed by Anders Thomas Jensen. It was shown in the Vanguard section of the 2015 Toronto International Film Festival. It was one of three films shortlisted by Denmark to be their submission for the Academy Award for Best Foreign Language Film at the 88th Academy Awards.

== Plot ==
Brothers Gabriel and Elias learn, via a video left by their dead father, that the parents they grew up with are not their parents but that they have the same father, Evelio Thanatos, a geneticist specializing in stem cell research. They want to meet him and find out about their mothers, so they visit Evelio's "Island of Ork," and when they approach the huge old house where Evelio lives, they are threatened and beaten by three men who are also sons of Evelio. One of the brothers uses the body of a mute swan to hit Gabriel. All of the men have hare-lips and unattractive facial features or deformities, although Gabriel's are the least glaring and he notes he had four corrective surgeries (Elias had two). Gabriel is suspicious about the "fact" that the mothers died in childbirth, and he wants to investigate, so after spending a night in Mayor Flemming's house (having been hit by the mayor's car on the road at night) he returns to the mansion.

During their second visit, after another brawl, Franz, Josef and Gregor admire Elias' fighting skills and let them come in the house. Due to the brawl, Gabriel uses a wheelchair due to a torn ligament. As Gabriel is not in pain, he refuse to leave the house to seek medical help until he meet his biological father.

Elias, who habitually masturbates throughout the day, wanders off when he finds the toilet occupied. Gregor follows him and introduces the bull which he says they 'do not touch'. This is odd as he is stroking the bull as he says this. He then shows Elias a room full of chickens and tells him they don't mind as they are big enough to lay eggs. He offers Elias a chicken suggesting he have sex with it. Elias is horrified, but Gregor protests that they are only practicing until they meet girls.

After a strange meal where the brothers had an absurd argument about who has the best plate, they went to bed. While the brothers are in bed for a bedtime story, Gabriel attempted to sneak upstairs with much difficulties but was discovered and stopped by Franz.

Finally sneaking upstairs again in the middle of the night, Gabriel and Elias discover that their father is long dead (mummified) and that their brothers have kept it a secret. Gabriel contacts Flemming and makes arrangements for a proper burial. Gabriel, a professor, recognizes the peculiar, childlike behaviors and poor social skills of his brothers, and he tries to upgrade their lives, encouraging communication in place of violence. Grabriel also wants them to read the Bible and to learn to have some forms of normalcy from the holy book.

While the new system in the house is being established, Gabriel found out that they have a basement which their father used as a research lab. The entrance has since been closed off and Franz has shown great resistance in reopening the basement. While Gabriel and Franz are having an argument in front of the basement entrance, he notices that one of the chickens has hooves.

When Gabriel finally gets into he mansion's basement, he sees preserved remains of hybrid creatures -- experiments conducted as part of Evelio's research. Before Gabriel can explore further, he is driven out by Franz and put into a punishment cage outside. After yet more beatings he escapes and leaves, abandoning and telling Elias not to follow.

While Gabriel is away the four brothers, attired in suits and tuxes, went out to find "girls" (Elias says he has never failed to score) and to get Franz's job back (he lost his job after hitting a four year-old with a Taxidermised fox). The "girls" they find are elderly residents of a care facility. Meanwhile, Gabriel is preparing to leave the island and have his brothers taken for mental health treatment. The mayor wants him to leave them alone but he is insistent, and he plans to flee with the mayor's daughter. But back at the mansion, watching the rounding up of the brothers, he notices a stork with tiny human feet and a cleft beak. He goes back into the basement and breaks into a hidden area, finding preserved human hybrid fetuses as well as dead women. He explains to his brothers that their father, like all of them, was sterile and combined non-human sperm with some of his own stem cells to fertilize his various wives. Following some failures, he achieved success with the live births of two sons; but eventually he rejected them and put them up for adoption (those were Elias and Gabriel).

Reading through the research papers, Gabriel learns that each brother is part human and part non-human, and that the mothers were killed during a deliberate fatal C-sections. Gabriel himself is part owl, Elias is part bull (half-brother to the very bull he had seen earlier), and the others are part mouse (Josef), dog (Gregor) and chicken (Franz). The elder brother knew about the research and tries to be proud that he was the most successful: 15% chicken, whereas the others had lower animal percentages. These animals were also shown on the plates that they argued about at dinnertime. Elias, ashamed for having killed the bull, is sitting in the outdoor cage. Gabriel goes outside and asks him to come out. Elias says "I am not normal" and Gabriel says "None of us are."

In the end the five brothers stay together in the big house. The final scene is softly and brightly lit and told like the opening, as if this is a fable about family. It shows the brothers surrounded by family and children, despite the fact that they are sterile.

== Cast ==
- David Dencik as Gabriel
- Mads Mikkelsen as Elias
- Nikolaj Lie Kaas as Gregor
- Søren Malling as Franz
- Nicolas Bro as Josef
- Ole Thestrup as Mayor Flemming
- Bodil Jørgensen as Ellen

== Reception ==
On the review aggregator website Rotten Tomatoes, 85% of 59 critics' reviews are positive. The website's consensus reads: "Men & Chicken's bizarre setup only skims the surface of a challenging, well-acted comedy with a warm heart to match its grotesque visuals and dark themes." Metacritic, which uses a weighted average, assigned the film a score of 64 out of 100, based on 18 critics, indicating "generally favorable" reviews.
