= Ole Thestrup =

Danish actor (1948–2018)

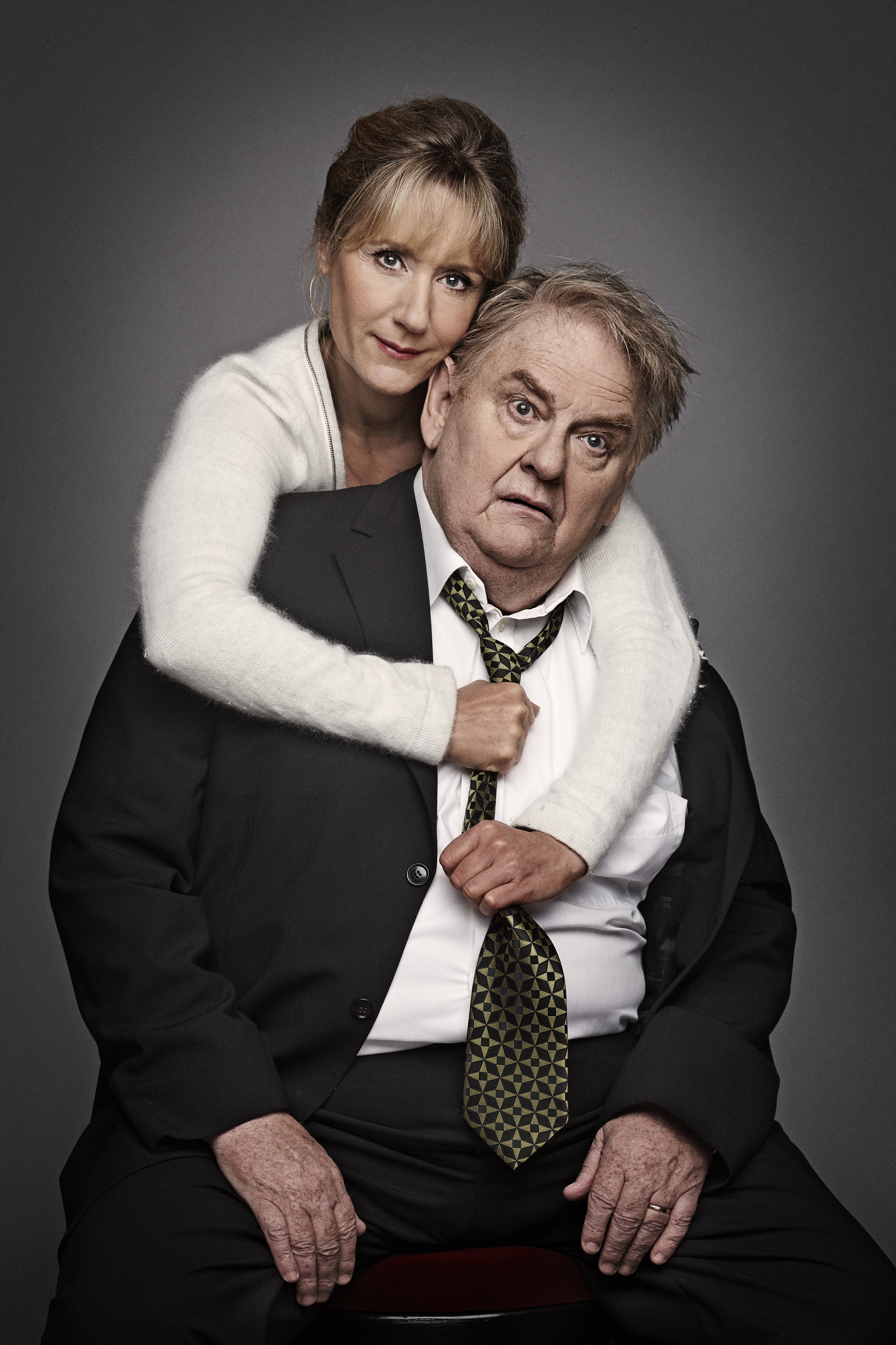
- Ole Thestrup and Anette Støvelbæk in the Folketeatret production of Le Père
- Born: 12 March 1948; Nibe, Denmark
- Died: 2 February 2018 (aged 69); Tuse Næs, Denmark
- Occupation: Actor
- Years active: 1978–2017

Ole Svane Thestrup (12 March 1948 – 2 February 2018) was a Danish actor. He appeared in many Danish films, particularly those directed by Anders Thomas Jensen, as well as television and theatre roles. He had a recurring role in the political drama series Borgen.

== Early and personal life ==
Ole Thestrup was born in Nibe, North Jutland, on 12 March 1948. He initially had ambitions to become a guitarist, before turning to acting. He joined Aarhus Theatre aged 25, completing his acting training in 1976. He later also worked at the Royal Danish Theatre in Copenhagen.

Thestrup had a history of alcohol abuse, which contributed to his 1988 imprisonment at Headingley Correctional Institution near Winnipeg, Manitoba, Canada after he caused disruption on board a British Airways flight from London to Los Angeles, leading to an emergency landing. He gave up alcohol in 1998, after receiving two citations for drunk driving in October 1997.

He died on 2 February 2018, in his home in Tuse Næs, after a long period suffering from lung cancer which had stalled his acting career in April 2017.

== Career ==
Thestrup's early television roles included the comedy series Een stor familie (1982–1983) and the 1986 Christmas calendar show Jul på Slottet, in which Politiken described him as being "perfectly cast".

In the early 2000s he played the role of the Captain in Robert Wilson's adaptation of the play Woyzeck by Georg Büchner.

Director Anders Thomas Jensen regularly cast Thestrup in his films, beginning with the Academy Award-winning 1998 short Election Night. He also appeared in Jensen's feature films Flickering Lights (2000), The Green Butchers (2003), Adam's Apples (2005) and Men & Chicken (2015).

Thestrup had a recurring role in all three series of the DR political drama Borgen as right-wing politician Svend Åge Saltum.

== Selected filmography ==
- Winterborn – 1978
- Firmaskovturen – 1978
- Danmark er lukket – 1980
- Gummi Tarzan – 1981
- Pengene eller livet – 1982
- Forræderne – 1983
- Kurt og Valde – 1983
- Med lille Klas i kufferten – 1983
- Busters verden – 1984
- Camping – 1990
- Kærlighed ved første desperate blik – 1994
- Flickering Lights – 2000
- Fruen på Hamre – 2000
- Jolly Roger – 2001
- Olsen-banden Junior – 2001
- Grev Axel – 2001
- Slim Slam Slum – 2002
- The Green Butchers – 2003
- En som Hodder – 2003
- Fakiren fra Bilbao – 2004
- Solkongen – 2005
- Adam's Apples – 2005
- Bubbles – 2006
- Frode og alle de andre rødder – 2008
- Det perfekte kup – 2008
- Oldboys – 2009
- All for One – 2011
- Freddy Frogface - 2011
- Ronal Barbaren - 2011
- Men & Chicken - 2015
- Dræberne fra Nibe - 2017

=== Television ===
- Een stor familie – 1982-1983
- Jul på Slottet – 1986
- Trafikdengsen – 2001
- Rejseholdet – 2002
- Borgen – 2010-2013
- Pendlerkids – 2012-2015
- Badehotellet – 2013-2014
