= The Last Viking (2025 film) =

2025 film by Anders Thomas Jensen

- Danish theatrical release poster
- Danish: Den sidste viking
- Directed by: Anders Thomas Jensen
- Written by: Anders Thomas Jensen
- Produced by: Sisse Graum Jørgensen; Sidsel Hybschmann
- Starring: Nikolaj Lie Kaas; Mads Mikkelsen; Sofie Gråbøl; Søren Malling; Bodil Jørgensen; Lars Brygmann; Kardo Razzazi; Nicolas Bro; Peter Düring
- Cinematography: Sebastian Blenkov
- Edited by: Anders Albjerg Kristiansen; Nicolaj Monberg
- Music by: Jeppe Kaas
- Production companies: Zentropa; Zentropa Sweden; Film i Väst
- Release dates: 30 August 2025 (Venice); 9 October 2025 (Denmark)
- Running time: 116 minutes
- Countries: Denmark; Sweden
- Languages: Danish; Swedish
- Box office: $3 million

The Last Viking (Danish: Den sidste viking) is a 2025 black comedy film written and directed by Anders Thomas Jensen. It stars Nikolaj Lie Kaas and Mads Mikkelsen. The film had its world premiere out of competition at the 82nd Venice International Film Festival on 30 August 2025. It received a theatrical release in Denmark on 9 October 2025.

== Premise ==
The movie opens with an animated sequence describing a children's story. A Viking chieftain prides himself on his clan all being equally happy and with equal worth. His youngest son loses an arm, and is driven to despair when he compares himself and his inability to his peers. As a response, his father orders the entire clan to chop off their arms to make everyone equal again.

Before serving a 15-year prison sentence for bank robbery, Anker entrusts his brother, Manfred, to bury the heist money in the forest by their mother's house for safekeeping. Upon his release, Anker is frustrated to find that Manfred has since developed dissociative identity disorder (DID) with suicidal tendencies and cannot recall where he hid the money bag. Manfred believes himself to be John Lennon, a member of the English rock band The Beatles. When addressed as "Manfred" - and not as "John" - he attempts to harm himself, often in a violent manner. He also has a pathological obsession with stealing dogs, which has earned the ire of the neighborhood.

On one drunken night, Anker meets psychiatrist Lothar who devises a plan to cure Manfred by letting him play out his delusion with other psychiatric patients who identify as members of The Beatles, resolving the contradiction between his identity and environment. Once he regains his sobriety the next morning, Anker rejects this plan, but discovers he has already broken Manfred out of the hospital. Anker then attempts to refresh Manfred's memory by travelling to their mother's house, discovering that it has been turned into an Airbnb and sharing an awkward dinner with the new owners, Margrethe and Werner, who both resent the failure of each other's professional careers; Margrethe is a failed model, while Werner is a failed fashion designer turned children's book author. Lothar follows them, having assembled the other "Beatles" patients. He convinces Anker of the plan, and for motivation, Lothar registers them for a local talent competition. The initial rehearsals go poorly due to the various idiosyncrasies of the patients. Ringo is completely mute and an amateur drummer. George-Paul is musically talented but can only perform ABBA, and is obsessed with the Holocaust. Manfred has no musical talent whatsoever, testing the patience of everyone else.

The next morning, Anker convinces Manfred to search for the bag, but is enraged when a spot marked with Viking runes turns out to be the grave of the family dog. The bones trigger repressed memories of their abusive father, who caned Anker and killed the family dog when Manfred "acted out" in public. At the same time, Anker's old partner-in-crime, Flemming, has spent his cut of the bank job and has significant debt. He decides to take Anker's share, assaulting and torturing his sister Freja for his location; Freja escapes and flees to their mother's. The next morning, Anker awakens to find several stacks of money and a Norse rune has been left at his bedside by Manfred. Werner has sewn the band outfits reminiscent of Sgt. Pepper's Lonely Hearts Club Band, and the retrieval of a portion of the money encourages Anker to fully endorse the experiment.

The band begin to leave for the talent show, but Werner and Paul-George begin an argument that leads to Paul-George attacking him with a guitar before quitting the band. While digging for the money, Freja offhandedly reveals to Anker that there are four escaped patients. Confused, Anker discovers that Lothar is the fourth patient, and upon confronting him, Lothar beats him with a frying pan. Anker is saved by Manfred, but Lothar escapes in a van. Upon waking, Anker angrily blames Manfred for their problems, including their father's abuse, and Manfred emotionally rushes out to the barn and begins to carve runes into a piece of wood.

That night, Flemming arrives, having installed a tracking app on Freja's phone. He bludgeons Margrethe, and ties up Anker in the barn before torturing and abducting Manfred, forcing him at gunpoint to drive him to the money. Manfred, distressed, drives at excessive speed before Flemming accidentally uses his "real" name, causing him to jump out of the car in an attempt at self-harm. The resulting high-speed crash mortally injures Flemming.

Manfred frees Anker, and leads him into the forest. Instead of the stash, Anker digs up a suitcase full of clothes and the passport of their father. This triggers another flashback, in which Anker recalls their father's death; after their father beat Anker again for letting Manfred wear a Viking helmet in a school photo, Manfred pushed him down the stairs to protect his brother. Anker could have saved him, but chose to kill their father with the family axe after he continued to threaten Manfred with abuse. Anker then disposed of the evidence, burying his father and the suitcase, convincing the family that he had an affair and abandoned them. During the murder, the death of John Lennon is shown on the TV, crystallizing Manfred's alternate personality.

In the present, Anker finally reconciles with his brother, before returning to confess his crime to Freja. Both Lothar and Paul-George return, with Lothar dramatically confessing that his psychological issues stem from his father, the manager of the only IKEA to ever be closed. Manfred places an arrow-shaped rune in the flowerbed made of the brothers' old wagon, allowing Anker to dig underneath and finally recover the stash of money.

Much later, Anker, Freja, Margrethe and Werner are in attendance at the talent show. Manfred, Lothar, Paul-George and Ringo perform as the "Flying Beavers", performing "Twist and Shout" to the enthusiasm of the audience, with Anker smiling for the first time. When Margrethe and Werner return home, he discovers Manfred has scribbled Viking horns on some of his characters. Inspired, he finishes his book, transitioning back to the animated story from the beginning.

The son of the chieftain loses a foot in battle, and again, all of the members of the clan have their feet chopped off. Despite their disfigurements, they are even more happy and united. But when the son is accidentally decapitated, the chieftain orders the entire clan to be decapitated as well. None of them disagree, and when the chieftain, the last Viking to be executed, sees his people before him, he is deeply comforted by the fact that the entire clan had been made equal.

== Cast ==
- Nikolaj Lie Kaas as Anker
- Mads Mikkelsen as Manfred / John
- Sofie Gråbøl as Margrethe
- Søren Malling as Werner
- Bodil Jørgensen as Freja
- Lars Brygmann as Lothar / Kjeld
- Kardo Razzazi as Hamdan / Paul-George
- Nicolas Bro as Flemming
- Peter Düring as Anton / Ringo
- Lars Ranthe as Father
- Anette Støvelbæk as Dr. Halberg

== Production ==
Originally titled Back to Reality, the film marks the sixth collaboration between Anders Thomas Jensen, Nikolaj Lie Kaas, and Mads Mikkelsen, preceded by Riders of Justice, Adam’s Apples, Flickering Lights, The Green Butchers, and Men & Chicken. Principal photography began on 19 August 2024. Filming took place over seven weeks in Denmark and Sweden, specifically in Funen and a forest near Tollered.

== Release ==
TrustNordisk owns the international sales rights to the film, which was pre-sold to Neue Visionen for Germany, Austria, and Switzerland; September Film for the Benelux; Plaion for Italy, Estinfilm for the Baltics; Vertigo Média for Hungary; Best Film for Poland; Film Europe for the Czech Republic and Slovakia; and September Film Rights for Singapore. On 10 February 2025, the film was acquired by Starcat Cable Network for Japan. On 12 May 2025, the film was acquired by Avalon for Spain, Videorama for Greece, and Beta Film for Bulgaria. On 19 September 2025, the film was acquired by Samuel Goldwyn Films for distribution in the United States.

A promotional clip was released on 29 August 2025. The film had its world premiere out of competition at the 82nd Venice International Film Festival on 30 August 2025. It received a theatrical release in Denmark on 9 October 2025.

== Reception ==
On the review aggregator website Rotten Tomatoes, 90% of 61 critics' reviews are positive. The website's consensus reads: "The Last Viking leverages Nikolaj Lie Kaas and Mads Mikkelsen's finely tuned chemistry to anchor its cartoonish violence and offbeat humor, resulting in a film that's as sincere and affecting as it is bizarre." Metacritic, which uses a weighted average, assigned the film a score of 73 out of 100, based on 8 critics, indicating "generally favorable" reviews.

The Last Viking was a major box-office success in Denmark, becoming Anders Thomas Jensen's best-selling film in his home country, with more than 700,000 tickets sold.
