= Alien on Stage =

2020 British documentary film

- Directed by: Danielle Kummer; Lucy Harvey
- Written by: Danielle Kummer; Lucy Harvey
- Produced by: Danielle Kummer; Lucy Harvey
- Cinematography: Danielle Kummer
- Edited by: Danielle Kummer; Emily Badascu
- Music by: Alex Shesha
- Release date: 2020
- Running time: 86 minutes
- Country: United Kingdom
- Language: English

Alien on Stage is a 2020 British documentary film about a group of bus drivers from Dorset who in 2013 put on a stage version of Alien instead of their usual annual pantomime production, and were invited to perform at the Leicester Square Theatre in London's West End.

It won the Audience Award for best documentary at the 2021 Leeds International Film Festival, and the Silver Scream Award at the 2021 Imagine Film Festival. A reviewer for The Guardian described the film as "warm and full of laughs".
