= The Green Butchers =

- Danish DVD artwork
- Directed by: Anders Thomas Jensen
- Written by: Anders Thomas Jensen
- Produced by: Kim Magnusson; Tivi Magnusson
- Starring: Mads Mikkelsen; Nikolaj Lie Kaas; Line Kruse; Ole Thestrup
- Edited by: Anders Villadsen
- Music by: Jeppe Kaas
- Distributed by: Sandrew Metronome
- Release date: 21 March 2003 (Denmark)
- Running time: 95 minutes
- Country: Denmark
- Language: Danish

The Green Butchers (Danish: De grønne slagtere) is a 2003 Danish black comedy film starring Mads Mikkelsen, Nikolaj Lie Kaas, and Line Kruse, written and directed by Anders Thomas Jensen. It features two butchers, Svend "Sweat" and Bjarne, who start their own shop to get away from their arrogant boss. Cannibalism is soon introduced to the plot, and further complications arise due to the reappearance of Bjarne's intellectually disabled twin brother Eigil. The film won several awards in Europe, including the 2003 Méliès d'Or.

== Plot ==
Svend is barbecuing and his fiancée, Tina, is bothering him about the food. Bjarne arrives and is introduced to one of Tina's co-workers, Beate. Bjarne does not take to Beate's flirtation and kicks her under the table until she leaves crying. The next day, as Holger tells a customer a story about sausages, Svend complains to Bjarne that they could open a better butcher shop. Holger insults them and tells Svend that his marinade is terrible. Soon thereafter, Svend meets with a realtor, "House Hans", and Bjarne at a closed butcher shop, and decides to purchase it and open his own shop.

Bjarne visits the sanatorium where his brother Eigil is being kept on life support, and tells Nurse Juhl to take him off life support because he needs his inheritance. Svend and Bjarne discuss hiring an electrician to fix the lights in the meat freezer, and business cards. Bjarne then visits the cemetery where his parents and wife are buried. Astrid introduces herself and Bjarne invites her to the opening of his shop.

On opening day, there are no customers, and Svend accidentally locks up an electrician in the meat freezer. The next morning Holger arrives and mocks Svend, and makes an order for a dinner party to spitefully be his first customer. Svend reveals that he prepared the electrician's leg and sold it to Holger. The next day, when Bjarne arrives, a line of patrons stretches outside the door of the shop. "Svend's chicky-wickies", as he calls the human flesh marinated in his special sauce, are extremely popular. Bjarne is reluctant at selling the rest of the body, but because of the great demand he gives in. Hans arrives, who has just lost his job, and Svend locks him in the freezer. Svend tells Bjarne that he found a dead body. A television news crew reports a story about the new butcher shop. Meanwhile, at the sanatorium, Eigil unexpectedly wakes up after the doctors turn off his life support.

Eigil comes to the shop, but Bjarne hides and makes Svend send him away. Svend begins dating Beate and when Tina tries to win Svend back, he locks her in the meat freezer. Reverend Villumsen tells Holger that the chicky-wickies tasted like his wife, Grethe. Bjarne grows tired of Eigil's visits to the butcher shop, and talks to Nurse Juhl, who recommends that he seek a psychiatrist. He tells her to stop by the butcher shop and speak with Svend. The next day Svend tells Bjarne that the nurse was his latest victim, and to throw out the rotten chicken meat. Eigil takes the dead chickens to the cemetery to bury them, where Astrid finds him and befriends him. Bjarne then visits Astrid at the church and leaves when he sees Eigil there.

At the church, as Astrid and Eigil are tending to the chickens, Reverend Villumsen and Holger summon Astrid to the reverend's office. They tell Astrid that they believe the butchers are murdering people, and Holger reveals the details of the accident that claimed Bjarne's family. Astrid takes Eigil to the butcher shop with some dead chickens.

When Bjarne does not find Astrid at the church, he stops by the butcher shop. He finds out that Svend locked Astrid and Eigil in the freezer. Astrid leaves upset, and Bjarne threatens Svend, who escapes. The next day Svend does not show up at the shop and Bjarne opens without any human meat to sell. Instead, he prepares "chicky-wickies" with regular chicken. Holger and the public health authorities arrive and shut the shop down. Svend arrives and nearly confesses to the murders. The health authorities do not find any evidence of foul play and leave. Out in the alley, Bjarne tells Svend that the chicky-wickies were popular because of the marinade, rather than the fact that it was human flesh.

At the beach, Svend can be seen playing with Eigil while Bjarne is sitting by the wooden jetty. A smiling Astrid approaches Bjarne and reconciled.

== Cast ==
- Line Kruse as Astrid: A beautiful girl who works for Reverend Villumsen at the church and cemetery. Astrid cares for the chickens on the church, helps keep the graveyard clean, and assists with cremations.
- Nikolaj Lie Kaas as Bjarne: A marijuana smoking butcher who works at Svend & Co. He kills animals and collects their skeletons.
  - Nikolaj Lie Kaas also portrays Eigil: Bjarne's twin brother. He was born with an intellectual disability. He caused a car accident which killed his parents and Bjarne's wife and left him brain damaged in a sanatorium for seven years. Eigil is overly fond of animals and is a vegetarian.
- Mads Mikkelsen as Svend: The owner of Svend & Co. butch shop. Because his parents died as a child he never has felt loved. Svend's color of choice is green.
- Nicolas Bro as Hans Peterson: Known as "House Hans" because he is a realtor. Hans sells Svend his butcher shop, and later loses his job.
- Aksel Erhadtsen as Reverend Villumsen: The reverend at a local church. On his honeymoon his plane crashed and he ate his wife to survive. His office is full of plants.
- Bodil Jørgensen as Tina: Svend's fiancée until she broke it off due to his failing business. Once his butcher shop became popular she tried to get back together with Svend.
- Ole Thestrup as Holger: Previously Svend and Bjarne's employer at his own sausage butcher shop. He is also the first customer at Svend & Co., and because of his purchase the news gets out of how good their product is.
- Lily Weiding as Ms. Juhl: A nurse at Eigil's sanatorium.

== Production ==
The Green Butchers is a black comedy film written and directed by Anders Thomas Jensen.

The film was produced by Tivi and Kim Magnusson through M & M Productions and TV2 Denmark. Funding was provided by the Danish Film Institute and New Danish Screen.

Cinematography was by Sebastian Blenkov, and music by Jeppe Kaas. It was edited by Anders Villadsen.

== Release ==
De grønne slagtere had its world premiere on 7 March 2003, as a midnight launch party screening at the Imperial Cinema in Copenhagen as part of the NatFilm Festival, the precursor to the Copenhagen International Film Festival, followed by a release in Danish cinemas on 21 March 2003 by distributors Sandrew Metronome.

The film screened at the 2003 Haugesund Film Festival in Haugesund, Norway, and had its North American premiere in the Discovery program on 26 September at the 2003 Toronto International Film Festival that year. It was released in cinemas in Sweden on 5 December 2003. The film also screened at several film festivals in 2004, including the Amsterdam Fantastic Film Festival in Amsterdam, The Netherlands; the Brussels International Festival of Fantasy Film in Brussels, Belgium; and the Sochi International Film Festival in Russia.

It had a limited theatrical release in the United States as The Green Butchers on 10 December 2004, distributed by Newmarket Films.

The Green Butchers was released on DVD on 17 May 2005. and was screened on Eurochannel.

== Reception ==
The Green Butchers rated 63%, based on 27 reviews, on the review aggregator Rotten Tomatoes.

Kelcie Matton, reviewing the film for Collider in May 2023, called both the script and Mikkelsen's performance "nuanced", and wrote "The Hollywood machine could learn a thing or two from Denmark".

== Accolades ==
- 2003: Méliès d'Or
- Grand Prize of European Fantasy Film in Gold, Amsterdam Fantastic Film Festival 2004
- Grand Prize of European Fantasy Film in Silver, Brussels International Festival of Fantasy Film 2004
- FIPRESCI Award, Sochi International Film Festival 2004
