= A Place Nearby =

- Film poster
- Directed by: Kaspar Rostrup
- Written by: Martha Christensen; Kaspar Rostrup
- Produced by: Tina Dalhoff
- Starring: Ghita Nørby; Thure Lindhardt
- Cinematography: Eric Kress
- Edited by: Grete Møldrup
- Music by: Fuzzy
- Release date: 21 January 2000
- Running time: 100 minutes
- Country: Denmark
- Language: Danish

A Place Nearby (Danish: Her i nærheden) is a 2000 Danish drama film directed by Kaspar Rostrup and starring Ghita Nørby and Thure Lindhardt. It was Denmark's submission to the 73rd Academy Awards for the Academy Award for Best Foreign Language Film, but was not accepted as a nominee.

== Synopsis ==
When a girl is found murdered in a nearby park, a woman hides her suspicions that her autistic son may be the killer.

== Cast ==
- Ghita Nørby
- Thure Lindhardt
- Frits Helmuth
- Henning Moritzen
- Bodil Lindorff
- Hannah Bjarnhof
- Sarah Boberg
- Thomas Bo Larsen
- Niels Anders Thorn
- Pia Vieth
- Niels Skousen
- Susanne Jagd
- Peter Aude
- Mira Wanting
- Holger Vistisen
- Niels Weyde

== See also ==
- Cinema of Denmark
- List of submissions to the 73rd Academy Awards for Best Foreign Language Film
