= Frode og alle de andre rødder =

- Author: Ole Lund Kirkegaard
- Language: Danish
- Genre: Children's novel
- Publisher: Gyldendal
- Publication date: 1979
- Publication place: Denmark

Frode og alle de andre rødder
- Original film poster
- Directed by: Bubber
- Screenplay by: Lars Mering, Anne-Marie Olesen
- Story by: Ole Lund Kirkegaard (novel)
- Produced by: Tivi Magnusson, Tomas Radoor, Johanne Stryhn Felding and Christian Potalivo
- Starring: Arto Louis Eriksen; Sasha Sofie Lund; Thomas Meilstrup
- Cinematography: Simon Mouridsen
- Edited by: Rikke Selin, Henrik Thiesen
- Music by: Jesper Sveidahl
- Release date: 2008
- Country: Denmark
- Language: Danish

Frode og alle de andre rødder (literally Frode and all the other rascals) is a famous Danish children's book, that was also adapted to a feature film. It is about the adventures of Frode who learns about a summer festival and wants to go there except that it can cost 5000 kroners and he has to arrange for its financing.

== Book ==
Frode og alle de andre rødder is a book written by Ole Lund Kirkegaard, a Danish writer of children's literature and youth literature. It was published in 1979.

== Film ==
The book was adapted into a film in 2008 and is directed by Bubber and produced by Tivi Magnusson, Tomas Radoor, Johanne Stryhn Felding and Christian Potalivo.

Cast

- Arto Louis Eriksen as Frode
- Sasha Sofie Lund as Stinne
- Thomas Meilstrup as Læris
- Ole Thestrup as Storm
- Birthe Neumann as Irene TV
- Bodil Jørgensen as Fru Rask
- Nicolaj Kopernikus as Lærer Peter
- Rasmus Bjerg as Vicevært

Nominations

In the 2009 Robert Festival, it was nominated for a Robert for:

- "Best Children/Family Film" for director Bubble
- "Best Song" for Thomas Buttenschøn
