= Mr. K (film) =

2024 surreal drama film

- Theatrical release poster
- Directed by: Tallulah H. Schwab
- Written by: Tallulah H. Schwab
- Produced by: Erik Glijnis; Ineke Kanters; Leontine Petit; Dries Phlypo; Judy Tossell; Jan van der Zanden
- Starring: Crispin Glover; Sunnyi Melles; Fionnula Flanagan; Bjørn Sundquist; Dearbhla Molloy; Barbara Sarafian; Sam Louwyck
- Cinematography: Frank Griebe
- Edited by: Maarten Janssens
- Music by: Stan Lee Cole
- Production companies: Lemming Film; A Private View; The Film Kitchen; Finnish Impact Film Fund
- Distributed by: Paradiso Entertainment (Netherlands)
- Release dates: 6 September 2024 (TIFF); 16 January 2025 (Netherlands)
- Running time: 94 minutes
- Countries: Netherlands; Belgium; Norway
- Language: English
- Box office: $153,594

Mr. K is a 2024 surrealist mystery drama film written and directed by Tallulah H. Schwab starring Crispin Glover.

== Plot ==
Mr. K, a traveling magician, finds himself in a Kafkaesque nightmare when he can’t find the exit of the hotel he has slept in. His attempts to get out only pull him deeper inside, entangling him further with the hotel and its curious inhabitants.

== Cast ==
- Crispin Glover as Mr. K
- Sunnyi Melles as Gaga
- Fionnula Flanagan as Ruth Monchien
- Bjørn Sundquist as Chef
- Dearbhla Molloy as Sara Monchien
- Barbara Sarafian as Mrs. Hum
- Jan Gunnar Røise as Anton
- Esmée van Kampen as Melinda
- Sam Louwyck as Grey Man
- Valeria Roco as Chambermaid

== Production ==
The film is a Norwegian-Belgian-Dutch co-production by Lemming Productions along with A Private View and The Film Kitchen and it had the participation and funding from Netherlands Film Fund, The Netherlands Film Production Incentive, CoBO Fund, AVROTROS, Creative Europe, LevelK, Eurimages, Screen Flanders, Flanders Audiovisual Fund, Belgian Tax Shelter and Norsk Filminstitut.

In April 2023, the project was revealed to have wrapped filming in the Netherlands.

== Release ==
The film premiered in the Platform Prize competition of the 49th Toronto International Film Festival on 6 September 2024. It also played as part of the Flash Forward program of the 29th Busan International Film Festival and competed in the official selection at the 57th Sitges Film Festival. It was released in the Netherlands on 16 January 2025.

== Reception ==
On the review aggregator website Rotten Tomatoes, 79% of 19 critics' reviews are positive. Metacritic, which uses a weighted average, assigned the film a score of 56 out of 100, based on 6 critics, indicating "mixed or average" reviews.

In a review for RogerEbert.com, Simon Abrams gave the film two out of four stars, writing "there’s not much to Mr. K beyond its second-hand surrealism and strained counter-mythmaking", though he found Glover believable in the titular role.

== Awards and nominations ==
Year	Festival	Category	Nominee(s)	Result
2024	Imagine Film Festival	Méliès d’Argent for Best European Fantastic Film		Won
2024	Toronto International Film Festival	Platform Award		Nominated
2024	Sitges Film Festival	Best Motion Picture		Nominated
2024	Isla Calavera Film Festival	Best Costume Design		Won
2025	Grossmann Fantastic Film and Wine Festival	Vicious Cat for Best European Fantastic Film		Won
2025	Fantasporto	Audience Award		Won
2025	Netherlands Film Festival	Golden Calf Best Production Design		Nominated
2025	Méliès International Festivals Federation	Méliès d'Or for Best European Fantastic Film		Won
2025	Film Festival Songielettrici	Best VFX/SFX		Won
2025	Film Festival Songielettrici	Best Director		Won
2025	Film Club's The Lost Weekend	Avant Robot Award second place - Best Director		Won
2025	Film Club's The Lost Weekend	Best Supporting Actress		Won
2025	Film Club's The Lost Weekend	Best Production Design		Won
2025	Film Club's The Lost Weekend	Best Cinematography		Won
2025	Film Club's The Lost Weekend	Best Supporting Actor		Nominated
2025	Film Club's The Lost Weekend	Best Editing		Nominated
