= Eric Kress =

Danish cinematographer (born 1962)

- Born: 25 March 1962 (age 63); Zürich, Switzerland
- Occupation: Cinematographer
- Years active: 1991–present
- Website: www.erickress.dk

Eric Kress (born 25 March 1962) is a Danish cinematographer.

== Biography ==
Kress was born in Zürich on 25 March 1962 to a French father and a Danish mother. He studied cinematography at the National Film School of Denmark in Copenhagen from 1987 to 1991.

== Personal life ==
His brother Philippe Kress is also a film photographer.

== Filmography ==
Year	Film	Director	Other notes
1995	The Kingdom	Lars von Trier	Robert Award for Best cinematography
1997	Eye of the Eagle	´Peter Flinth	
1998	Albert		
2000	A Place Nearby	Kaspar Rostrup	Johan Ankerstjerne Award
2000	Flickering Lights	Anders Thomas Jensen	Robert Award for Best cinematography
2000	Mirakel		
2001	Shake It All About	Hella Joof	
2002	The Fifth Woman		
2003	Stealing Rembrandt	Jannik Johansen	
2004	The Fakir	Peter Flinth	Nominated Robert Award for Best Cinematography
2005	One Step Behind		
2007	Arn – The Knight Templar	Peter Flinth	Nominated - Guldbagge Award for Best Cinematography
2009	The Girl with the Dragon Tattoo	Niels Arden Oplev	Nominated - Guldbagge Award for Best Cinematography
2010	Borgen		TV series: 4 episodes
2011	Those Who Kill		TV Series: 2 Episodes
2013	The Keeper of Lost Things	Mikkel Nørgaard	
2014	Waltz for Monica	Per Fly	Nominated - Guldbagge Award for Best Cinematography
2014	The Absent One	Mikkel Nørgaard	
2014	Taken 3	Olivier Megaton	
2016	Colossal	Nacho Vigalondo	
2022	Halo	Roel Reiné	
