= Ole Lund Kirkegaard =

Danish writer (1940–1979)

Ole Lund Kirkegaard (29 July 1940, in Aarhus – 24 March 1979) was a Danish writer of children's and youth literature, as well as a teacher. He mainly wrote about the interactions between adults and children. The main character in his books is usually an anti-hero. In 1969, he was awarded with the Danish Ministry of Culture's children book prize (Kulturministeriets Børnebogspris)

Kirkegaard grew up in Skanderborg just south of Aarhus, and many of his stories were inspired by his own childhood experiences there. He also illustrated his own books. On a cold winter night in 1979, after having had too much to drink, he fell in the snow on his way home and could not get up again. He froze to death on the spot, at just 38 years of age. A street in Skanderborg is named after him (Ole Lund Kirkegaards Stræde).

== Bibliography ==
In Danish:

- Lille Virgil (lit. Little Virgil), 1967
- Albert, 1968
- Orla Frøsnapper (lit. Orla Frogsnapper), 1969
- Hodja fra Pjort (lit. Hodja from Pjort), 1970
- Otto er et næsehorn (lit. Otto is a rhinoceros), 1972
- Gummi-Tarzan (lit. Rubber-Tarzan), 1975
- En flodhest i huset (lit. A hippopotamus in the house), 1978
- Frode og alle de andre rødder (lit. Frode and all the other rascals), 1979
- Per og bette Mads (lit. Per and wee Mads), 1981
- Mig og Bedstefar - og så Nisse Pok (lit. Me and Grandpa - and Pok the Pixi too), 1982
- Tippe Tophat og andre fortællinger (lit. Tippe Tophat and other stories), 1982
- Anton og Arnold flytter til byen (lit. Anton and Arnold move to the city), 1988
- Anton og Arnold i det vilde vesten (lit. Anton and Arnold in the wild west), 1988
- Frække Friderik (lit. Naughty Friderik), 2008

Only a few of his works have been translated into English. This includes:

- "Otto is a Rhino: Story and Drawings", Addison-Wesley Pub. Co., 1976

== Films ==
The stories of Ole Lund Kirkegaard have inspired several Danish films, including a TV series in 1977.

== Sources and further reading ==
- "Ole Lund Kirkegaard". Dutch website. Archived from the original on 10 February 2012.
- "Kirkegaard, Ole Lund-". Grote Winkler Prins (9 ed.). 1991.
