= Ulrich Thomsen =

Danish actor (born 1963)

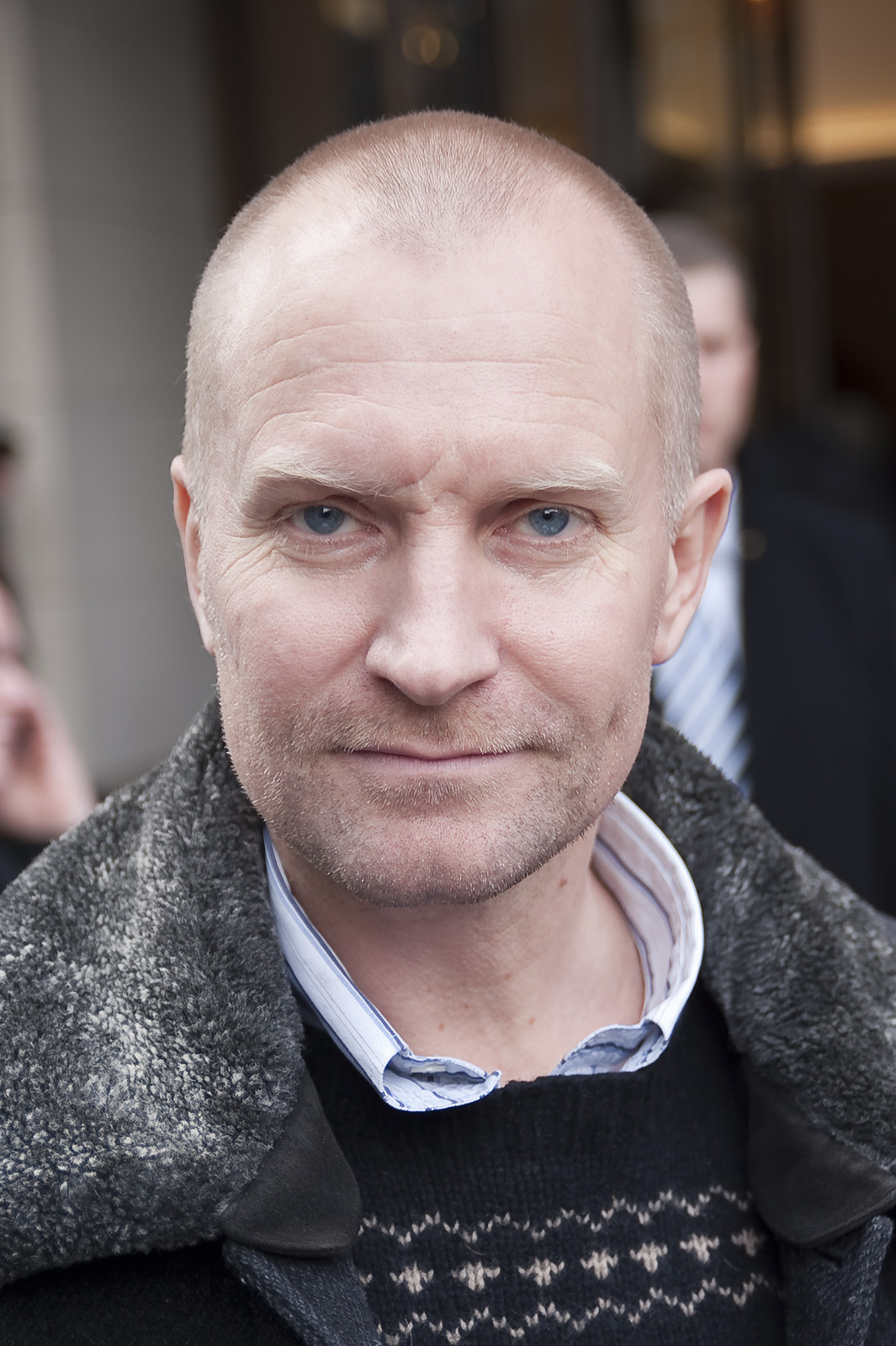
- Thomsen at a press conference for The International in 2009
- Born: 6 December 1963 (age 62); Odense, Denmark
- Occupation: Actor
- Years active: 1994–present
- Spouse: Cathrine Ekehed
- Children: 2
- Website: ulrichthomsenactor.com

Ulrich Thomsen (born 6 December 1963) is a Danish actor, best known for his role as Christian in the 1998 film The Celebration and as Kai Proctor in the Cinemax original series Banshee (2013–2016). Since 2026, he is currently starring as the DC Comics character Sinestro in the DC Universe, beginning with the superhero crime neo-Western thriller series Lanterns.

== Early and personal life ==
Ulrich Thomsen was born in (Næsby) Odense, Denmark and graduated from the Danish National School of Theatre and Contemporary Dance in 1993, after which he performed in several theatres in Copenhagen, such as Dr. Dantes Aveny, Mungo Park and Østre Gasværks Teater. He is married to Catherine Ekehed and they have two children, including Alma Ekehed Thomsen, who is an actress. Both Ulrich and his daughter appeared in Face to Face portraying a father, Bjørn and his daughter, Christina.

Aside from his native language Danish, Thomsen is fluent in German and English. He is vegan.

== Career ==
His film debut was in 1994 in Nightwatch, directed by Ole Bornedal. Since then, he has starred in a number of roles including, among others, Thomas Vinterberg's The Biggest Heroes (1996), Susanne Bier's Sekten (1997) and Anders Thomas Jensen's Flickering Lights (2000). The major breakthrough in his career came in the 1998 film Festen followed by an important role in the James Bond film The World Is Not Enough (1999) portraying the part of henchman Sasha Davidov.

This established Thomsen as an international actor, famous outside his native Denmark. He played a part in the 2002 English film Killing Me Softly. In 2009, he played Jonas Skarssen, the lead villain in Tom Tykwer's The International. From 2013 to 2016, he starred as series regular in Banshee playing the role of primary antagonist, Kai Proctor.

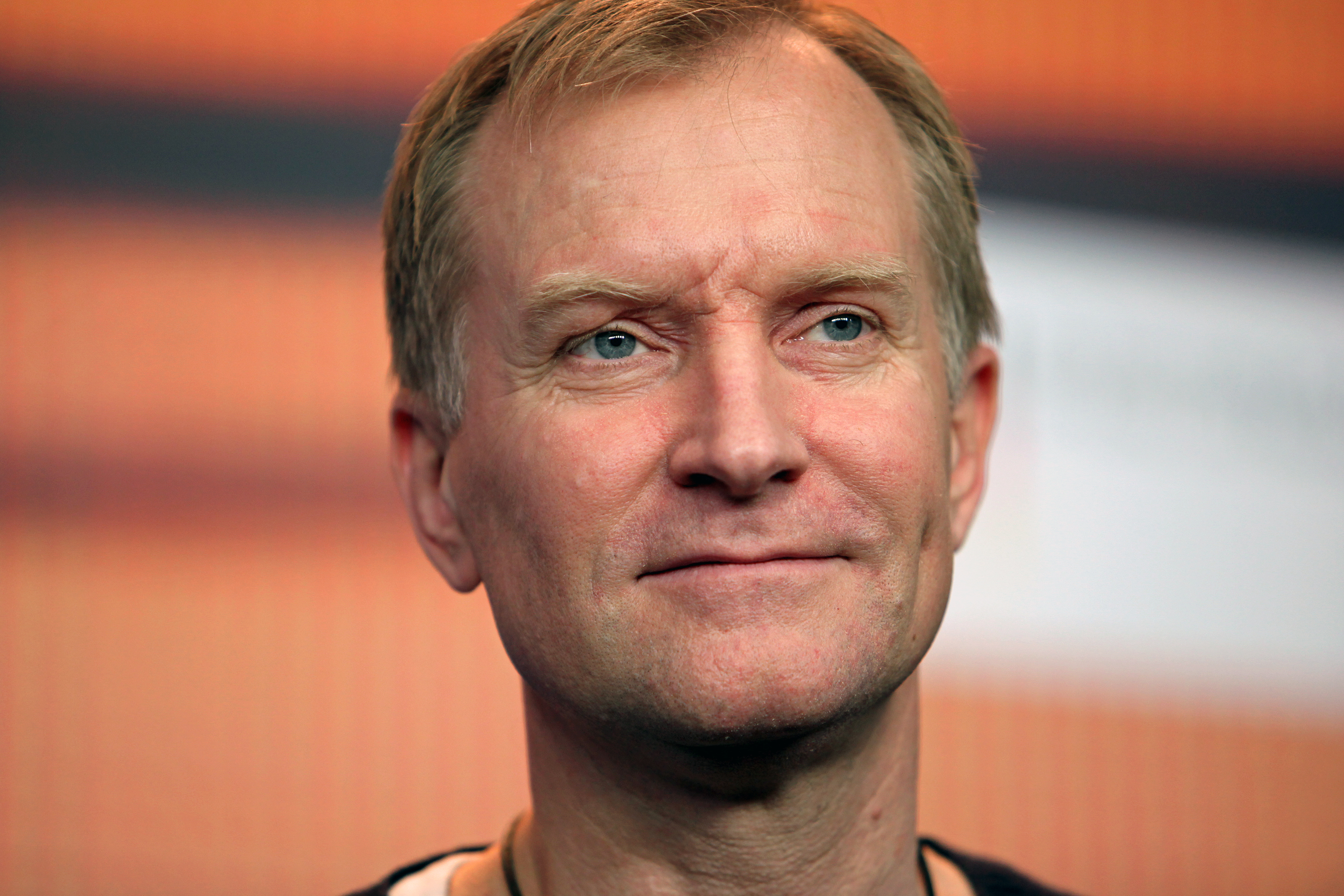
Thomsen in 2016

== Filmography ==
=== Film ===
Key
†	Denotes films that have not yet been released

Year	Title	Role	Notes
1994	Nightwatch	Rod 1	
1996	Portland	Lasse	
1996	De nye lejere	Peter	Short film
1996	The Biggest Heroes	Peter	Robert Award for Best Actor in a Supporting Role; Rouen Nordic Film Festival Award for Best Actor
1996	Café Hector	Christian	Short film
1997	Kys, kærlighed og kroner	Holger	Short film
1997	Credo	Svane	
1997	Royal Blues	Christian	
1998	Baby Doom	Magnus	
1998	Tempo	Dirgenten	
1998	Festen	Christian Klingenfeldt-Hansen	Bodil Award for Best Actor in a Leading Role; Robert Award for Best Actor in a Leading Role; Nominated—European Film Award for Best Actor
1998	Angel of the Night	Alex	
1998	Election Night	Peter	Short film
1999	The World Is Not Enough	Sasha Davidov	
2000	Maries Herz		Short film
2000	The Weight of Water	John Hontvedt	
2000	Flickering Lights	Peter	
2000	Solen er så rød	Sælgeren	Short film
2001	Mostly Martha	Samuel "Sam" Thalberg	
2001	Mike Bassett: England Manager	Dr. Hans Shoegaarten	
2001	The Zookeeper	Dragov	
2001	P.O.V.	Henrik	
2002	Den gamle møller	Kulturgangster I	Short film
2002	Killing Me Softly	Klaus	
2002	Max	Karl Mayr	
2003	The Inheritance	Christoffer	Bodil Award for Best Actor in a Leading Role; Flaiano Film Festival Award for Best Actor; Mexico City International Contemporary Film Festival Special Award for Best Actor; Robert Award for Best Actor in a Leading Role; Rouen Nordic Film Festival Award for Best Actor
2003	Baby	Marc	Also executive producer
2003	Blueprint	Dr. Martin Fisher	
2004	The Rocket Post	Gerhard Zucker	
2004	Brothers	Michael	San Sebastián International Film Festival Silver Seashell for Best Actor; Nominated—Bodil Award for Best Actor in a Leading Role; Nominated—European Film Award for Best Actor; Nominated—Robert Award for Best Actor in a Leading Role
2004	Sergeant Pepper	Johnny Sínger	
2005	Adam’s Apples	Adam Pedersen	Bucheon International Fantastic Film Festival Award for Best Actor; Fantasporto Directors' Week Award for Best Actor; Nominated–Robert Award for Best Actor in a Leading Role
2005	Kingdom of Heaven	Templar Master	
2005	Allegro	Zetterstrøm	
2006	Han, hun og Strindberg	—N/a	Executive producer
2006	Sprængfarlig Bombe	Tonny Jensen	
2006	Impossibly Yours	Jan	
2007	Opium: Diary of a Madwoman	Dr. Brenner	
2007	The Substitute	Jesper Osböll	Nominated—Robert Award for Best Actor in a Supporting Role
2007	Fremkaldt	Nikolaj	Short film
2007	Hitman	Mikhail Belicoff	
2008	One Shot	—N/a	Executive producer
2008	The Broken	Dr. Robert Zachman	
2008	Fear Me Not	Mikael	Mar del Plata International Film Festival Award for Best Actor; Nominated—Bodil Award for Best Actor in a Leading Role; Nominated—Robert Award for Best Actor in a Leading Role
2008	Reservations	Leigh	
2009	Lulu und Jimi	Harry Hass	
2009	The International	Jonas Skarssen	
2009	Duplicity	Big Swiss Suit	
2009	Tell-Tale	Lethe	
2010	Centurion	Gorlacon	
2010	The Silence	Peer Sommer	
2010	In a Better World	Claus	
2011	Season of the Witch	Johann Eckhardt	
2011	The Thing	Dr. Sander Halvorson	
2012	Aya	Mr. Overby	Short film
2013	The Notebook	Officer Tiszt	
2013	The Miracle	Jakob	
2014	A Second Chance	Simon	
2014	Livsforkortelses Ekspert	Michael	
2015	Mortdecai	Romanov	
2015	Skyggen af en helt	Gustaf (voice)	
2015	Sommeren '92	Richard Møller Nielsen	Robert Award for Best Actor in a Leading Role; Nominated—Bodil Award for Best Actor in a Leading Role
2016	The Commune	Erik	Nominated—Bodil Award for Best Actor in a Leading Role; Nominated—Robert Award for Best Actor in a Leading Role
2016	In Embryo	Peter	Also director, writer, and executive producer
2017	Dræberne fra Nibe	Edward	
2017	Darling	Kristian	
2018	Gutterbee	—N/a	Director and writer. Post-production
2018	I Krig & Kærlighed	Müller	
2019	The Space Between the Lines	Bernhard Rothner	
2019	Gooseboy	Knud Heinesen	
2020	The Good Traitor	Henrik Kauffmann	
2020	Marco-effekten	Carl Mørck	
2022	Tag min hånd	Claes	
2022	A Violent Man	Governor Goodwillie	
2024	Den grænseløse		
2025	Dead Language	lighting designer	Israeli film
2025	Run	Matt	

=== Television ===
Key
†	Denotes television productions that have not yet been released

Year	Title	Role	Notes
1995	Mappen		Television film
1996	Charlot og Charlotte	Læge	1 episode: "Jeg så ind i dig"
1997	Bryggeren	Gartner Jørgensen	1 episode: "7. afsnit, 1862–1864"
1997	Deadline		Television film
1999	Naja fra Narjana	Far	Miniseries
1999	Dybt vand	Flygge	Television film
2000	Labyrinten	Dansk polisman	Miniseries
2003	Ins Leben zurück	Eric Lundgren	Television film
2005	Alias	Ulrich Kottor	1 Episode: "Tuesday"
2005	The Virgin Queen	Baron Casper Breuner	Miniseries (3 episodes)
2007	The Company	Starik Zhilov	Miniseries (2 episodes)
2009	Abducted	Dr. Albert Brand	Television film
2009	Blekingegade	Jørn Moos	Lead role
2011	Den som dræber	Martin Høeg	2 episodes
2011	Fringe	Man in Zeppelin / Mr X	1 episode: "Lysergic Acid Diethylamide"
2013–2016	Banshee	Kai Proctor	Series regular (37 episodes)
2014	In der Überzahl	Stig	Television film
2016	The Blacklist	Alexander Kirk / Constantin Rostov	Recurring role (10 episodes)
2017–2018	Counterpart	Aldrich	Recurring role (9 episodes)
2019	Forhøret	Bjørn Rasmussen	Lead role (8 episodes)
2020	The New Pope	Doctor Helmer Lindegard	Recurring role (4 episodes)
2022	Trom	Hannis Martinsson	Lead role (6 episodes); Golden Nymph Awards 2022 for Best Actor
2026	Lanterns	Thaal Sinestro	Recurring role; 4 episodes
TBA	Bishop †	TBA	Recurring role

=== Web series ===
Year	Title	Role	Notes
2013–2016	Banshee Origins	Kai Proctor	8 episodes
