= Election Night (1998 film) =

1998 film

- Film poster
- Directed by: Anders Thomas Jensen
- Written by: Anders Thomas Jensen
- Produced by: Kim Magnusson; Tivi Magnusson
- Starring: Ulrich Thomsen
- Cinematography: Jens Schlosser
- Edited by: Anders Villadsen
- Music by: Jeppe Kaas
- Production companies: M&M Productions
- Distributed by: Der KurzFilmVerleih
- Release date: 1998
- Running time: 11 minutes
- Country: Denmark
- Language: Danish

Election Night (Danish: Valgaften) is a 1998 Danish short comedy film directed by Anders Thomas Jensen. It won an Oscar in 1999 for Best Short Subject.

== Cast ==
- Ulrich Thomsen as Peter
- Jens Jørn Spottag as Carl
- John Martinus as Taxi Driver 2
- Ole Thestrup as Taxi Driver 1
- Farshad Kholghi as Taxi Driver 3
- Hella Joof as Woman
- Mikkel Vadsholt as Bartender
- Nicolas Bro as Man
- Thomas Milton Walther as Taxi Driver 4

== Plot summary ==
Peter arrives at a bar, forgetting that it is election day and that he forgot to vote. He takes a cab, but after the driver espouses racist views, he leaves and takes another. The new cab driver seems to be a Nazi, and Peter leaves again for another cab, but the driver, an immigrant who tells Peter that he will soon gain citizenship, espouses racism against Japanese people. Peter leaves the cab and encounters a man wearing a hat with the Confederate battle flag, asking Peter if he wants a ride. Peter runs to the polling place and does not make it in time. He tries convincing the poll worker, who is non-white, that he should be able to vote, telling the worker that he does it “for people like you”; a man subsequently punches Peter after perceiving him as racist.
