= Niels Skousen =

Danish composer (born 1944)

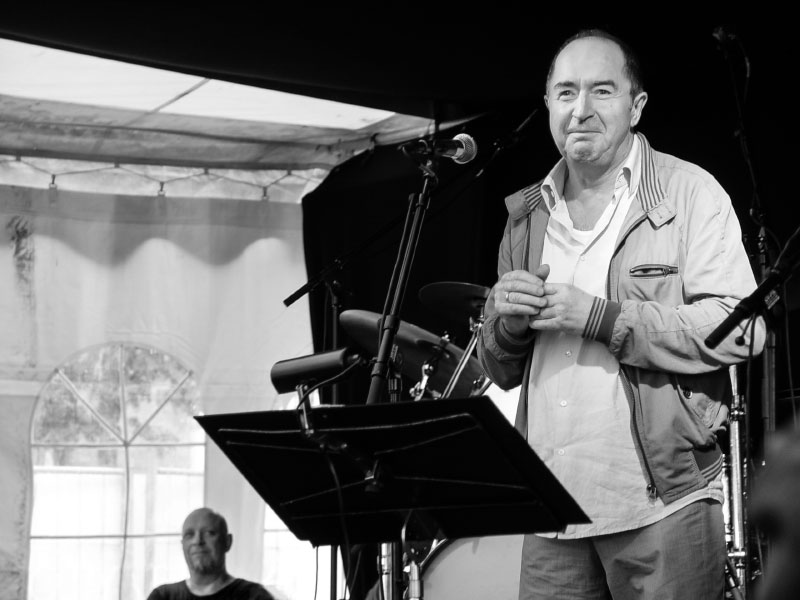
Aarhus Festuge 2008

Niels Skousen (born 28 January 1944 in Cologne, Germany) is a Danish composer, guitarist, actor, and poet. Niels Skousen is married to Linda Wendel (since 2003).

He started his musical career in 1964. After having heard the Bob Dylan album Another Side Of Bob Dylan, he started writing songs and learning to play guitar. His inspiration from Bob Dylan has lasted throughout his career. He started medical school but left it to pursue a career as a musician and actor. Niels Skousen made his record debut in 1971 with Herfra hvor vi står (Lyrics and music).

In 2023 he received the Dan Turèll Medaljen.

== Theaters ==
- Studenterscenen
- Secret Service, writer
- Solvognen, writer, and actor
- Skousens Rockteater
- Mammutteateret

== Bands ==
- Young Flowers
- Pan, singer
- Skousen & Ingemann
- Niels Skousen og band, Gert Smedegård, drums, Lennart Ginman, bass, Jonas Struck, guitar, Rune Kjeldsen, guitar and Niels Skousen, vocals and various instruments – February 2007.

== Discografi ==
Solo Records:

- Jeg vender mig i sengen, 1973
- Palads af Glas, 1976
- Landet Rundt, 1980
- Dobbeltsyn, 2002
- Daddy Longleg, 2006
- Lyt Til Din Coach, 2010
- Smil eller dø, 2014
- Døgnet Har 24 Timer, 2019
- Blæsten og regnen, 2022

With others:

- Skousen & Ingemann: Herfra hvor vi står, 1971;
- Skousen & Ingemann: Musikpatruljen, 1972;
- Skousen, Ingemann & Møller: Lykkehjulet, 1976;
- Solvognen, Elverhøj, Fandens sang, 1976
- Skousen & Ingemann: Forbryderalbum, 1978;
- Natlægen (Niels Skousen, Troels Trier, Erik Clausen and others), 1979
- Diverse kunstnere: På danske læber, Miraklet, 2004
- Diverse kunstnere: Andersens Drømme, Tåbelige menneske (lyrics by Lars Frost, music by Nikolaj Nørlund), Brand (lyrics by Jørgen Leth, music by Nikolaj Nørlund), 2005
