= Bodil Jørgensen =

Danish actress (born 1961)

- Born: 3 March 1961 (age 65); Vejle, Denmark
- Occupation: Actress
- Years active: 1992–present
- Spouse(s): Henrik Sartou (m. 1995, divorced) Morten Søborg (m. 2005)
- Children: 3

Bodil Jørgensen (born 3 March 1961) is a Danish film actress born in Vejle. She is known for her roles in The Idiots (1998) and Nothing's All Bad (2010). Apart from multiple movies, she has also acted in numerous TV series like Badehotellet (2013–2022), Julefeber (2022) and Minkavlerne (2019–2023).

She has been married to Morten Søborg since 18 November 2005. They have one child. She was previously married to Henrik Sartou.

In 2000, she won the Best Actress award for her role as Bente in Fruen på Hamre in Festróia - Tróia International Film Festival. The Idiots, in which she starred, was entered into the 1998 Cannes Film Festival.

== Personal life ==
=== Tractor accident ===
On 18 June 2014, Jørgensen was severely injured while shooting for the film Far til fires vilde ferie on the island of Mandø. She fell off a tractor she was riding in the scene being filmed, and was crushed by it. Severe injuries to her ribs, pelvis and internal organs ensued, but she survived the accident.

== Selected filmography ==
- Planetens spejle (1992) - Videnskabskvinden (Scientist)
- Russian Pizza Blues (1992)
- Alletiders nisse (1995, TV Series) - Bibliotekar
- Kun en pige (1995) - Gudrun
- Sunes familie (1997) - Sygeplejerske
- Nonnebørn (1997) - Søster Augustina / Sister Augustina
- Strisser på Samsø (1997–1998, TV Series) - Bodega-Bodil
- Idioterne (1998) - Karen
- Klinkevals (1999) - Josephine
- Juliane (2000) - Josephine
- Fruen på Hamre (2000) - Bente
- Send mere slik (2001) - Lissi Grise Knud
- At klappe med een hånd (2001) - Enke
- De Grønne Slagtere (2003) - Tina
- Jesus & Josefine (2003, TV Series) - Jytte
- Silkevejen (2004) - Ellen - Christine's friend and Colleague
- Krøniken (2004–2006, TV Series) - Astrid Nørregaard
- Anklaget (2005) - Skolepsykolog
- Voksne mennesker (2005) - Gunvor
- Jul i Valhal (2005, TV Series) - Sif
- Der var engang en dreng (2006) - Karin fra kommunen
- Hjemve (2007) - Myrtle
- De unge år (2007) - Katrine Bonfils
- Til døden os skiller (2007) - Nurse
- Frode og alle de andre rødder (2008) - Fru Rask
- Album (2008, TV Series) - Musse Rolsted
- Terribly Happy (2008) - Bartender
- Troubled Water (2008) - Dansk Kone
- Se min kjole (2009) - Mor
- Winnie og Karina - The Movie (2009) - Gerda
- Oldboys (2009) - Bente
- Karla og Jonas (2010) - Kattedame
- In a Better World (2010) - Rektor
- Nothing's All Bad (2010) - Ingeborg
- Jensen & Jensen (2011) - Fru Jensen (voice)
- Ronal the Barbarian (2011) - Bar Fairy (voice)
- This Life (2012) - Gudrun Fiil
- Gummi T (2012) - Fru Helmer / Gammel Dame (voice)
- Den skaldede frisør (2012) - Vibe
- Otto the Rhino (2013) - Fru Flora (voice)
- Badehotellet (2013–2021, TV Series) - Molly Andersen
- Far til fire - Onkel Sofus vender tilbage (2014) - Fru Sejersen
- A Second Chance (2014) - Retsmediciner
- Serena (2014) - Mrs. Sloan
- All Inclusive (2014) - Lise
- Men & Chicken (2015) - Ellen
- People Get Eaten (2015) - Ingelise
- Albert (2015) - Tahira (voice)
- Parents (2016) - Vibeke / mother
- Den magiske juleæske (2016) - Inger (voice)
- Aldrig mere i morgen (2017) - Englen
- Vitello (2018) - Georgine Dame (voice)
- Kollision (2019) - Elin
- Into the Darkness (2020) - Eva Skov
- Persona Non Grata (2021) - Jane
- Riget: Exodus - Karen Svensson
- Into the Darkness 2 (2022) - Eva Skov
- The Quiet Migration (2023) - Karen
- Rom (2024) - Gerda

== Awards and nominations ==
Year	Award	Category	Work	Result
1999	Bodil Award	Best Actress in a Leading Role	Idioterne	Won
2013	Bodil Award	Best Actress in a Leading Role	Hvidstengruppen	Nominated
2015	Bodil Award	Best Actress in a Leading Role	All Inclusive	Nominated
2015	Robert Awards	Best Actress in a Leading Role	All Inclusive	Won
2016	Bodil Award	Best Actress in a Leading Role	Mennesker bliver spist	Nominated
2017	Bodil Award	Best Actress in a Leading Role	Parents	Nominated
2022	Bodil Award	Best Actress in a Supporting Role	Persona Non Grata	Nominated
2023	Robert Awards	Best Actress in a Leading Television Role	Riget: Exodus	Nominated
2024	Robert Awards	Best Actress In a Supporting Role	The Quiet Migration	Nominated
