= Flickering Lights =

- DVD cover
- Directed by: Anders Thomas Jensen
- Written by: Anders Thomas Jensen
- Produced by: Kim Magnusson; Tivi Magnusson
- Starring: Søren Pilmark; Mads Mikkelsen; Ulrich Thomsen; Iben Hjejle; Nikolaj Lie Kaas
- Cinematography: Eric Kress
- Edited by: Anders Villadsen
- Music by: Bent Fabricius-Bjerre; Jeppe Kaas
- Production companies: M&M Productions
- Distributed by: Nordisk Film
- Release date: 2000
- Country: Denmark
- Language: Danish

Flickering Lights (Danish: Blinkende lygter) is a 2000 Danish black comedy crime film directed and written by Anders Thomas Jensen, and starring Søren Pilmark, Mads Mikkelsen, Ulrich Thomsen, Iben Hjejle, and Nikolaj Lie Kaas.

== Plot ==
Four small-time gangsters from Copenhagen trick a gangster boss: they steal over 4,000,000 Danish kroner which they were supposed to bring him. Trying to escape to Barcelona they are forced to stop in the countryside, in an old, wrecked house, hiding there for several weeks. Slowly, one after another, they realize that they would like to stay there, starting a new life, renovating the house and turning it into a restaurant. But their past eventually catches up with them.

== Cast ==
- Søren Pilmark as Torkild
- Ulrich Thomsen as Peter
- Mads Mikkelsen as Arne
- Nikolaj Lie Kaas as Stefan
- Sofie Gråbøl as Hanne (Stefan's girlfriend)
- Iben Hjejle as Therese (Torkild's girlfriend)
- Ole Thestrup as Alfred (Hunter)
- Frits Helmuth as Carl (Doctor)
- Peter Andersson as The Faroese
- Niels Anders Thorn as William
- Henning Jensen as Peter's Father
- Solbjørg Højfeldt as Peter's Mother
- Thomas Bo Larsen as Burglar

== Accolades ==
- Robert Festival 2001:

Audience Award
Best Cinematography
