= Adam's Apples =

2005 film

- Theatrical poster
- Directed by: Anders Thomas Jensen
- Written by: Anders Thomas Jensen
- Produced by: Mie Andreasen; Tivi Magnusson
- Starring: Ulrich Thomsen; Mads Mikkelsen; Paprika Steen; Ole Thestrup; Ali Kazim; Nicolas Bro
- Edited by: Anders Villadsen
- Music by: Jeppe Kaas
- Production companies: M&M Productions; August Film & TV GmbH; DR
- Distributed by: Nordisk Film (Denmark); Delphi Filmverleih Produktion (Germany)
- Release dates: 15 April 2005 (Denmark); 31 August 2006 (Germany)
- Running time: 94 minutes
- Countries: Denmark; Germany
- Language: Danish
- Box office: $2.4 million

Adam's Apples (Danish: Adams Æbler) is a 2005 Danish-language black comedy-drama film directed and written by Anders Thomas Jensen. The film revolves around the theme of the Book of Job. The main roles are played by Ulrich Thomsen and Mads Mikkelsen.

== Plot ==
Neo-Nazi gang leader Adam is granted parole from prison for participating in a rehabilitation program, where he joins the aggressive Saudi gas station robber Khalid and the kleptomaniac rapist Gunnar. The community is headed by the priest Ivan, who believes firmly and blindly in the goodness of man, and is seemingly oblivious to the ongoing misconduct and aggression of his charges.

Ivan tells Adam to choose a goal for himself to complete his rehabilitation. Trying to mock the priest, Adam chooses the goal of baking an apple pie. Ivan accepts, but stipulates that making the pie includes grooming and harvesting the churchyard apple tree. Adam is loath to complete his task, especially because at first crows attack the apples, and later most of those that remain are eaten by worms. The misanthropic Nazi is especially irritated by Ivan's joyful manner, excessive optimism and extreme forgiveness, and he sets it as his personal goal to break the priest's spirit and crush his faith.

Adam discovers that Ivan's life has been very difficult. Growing up as a victim of child abuse, he has terminal brain cancer, and is the widowed father of a severely disabled child. The cynical village doctor theorizes that Ivan discounts reality and sees all problems as tests from the devil, because his real life would be otherwise nearly impossible to bear. Adam psychologically attacks the priest by quoting the Book of Job, reasoning that it is God who hates the priest, not the devil. Ivan finally breaks down and renounces his faith.

Adam is gleeful at first, but soon realizes that without Ivan's influence, Khalid and Gunnar revert quickly to their criminal habits, and starts realizing the positive impact the priest had made. When several members of Adam's neo-Nazi gang visit the church and confront Khalid for earlier having shot two of their members, Ivan comes out of the church and demands to be allowed to die in peace. A scuffle ensues and the leader of the neo-Nazis accidentally shoots the priest in the eye.

At the hospital, the doctor predicts Ivan will be dead by morning. Suddenly guilt-stricken, Adam stays up all night baking a tiny, one-apple pie for Ivan, using the single apple surviving the sequential mishaps that happened to the apple-tree throughout the film. When he arrives at the hospital, he finds that Ivan's bed is empty. He goes to find Ivan's doctor, who tells him that the priest is in the garden – the bullet that hit him has neatly removed the tumour that plagued him.

In an epilogue, Adam remains at the church as an assistant to Ivan, and Ivan and Adam welcome two similarly troubled men recently released from prison.

== Cast ==
- Ulrich Thomsen as Adam Pedersen
- Mads Mikkelsen as Ivan Fjeldsted
- Nicolas Bro as Gunnar
- Paprika Steen as Sarah Svendsen
- Ali Kazim as Khalid
- Ole Thestrup as Dr. Kolberg
- Nikolaj Lie Kaas as Holger
- Gyrd Løfquist as Poul Nordkap
- Lars Ranthe as Esben
- Peter Reichhardt as Nalle
- Tomas Villum Jensen as Arne
- Peter Lambert as Jørgen

== Reception ==
The film holds a score of 70% positive reviews on a review aggregator site Rotten Tomatoes with the average score of 6.3/10, based on 37 reviews, with critical consensus being: "Good and evil collide with interesting results in Adam's Apples, a dark Biblical allegory that's alternately funny and shocking." On another review aggregator site Metacritic, the film scored 51 out of 100, based on 12 reviews.
