= Anders Thomas Jensen =

Danish screenwriter and director (born 1972)

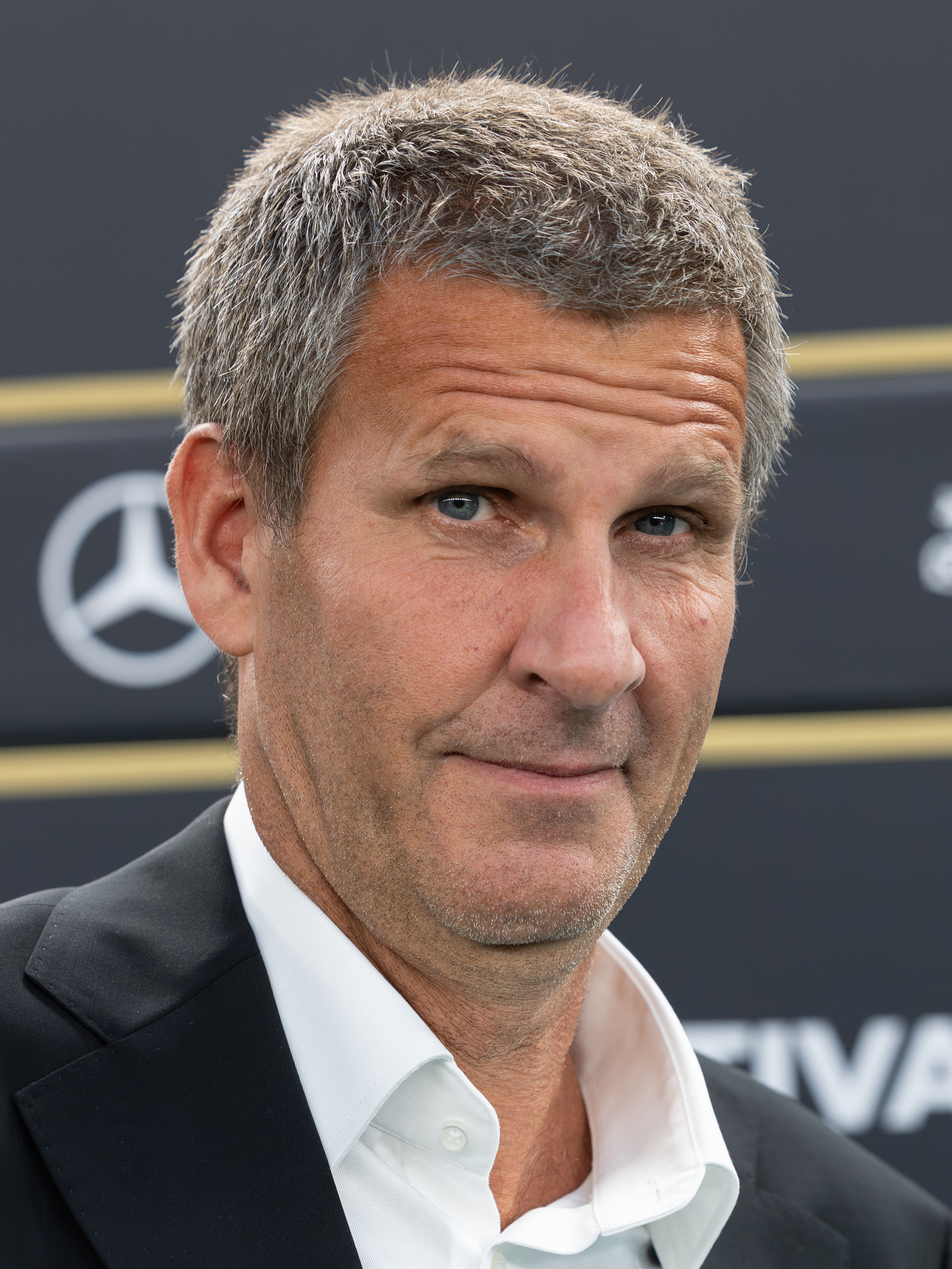
- Anders Thomas Jensen on the Green Carpet at the 2025 Zurich Film Festival
- Born: 6 April 1972 (age 54); Frederiksværk, Denmark
- Occupations: Film director, screenwriter
- Spouse: Line Kruse

Anders Thomas Jensen (born 6 April 1972) is a Danish screenwriter and film director. His film Election Night won the 1998 Academy Award for Best Live Action Short Film. He went on to direct the films Flickering Lights (2000), The Green Butchers (2003), Adam's Apples (2005), Riders of Justice (2020) and The Last Viking (2025).

== Early life and education ==
Anders Thomas Jensen was born on 6 April 1972 was born in Frederiksværk, Denmark.

== Career ==
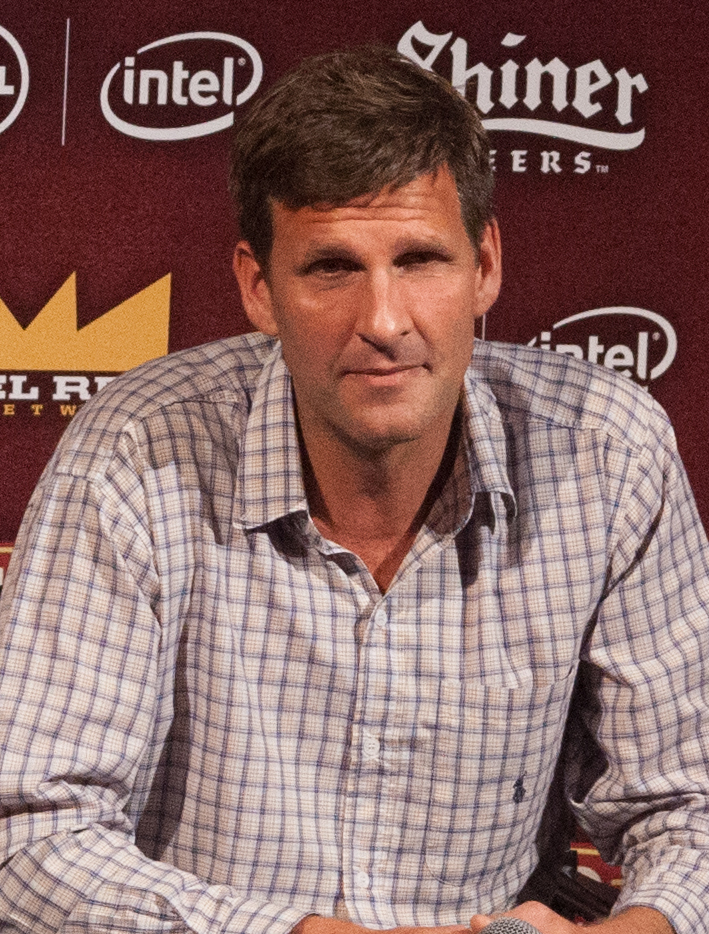
Jensen in 2015

Jensen won the Oscar for Best Short Subject for his 1998 film Election Night. He received Oscar nominations in the live-action short category for his films Ernst & Lyset (1996) and Wolfgang (1997). He also wrote the script for After the Wedding which was nominated for an Oscar as Best Foreign film in 2007, The New Tenants, which won the 2009 Oscar for Best Live Action Short and In a Better World which won the Oscar for Best Foreign film in 2011 and the Golden Globe for Best Foreign film.

From the end of the 1990s and into the new millennium he wrote the screenplays for most of the Danish movie blockbusters of the period, including Mifune's Last Song (co-written with Søren Kragh-Jacobsen), In China They Eat Dogs, Open Hearts, Stealing Rembrandt, and Brothers.

In 2000 Anders Thomas Jensen for the first time directed a feature film: the action-comedy Flickering Lights, and since then directed The Green Butchers, Adam's Apples, Men & Chicken, Riders of Justice, and The Last Viking.

Jensen co-wrote the film The Dark Tower with Nikolaj Arcel, Akiva Goldsman, and Jeff Pinkner, based on the Stephen King series. It was Jensen's first work on an American screenplay.

== Recognition and awards ==
American film theorist and film historian David Bordwell wrote in a 2007 article: "we can now speak of the Jensen touch -- a twinge of pathos acknowledged quietly, relying on our sympathy for the characters' bizarre frailties".

In 2024, Jensen was awarded the Ballings Særpris (Special Prize) at the Isbjørnen, by Nordisk Film Foundation. The prize commemorated the 100th birthday of Danish filmmaker Erik Balling.

== Personal life ==
Jensen married actress Line Kruse in 2008.

== Filmography ==
Year	Film			
Year	Film	Director	Writer	Notes
1996	Restless Heart	No	Yes	Short film
1996	Ernst og lyset	Yes	Yes	Short film
1996	Davids bog	No	Yes	Short film
1996	Café Hector	No	Yes	Short film
1996	De nye lejere	No	Yes	Short film
1996	Ernst og lyset	No	Yes	Short film
1997	Wolfgang	Yes	Yes	Short film
1997	Royal Blues	No	No	Actor
1998	Election Night	Yes	Yes	Short film
1998	Nøglebørn	No	Yes	
1998	On Our Own	No	No	Script consultant
1998	Babyboom	No	Yes	
1998	Albert	No	Yes	
1999	En sjælden fugl	No	Yes	Short film
1999	The Funeral	No	Yes	
1999	Mifune	No	Yes	
1999	In China They Eat Dogs	No	Yes	
2000	Zacharias Carl Borg	No	Yes	
2000	The King is Alive	No	Yes	
2000	Beyond	No	Yes	
2000	Flickering Lights	Yes	Yes	
2001	Count Axel	No	Yes	
2001	Shake It All About	No	No	Actor
2001	Chop Chop	No	No	Dialogue contributor
2002	Old Men in New Cars	No	Yes	
2002	Open Hearts	No	Yes	
2002	Wilbur Wants to Kill Himself	No	Yes	
2003	The Green Butchers	Yes	Yes	
2003	Skagerrak	No	Yes	
2003	Stealing Rembrandt	No	Yes	
2004	Brothers	No	Yes	
2005	Dear Wendy	No	No	Script consultant
2005	The Sun King	No	Yes	
2005	Adam's Apples	Yes	Yes	
2005	Murk	No	Yes	
2006	After the Wedding	No	Yes	
2006	Red Road	No	No	Characters
2006	Clash of Egos	No	Yes	
2007	With Your Permission	No	Yes	
2007	White Night	No	Yes	
2008	The Duchess	No	Yes	
2008	Fear Me Not	No	Yes	
2009	At World's End	No	Yes	
2009	Antichrist	No	No	Story supervisor
2010	In a Better World	No	Yes	
2010	Donkeys	No	No	Characters
2012	Love Is All You Need	No	Yes	
2013	All for Two	No	Yes	
2014	The Salvation	No	Yes	
2014	A Second Chance	No	Yes	
2015	Men & Chicken	Yes	Yes	
2015	The Shamer's Daughter	No	Yes	
2015	Mennesker bliver spist	No	No	Script consultant
2015	Land of Mine	No	No	Script consultant
2017	The Dark Tower	No	Yes	
2017	Veni Vidi Vici	No	No	TV series, script consultant
2019	Daniel	No	Yes	
2020	Abbi Fede	No	Yes	
2020	Riders of Justice	Yes	Yes	
2023	The Promised Land	No	Yes	
2025	The Last Viking	Yes	Yes	
