= Department Q =

Series of novels by Jussi Adler-Olsen

- The American first-edition cover of The Keeper of Lost Causes, the first book in the series
- Author: Jussi Adler-Olsen
- Original title: Danish: Afdeling Q
- Country: Denmark
- Language: Danish language
- Genre: Nordic noir
- No. of books: 10

Department Q (Danish: Afdeling Q) is a series of eleven Danish Nordic noir crime novels by author Jussi Adler-Olsen which have been adapted in an ongoing series of highly successful Danish films and a Scottish television adaptation for Netflix.

== Novels ==
Originally written in Danish, the novels have been translated into numerous languages, including English, Bulgarian, Chinese, Croatian, Czech, Dutch, Estonian, Finnish, French, German, Greek, Hebrew, Hungarian, Icelandic, Italian, Japanese, Latvian, Lithuanian, Macedonian, Norwegian, Polish, Portuguese, Romanian, Russian, Slovak, Slovene, Spanish, Swedish, Turkish and Vietnamese.

Despite using the same translations, the Penguin Group titled the first five novels differently in the United Kingdom and the United States. Their editions use the same British titles as the film adaptations.

Novel	Original title	Year	Film adaptation	Year
Mercy	Kvinden i buret	2007; 2011 (USA & UK)	The Keeper of Lost Causes	2013
Disgrace	Fasandræberne	2008; 2012 (USA & UK)	The Absent One	2014
Redemption	Flaskepost fra P	2009; 2013 (USA & UK)	A Conspiracy of Faith	2016
Guilty	Journal 64	2010; 2013 (USA); 2014 (UK)	The Purity of Vengeance	2018
Buried	Marco Effekten	2012; 2014 (USA & UK)	The Marco Effect	2021
The Hanging Girl	Den Grænseløse	2014; 2015 (USA & UK)	Boundless	2024
The Scarred Woman	Selfies	2016; 2017 (USA & UK)		
Victim 2117	Offer 2117	2019; 2020 (USA & UK)		
The Shadow Murders	Natrium Chlorid	2021; 2022 (USA & UK)		
Locked In	Syv m2 med Lås	2021; 2022 (USA & UK)		

== Adaptations ==
=== Films ===
- The Keeper of Lost Causes (2013)
- The Absent One (2014)
- A Conspiracy of Faith (2016)
- The Purity of Vengeance (2018)
- The Marco Effect (2021)
- Boundless (2024)

Upcoming

- The Scarred Woman (2026)
- Victim 2117 (2028)
- The Shadow Murders (2030)
- Locked In (2032)

The first four films were produced by Peter Aalbæk Jensen and Louise Vesth through Zentropa. But despite their commercial and critical success, author Jussi Adler-Olsen was unhappy with the results and the casting, feeling that the films and characters departed from his novels too much and that his suggestions were being ignored, leading to Nordisk Film (who had already distributed the prior films in Denmark) and producer Mikael Rieks taking over for the remainder of the series with all new castings.

=== Television series ===
In April 2023, it was announced that an English-language adaptation of the books would be adapted for the streaming service Netflix by filmmaker Scott Frank. Frank first acquired the US television rights for the novels in 2014 and initially planned to set the series in Boston, Massachusetts instead of Denmark. The nine-part series was produced by Left Bank Pictures and Sony Pictures Television with the setting finally being Scotland and filming taking place in Edinburgh. Frank is showrunner and also co-wrote the series alongside Chandni Lakhani, Stephen Greenhorn and Colette Kane. Filming began in Edinburgh in February 2024, with Matthew Goode in the lead role of Carl Morck (renamed from Mørck), Alexej Manvelov as Akram Salim (renamed from Hafez el-Assad), Leah Byrne as Rose, Chloe Pirrie as Merritt Lingard (renamed from Merete Lynggaard) and Kelly Macdonald as Dr. Rachel Irving (renamed from Mona Ibsen). The series premiered on Netflix in May 2025 and was renewed for a second series in August 2025.

=== Cast and characters ===
Character (🇩🇰/🇬🇧)	Films											Series
Character (🇩🇰/🇬🇧)	The Keeper of Lost Causes	The Absent One	A Conspiracy of Faith	The Purity of Vengeance	The Marco Effect	Boundless	The Scarred Woman	Victim 2117	The Shadow Murders	Locked In	Dead Souls Don't Sing	Dept. Q
Character (🇩🇰/🇬🇧)	2013	2014	2016	2018	2021	2024	2026	2028	2030	2032	2034	2025
Carl Mørck Carl Morck	Nikolaj Lie Kaas	Nikolaj Lie Kaas	Nikolaj Lie Kaas	Nikolaj Lie Kaas	Ulrich Thomsen	Ulrich Thomsen	Ulrich Thomsen	Ulrich Thomsen	Ulrich Thomsen	Ulrich Thomsen	Ulrich Thomsen	Matthew Goode
Hafez el-Assad Akram Salim	Fares Fares	Fares Fares	Fares Fares	Fares Fares	Zaki Youssef	Afshin Firouzi	Afshin Firouzi	Afshin Firouzi	Afshin Firouzi	Afshin Firouzi	Afshin Firouzi	Alexej Manvelov
Rose Knudsen Rose Dickson		Johanne Louise Schmidt	Johanne Louise Schmidt	Johanne Louise Schmidt	Sofie Torp	Sofie Torp	Sofie Torp	Sofie Torp	Sofie Torp	Sofie Torp	Sofie Torp	Leah Byrne
Gordon					Mads Reuther	Mads Reuther	Mads Reuther	Mads Reuther	Mads Reuther	Mads Reuther	Mads Reuther	TBA
Marcus Jacobsen Moira Jacobson	Søren Pilmark	Søren Pilmark	Søren Pilmark	Søren Pilmark	Henrik Noél†	Henrik Noél†						Kate Dickie
Hardy Henningsen James Hardy	Troels Lyby				Thomas W. Gabrielsson							Jamie Sives
Mona Ibsen Rachel Irving					Lisa Carlehed	Lisa Carlehed	Lisa Carlehed	Lisa Carlehed	Lisa Carlehed	Lisa Carlehed	Lisa Carlehed	Kelly Macdonald
Merete Lynggaard Merritt Lingard	Sonja Richter											Chloe Pirrie

Zaki Youssef was unable to return as Assad after The Marco Effect due to having recently become a father and having other scheduling conflicts with the filming of Boundless, which started on 5 September 2022, half a year earlier than planned.

=== Crew ===
Film	The Keeper of Lost Causes (2013)	The Absent One (2014)	A Conspiracy of Faith (2016)	The Purity of Vengeance (2018)	The Marco Effect (2021)	Boundless (2024)
Director	Mikkel Nørgaard	Mikkel Nørgaard	Hans Petter Moland	Christoffer Boe	Martin Zandvliet	Ole Christian Madsen
Producer(s)	Peter Aalbæk Jensen; Louise Vesth	Peter Aalbæk Jensen; Louise Vesth	Peter Aalbæk Jensen; Louise Vesth	Peter Aalbæk Jensen; Louise Vesth	Mikael Rieks	Mikael Rieks; Malene Blenkov
Screenwriter(s)	Nikolaj Arcel	Nikolaj Arcel; Rasmus Heisterberg	Nikolaj Arcel	Nikolaj Arcel; Bo Hr. Hansen; Mikkel Nørgaard	Anders August; Thomas Porsager	Jakob Weis
Composer(s)	Patrik Andrén; Uno Helmersson; Johan Söderqvist	Patrik Andrén; Uno Helmersson; Johan Söderqvist	Nicklas Schmidt	Mikkel Maltha; Anthony Lledo	Sune Martin	Jonas Struck; Lasse Ziegler
Cinematographer	Eric Kress	Eric Kress	John Andreas Andersen	Jacob Møller	Aske Foss	Jørgen Johansson
Editor(s)	Morten Egholm; Martin Schade	Morten Egholm; Martin Schade	Olivier Bugge Coutté; Nicolaj Monberg	Janus Billeskov Jansen; My Thordal	Per K. Kirkegaard; Per Sandholt	Frederik Strunk; Nicolaj Monberg
Production company	Zentropa	Zentropa	Zentropa	Zentropa	Nordisk Film	Nordisk Film
Distribution	Nordisk Film	Nordisk Film	Nordisk Film	Nordisk Film	Nordisk Film	Nordisk Film
Runtime	96 minutes	119 minutes	112 minutes	119 minutes	125 minutes	126 minutes
Release date	October 3, 2013	October 2, 2014	March 3, 2016	October 4, 2018	May 27, 2021	February 1, 2024

=== Reception ===
==== Box office performance ====
Film	Release date	Box office gross (Denmark)	Attendance (Denmark)	Box office ranking (Danish films)	Budget
The Keeper of Lost Causes	October 3, 2013	DKK 59,010,000	721,256	#5	€5,000,000
The Absent One	October 2, 2014	DKK 68,100,000	764,002	#2	€5,200,000
A Conspiracy of Faith	March 3, 2016	DKK 64,300,000	704,971	#4	€5,300,000
The Purity of Vengeance	October 4, 2018	DKK 72,500,000	765,111	#1	€5,200,000
The Marco Effect	May 27, 2021	DKK 23,300,000	225,243	N/A	€7,400,000
Boundless	February 1, 2024	TBA	301,800	TBA	€6,900,000
Total		DKK 287,210,000	3,482,383		€35,000,000
Average		DKK 57,442,000	580,397		€5,830,000

The films have been massively successful, selling over three million tickets in Denmark alone, where the installments regularly top the yearly box-office. The Purity of Vengeance (2018) became the highest grossing Danish film of all time upon release, with a gross of 72,500,000 DKK, The Absent One (2014) the second highest with 68,1 M. DKK, A Conspiracy of Faith (2016) the fourth with 64,3 M. DKK, and The Keeper of Lost Causes (2012) the fifth with 59,01 M. DKK. The Purity of Vengeance is additionally the 11th overall highest grossing film in Denmark. The fifth film The Marco Effect however, which marked a complete recast, was significantly less successful despite a larger budget. The sixth film, Boundless, had the best opening for a Danish film since Checkered Ninja 2 in 2021, three years prior, and is currently the most watched film of 2024 in Danish cinemas.

==== Critical response ====
Film	Rotten Tomatoes	Metacritic	Kino.dk
The Keeper of Lost Causes	71% (28 reviews)	62 (8 reviews)	4.2/6 (7 reviews)
The Absent One	92% (12 reviews)	61 (6 reviews)	3.5/6 (7 reviews)
A Conspiracy of Faith	100% (6 reviews)	75 (3 reviews)	3.7/6 (7 reviews)
The Purity of Vengeance	66% (3 reviews)	N/A	4/6 (7 reviews)
The Marco Effect	N/A	N/A	3.5/6 (8 reviews)
Boundless	N/A	N/A	4/6 (7 reviews)
