= 58th Bodil Awards =

2005 Danish film awards ceremony

- Date: 27 February 2005
- Site: Imperial Cinema, Copenhagen
- Hosted by: Michael Carøe

Highlights
- Best Film: King's Game
- Best Actor: Mads Mikkelsen; Pusher II
- Best Actress: Connie Nielsen; Brothers
- Most awards: King's Game (2)
- Most nominations: King's Game and Brothers (5)

The 58th Bodil Awards were held on 27 February 2005 at Imperial Cinema in Copenhagen, Denmark, honouring the best national and foreign films of 2004. Nikolaj Arcel's debut film King's Game and Susanne Bier's Brothers were both nominated for five awards. King's Game won the awards for Best Danish Film and Best Actor in a Supporting Role (Søren Pilmark) while Connie Nielsen won the award for Best Actress for her performance in Brothers. Mads Mikkelsen won the award for Best Actor for his performance in Pusher II.

== Winners ==
=== Best Danish Film ===
- King's Game
  - Brothers
  - In Your Hands
  - Pusher II
  - Terkel in Trouble

=== Best Actor in a Leading Role ===
- Mads Mikkelsen – Pusher II
  - Anders W. Berthelsen – King's Game
  - Nikolaj Lie Kaas – Brothers
  - Mikael Persbrandt – Day and Night
  - Ulrich Thomsen – Brothers

=== Best Actress in a Leading Role ===
- Connie Nielsen – Brothers
  - Lotte Andersen – Oh Happy Day
  - Sofie Gråbøl – Aftermath
  - Ann Eleonora Jørgensen – In Your Hands
  - Sonja Richter – Villa Paranoia

=== Best Actor in a Supporting Role ===
- Søren Pilmark – King's Game
  - Nicolas Bro – King's Game
  - Bent Mejding – Brothers
  - Leif Sylvester – Pusher II

=== Best Actress in a Supporting Role ===
- Trine Dyrholm – In Your Hands
  - Nastja Arcel – King's Game
  - Karen-Lise Mynster – Aftermath
  - Sonja Richter – In Your Hands
  - Pia Vieth – Familien Gregersen

=== Best Danish Documentary ===
- Tintin and I – Anders Østergård

=== Best Cinematography ===
- Morten Søborg – Pusher II and Brothers

=== Best American Film ===
- Lost in Translation
  - Before Sunset
  - Elephant
  - Eternal Sunshine of the Spotless Mind
  - Fahrenheit 9/11

=== Best Non-American Film ===
- Look at Me
  - Head-On
  - I'm Not Scared
  - Take My Eyes
  - The Return

=== Bodil Special Award ===
- Anders Refn

== See also ==
- 2005 Robert Awards
