= The Purity of Vengeance =

2018 Danish crime thriller film

- English-language promotional poster
- Danish: Journal 64
- Directed by: Christoffer Boe
- Based on: Journal 64 by Jussi Adler-Olsen
- Starring: Nikolaj Lie Kaas; Fares Fares
- Release date: 2018
- Country: Denmark
- Language: Danish

The Purity of Vengeance (Danish: Journal 64) is a 2018 Danish crime thriller directed by Christoffer Boe. It is based on the novel Journal 64 by Jussi Adler-Olsen. It is the fourth installment of the Department Q film series, after The Keeper of Lost Causes (2013), The Absent One (2014), and A Conspiracy of Faith (2016). Filming began on 16 January 2018 in Northern Germany. Other filming took place in Copenhagen and on Sprogø. As of November 2018 it was the highest-grossing Danish film ever.

== Plot ==
In 1961, teenage girl Nete meets her boyfriend Tage on the beach. They discuss Nete's pregnancy. Her father interrupts them, furious because the two are cousins. He puts her in the care of Nurse Gitte Charles, who takes her to a home for troubled girls on the island of Sprogø. There she meets the facility's doctor, Dr. Curt Wad.

In the present, Assad is disappointed in Mørck’s impersonal reference letter, in advance of his transfer to the fraud department. With one week left with Department Q, Mørck downplays their five-year friendship, and Assad leaves disgruntled. Meanwhile, Nour visits an OB/GYN clinic, where she receives an abortion. A construction crew breaks through a wall to find three mummified bodies tied up and seated at a dinner table. The three victims died of henbane overdoses and had their reproductive organs removed and placed in jars. Mørck, Assad, and Marcus discuss their suspicions of the still-missing property owner Gitte Charles. The two victims with legible ID are identified as Nete Hermansen and Philip Nørvig. Philip's disappearance was closed by Marcus twelve years ago after his wife said he ran off with another woman. The detectives tell Philip's wife Mie that he has been dead the entire time. Mie says she got an email from Philip saying he was leaving her for another woman; their son tracked the IP to Málaga. She also reveals that Philip worked as a defence attorney in a case related to Sprogø.

In 1961, Nete is assigned a roommate, Rita, who initiates her into life at Sprogø. The girls take henbane recreationally and Rita sexually assaults Nete. Rita later realises Nete is pregnant. They sneak out to meet a nearby fisherman. However, Rita betrays Nete to secure her release from the island. The fisherman begins to rape Nete. Dr. Wad and Gitte are ushered in by Rita. Wad attempts to rape a restrained Nete, but she bites his ear off. Nete is forcibly sterilised, and shortly after the Danish state closes Sprogø.

In the present, Rose identifies Rita as the last of the three victims. Rose also tells the detectives that Gitte had an address in Málaga. The Spanish police go to pick up Gitte, but she has fled. The detectives figure the main connection between the victims is Sprogø. They suspect Philip represented them in court, but cannot find records in the police archives. Mørck, Assad, and Rose meet Brandt, a paranoid caretaker for the abandoned facility. He gives them a tour and says many of the cases were decided in secret hearings. Mørck and Assad find record of a forced sterilisation case where Philip represented Dr. Curt Wad. Mørck and Assad interview Wad. Mørck and Assad again meet Brandt; he claims Wad is still sterilising women — specifically those from immigrant backgrounds — without their knowledge. Assad recognises Nour in a video Brandt shows them. A medical exam reveals Wad sterilised Nour. She is devastated, but refuses to lodge an official complaint. Wad tells his secret eugenicist society to close ranks. Mørck and Assad pick up Philip’s files, but the files are destroyed after a motorbike attack. Rose discovers Brandt’s body, and fights off an assailant. Suspecting Mørck is keeping something from him, Assad angrily declares they are no longer a team.

Mørck has figured out that it is not Gitte they are looking for, but Nete, who has taken revenge on people connected to Wad. He confronts an old woman getting off a bus; she pepper sprays him and gets away. A furious Nour goes to Wad’s clinic. Mørck follows Nete onto a ferry. They sit and drink tea laced with henbane. Mørck knows she killed Philip, Rita, and Gitte, and then stole Gitte's identity. He also figures the empty place setting was meant for Wad. Nete tells him she and Tage got back together for a bit after she was released from Sprogø, but she wasn't the same person anymore and he wanted children, so she left. Consumed by hatred, she started planning the murders after her case against Wad was rejected. Before she could kill Wad, Tage wanted to reconnect, so she sealed up the room and let go, living happily for twelve years until Tage's death. Mørck lets Nete leave; she has come to scatter Tage’s ashes in the Øresund.

Mørck gets a call requesting help at the clinic; Assad believes Nour is trapped there. An officer arrives, but he is also a member of Wad’s group. Assad finds Nour unconscious with Wad, and the officer shoots Assad. Wad plans to stage the crime scene as self-defence. A still-intoxicated Mørck arrives; he realises that the officer was the one he shot during the motorbike attack. They struggle; Mørck pushes him off a balcony. Nour wakes up enough to strike Wad, and Mørck calls for help.

Mørck stays by Assad’s bedside and admits what their partnership means to him. He asks him to come back to Department Q, and Assad accepts. Marcus announces the case to the press. Wad and his wife are arrested, and Nour speaks out about her experience.

== Cast ==
- Nikolaj Lie Kaas as Carl Mørck
- Fares Fares as Assad
- Johanne Louise Schmidt as Rose Knudsen
- Søren Pilmark as Marcus Jacobsen
- Fanny Leander Bornedal as Nete Hermansen (younger)
- Clara Rosager as Rita Nielsen: Nete's roommate at Sprogø
- Luise Skov as Nurse Gitte Charles
- Amanda Radeljak as Nour Turan: Assad's neighbour; secretly arranges an abortion to avoid telling her parents about her pregnancy
- Anders Hove as Dr. Curt Wad (older)
- Nicolas Bro as Brandt: paranoid caretaker of the abandoned Sprogø facility; obsessed with uncovering the eugenicist conspiracy as his aunt was sterilised at Sprogø and later killed herself
- Elliott Crosset Hove as Dr. Curt Wad (younger)
- Birthe Neumann as Nete Hermansen (older)
