= A Conspiracy of Faith =

- Theatrical release poster
- Danish: Flaskepost fra P
- Directed by: Hans Petter Moland
- Written by: Jussi Adler-Olsen
- Screenplay by: Nikolaj Arcel
- Produced by: Louise Vesth; Peter Aalbæk Jensen
- Starring: Nikolaj Lie Kaas; Fares Fares; Pål Sverre Hagen; Jacob Lohmann
- Cinematography: John Andreas Andersen
- Edited by: Olivier Bugge Coutte; Nicolaj Monberg
- Music by: Nicklas Schmidt
- Release date: 3 March 2016 (Denmark)

A Conspiracy of Faith (Danish: Flaskepost fra P), also known as Department Q: A Conspiracy of Faith, is a 2016 Danish crime thriller film, directed by Hans Petter Moland, based on a novel by Jussi Adler-Olsen. It is the third film in the Department Q series, after The Keeper of Lost Causes (2013) and The Absent One (2014).

== Synopsis ==
An 8-year-old message in a bottle, written in blood, leads Detective Carl Morck and his assistant Assad to a series of child abductions from religious communities throughout Denmark. The majority of these abductions have not been reported for some reason, and some of them are suspected to have ended in murder.

== Cast ==
- Nikolaj Lie Kaas as Carl Mørck
- Fares Fares as Assad
- Pål Sverre Hagen as Johannes
- Jacob Lohmann as Elias
- Amanda Collin as Rakel
- Johanne Louise Schmidt as Rose Knudsen
- Jakob Oftebro as Pasgård
- Søren Pilmark as Marcus Jacobsen
- Maria Rossing as Rebecca

== Reception ==
Ken Jaworowski of The New York Times praised the film's storyline construction, the mood, and the closing scene, 'beautifully blunt, ends it on the perfect note.'
