= Onwards and Sideways =

British comedy drama film

- Directed by: John Madden
- Screenplay by: Paul Mayhew-Archer
- Produced by: Hilary Bevan Jones; John Gore
- Starring: Laura Linney; Rhys Ifans; Monica Dolan; Rory Kinnear
- Cinematography: Danny Cohen
- Edited by: Úna Ní Dhonghaíle
- Music by: Thomas Newman
- Production companies: John Gore Studios; Hilltop Screen
- Distributed by: Icon Productions
- Release date: 10 September 2026 (TIFF)
- Running time: 115 minutes
- Country: United Kingdom
- Language: English

Onwards and Sideways is a 2026 British romantic drama film written by Paul Mayhew-Archer and directed by John Madden. It stars Rhys Ifans and Laura Linney, with Monica Dolan and Rory Kinnear in supporting roles.

The film’s screenwriter, Paul Mayhew-Archer, was diagnosed with Parkinson's disease in 2011 and has since become an advocate for research and awareness about the condition.

The film had its world premiere at the 2026 Toronto International Film Festival (TIFF) as a TIFF Gala Presentation.

== Premise ==
An English school teacher (Ifans) and an American composer (Linney) meet at a hospital after both are diagnosed with Parkinson's disease, having been told they have "five good years" left before the disease consumes them. The film follows their journey of managing the disease while maintaining their quality of life and continuing doing things that bring them joy.

== Cast ==
- Rhys Ifans as Tony Evans
- Laura Linney as Emma Dretzin
- Monica Dolan as Liz Evans, Tony's sister
- Rory Kinnear as Professor Ridge
- Leah Byrne as Julie
- Danielle Galligan
- Nicholas Asbury as Barry

== Production ==
The feature-length drama was announced in October 2025. It is produced for BBC iPlayer and BBC One by John Gore Studios and Hilltop Screen. It is written by Paul Mayhew-Archer and directed by John Madden. It is produced by Hilary Bevan Jones and John Gore. The executive producers are Hilary Strong, Francis Hopkinson, Ellie Wood, Helen Flint, Rhys Ifans, Madden, Mayhew-Archer and Lucy Richer.

Mayhew-Archer was diagnosed with Parkinson's disease in 2011, and is also co-host of the podcast Movers and Shakers about experiences with the disease. He also created the documentary, Parkinson's: The Funny Side in 2016.

The drama was initially written prior to the COVID-19 pandemic under the original title But When We Dance but was delayed in production.. It is set and filmed in North Norfolk, with locations including Fakenham. First-look images from filming released to the media in May 2026.

== Music ==
The film features an original score by Thomas Newman.

== Release ==
It had a world premiere at the 2026 Toronto International Film Festival (TIFF) in a TIFF Gala Presentation. The film was released in UK cinemas on 6 November 2026.

== Reception ==
Metacritic, which uses a weighted average, assigned the film a score of 71 out of 100, based on 8 critics, indicating "generally favorable reviews".
