= The Absent One (2014 film) =

2014 film

- Film poster
- Fasandræberne
- Directed by: Mikkel Nørgaard
- Screenplay by: Nikolaj Arcel; Rasmus Heisterberg
- Based on: The Absent One by Jussi Adler-Olsen
- Produced by: Peter Aalbæk Jensen; Louise Vesth
- Starring: Nikolaj Lie Kaas; Fares Fares; Pilou Asbæk; David Dencik; Danica Curcic
- Cinematography: Eric Kress
- Edited by: Morten Egholm; Frederik Strunk
- Music by: Patrik Andren; Uno Helmersson; Johan Soderqvist
- Production companies: Det Danske Filminstitut; Eurimages; Film Väst; TV2 Danmark; Zentropa Entertainments
- Distributed by: Nordisk Film Distribution (Denmark); Wild Bunch (France); NFP Marketing & Distribution (Germany)
- Release dates: 8 September 2014 (Austin Fantastic Fest); 2 October 2014 (Denmark)
- Running time: 120 minutes
- Countries: Denmark; France; Germany
- Languages: Danish; French
- Budget: €5.2 million

The Absent One (Danish: Fasandræberne), also known as Department Q: The Absent One, is a 2014 Danish crime mystery film directed by Mikkel Nørgaard and co-written by Nikolaj Arcel and Rasmus Heisterberg, based on Jussi Adler-Olsen's novel of the same name. It is the second film in the Department Q series following the 2013 film The Keeper of Lost Causes, and preceding the 2016 film A Conspiracy of Faith.

== Plot ==
The film opens with a flashback to the 1994 murder of twins Thomas and Marie at their summer house. In the present, their grieving father Henning Jørgensen, who is also a former police officer, puts together a box of files and goes out into a storm. Meanwhile, cold case detective Carl Mørck is encouraged by his assistant Assad to attend a police celebration thrown in honour of their department's success so he can meet Rose, their new secretary. Mørck leaves for a smoke, where Henning approaches him to ask him to look at the twins’ files. Mørck rebuffs him, but changes his mind after being called to the scene of Henning's suicide, where he finds the files set aside for Department Q.

Mørck and Assad begin their investigation, finding that the case was closed after local boy Bjarne Thøgersen confessed, claiming intoxication from mushrooms and cocaine. Despite his working-class origins, Bjarne was represented by prominent attorney Bent Krum and received a light sentence of five years. When questioned again, now living in apparent wealth, Bjarne remains evasive. Mørck and Assad doubt a single impaired assailant could have overpowered two athletic victims.

Flashbacks set at the elite Griffenholm Boarding School reveal that the murders were committed by a group that included Bjarne, wealthy students Ditlev Pram and Ulrik Dybbøl, and outsider Kirsten Marie “Kimmie” Lassen. Sent to the school by her stepmother after her father's death, Kimmie became romantically involved with Ditlev and participated in the clique's pattern of violent assaults on Sundays, their only day off, often in the nearby Fensmark Forest. Ditlev shows Kimmie his father's gun, and they make out, but are caught by Ditlev's prefect, Thomas. When he refuses to stay silent, the group assaults him. However, after Kimmie discovers she is pregnant, Ditlev rejects her.

The gang plans to take revenge on Thomas and Marie. They rape Marie. After Thomas unmasks them, Ulrik fatally stabs him. Kimmie begins an anonymous 112 call, but is interrupted and beaten by Ditlev and Ulrik, resulting in her unborn child's death.

In the present, Rose uncovers Kimmie's 112 call. Mørck and Assad visit Ditlev, now a successful businessman, and spot photos connecting him to Ulrik and Bent Krum. Ditlev and Ulrik, alerted to Department Q's investigation by the police commissioner, hire private investigator Aalbæk to track down and kill Kimmie, now a vagrant haunted by visions of her past crimes. Kimmie evades both Aalbæk and Department Q, striking Mørck in the head with a metal pipe during a pursuit. While Mørck recovers, hospital records reveal that Kimmie, severely beaten days after the murders, had fled medical care while still carrying a dead fetus.

The police commissioner — a Griffenholm alumnus — is identified as the source of the leaks. With renewed institutional support, Department Q pursues Kimmie, finding her squat and a mummified fetus in a purse. Aalbæk finds Kimmie, who kills him in self-defence. She confronts Ditlev but flees upon hearing sirens. She faces charges for Aalbæk's murder, while Bent is able to discredit her claims about the gang with old threatening letters she sent Ditlev.

Desperate to hold the perpetrators accountable, Mørck visits Kimmie in prison. She informs him of Ulrik's habit of collecting “trophies” from victims, such as jewellery, clothing, or hair. Mørck and Assad break into Ulrik's manor, discovering incriminating evidence in a hidden room. However, they are shot with tranquilizer darts and captured by Ditlev and Ulrik, who plan a staged accident. They are rescued by Kimmie. In a face-off at Ulrik's estate, Kimmie douses Ditlev in gasoline. After professing her love for him, she lights him on fire, before stepping into the flames. Assad saves Mørck.

The scandal erupts on the news, exposing Ditlev and Ulrik's crimes and suggesting Bent's complicity. Mørck goes home and reaches out to his estranged son.

== Cast ==
- Nikolaj Lie Kaas as Carl Mørck
- Fares Fares as Assad
- Pilou Asbæk as Ditlev Pram
  - Marco Ilsø as young Ditlev
- David Dencik as Ulrik Dybbøl
  - Philip Stilling as young Ulrik
- Danica Curcic as Kirsten Marie Larsen ("Kimmie")
  - Sarah-Sofie Boussnina as young Kimmie
- Johanne Louise Schmidt as Rose
- Beate Bille as Thelma
- Peter Christoffersen as Alberg
- Søren Pilmark as Marcus Jacobsen
- Michael Brostrup as Børge Bak
- Morten Kirkskov as Lars Bjørn
- Kristian Høgh Jeppesen as Bjarne Thøgersen
  - Adam Ild Rohweder as young Bjarne

== Release ==
When it was released in Oct 2014, it was Denmark's highest-grossing opening week ever for a domestic production.

Fares Fares, for his portrayal as Assad, received the Danish Robert Award for Best Actor in a Supporting Role. The film also received the Robert Audience Award.

== Reception ==
=== Critical response ===
On the review aggregator website Rotten Tomatoes, 92% of 12 critics' reviews are positive, with an average rating of 6.5/10.
