= Lauritzen Award =

Danish Film Award

The Lauritzen Award (Danish: Lauritzen-prisen) is a Danish film award which is handed every year to a female and a male Danish actor once a year by the Lauritzen Fonden.

The prize is currently 250,000 DDK to each recipient since 2010. The prize was established in 1965 as the Henkel-prisen (Henkel Award), which was given to a female actor from 1965 to 1995. From 1965 to 2000 the Lauritzen Award / the Henkel Award was 50,000 DDK, from 2001 to 2009 the prize was 150,000 DDK.

The recipients are chosen of a prize-commeettee, which currently consists of these members: Jens Ditlev Lauritzen, chair person, Lauritzen Fonden, Geir Sveaass, stage director, Piv Bernth, representing, DR-Culture, Poul Nesgaard, head of the Danish Film School (Den Danske Filmskole), Rikke Rottensten, editor and writer of theatrical reviews for Kristeligt Dagblad, Lars C. W. Wallenberg who writes theatrical reviews for Børsen, Kasper Wilton, head of the theater Folketeatret, Jan Lauritzen representing the Lauritzen family.

The Lauritzen Fonden currently hands five other film awards:

- Visionsprisen – 100,000 DDK is handed to an individual or organization or a group who had the courage to try something completely new and who had a strong artistical vision.
- Hædersprisen – 100,000 DDK is given to an experienced actor late in his or her glorious career in film, TV-series or on stage
- Backstage-prisen – 50,000 DDK is handed to a back-stage person in film, TV or TV-series
- Wauw-prisen – 30,000 DDK is handed to an experienced actor who plays in a non-expected kind of role.
- "Believe in You"-prisen – 20,000 DDK is handed to a young talented actor.

== Recipients of the Lauritzen Award ==
- 2024 – Birgitte Hjort Sørensen and Anders W. Berthelsen
- 2023 – Johanne Louise Schmidt and Lars Brygmann
- 2022 – Signe Egholm Olsen and Esben Smed
- 2021 – Anette Støvelbæk and Mikkel Boe Følsgaard
- 2020 – Postponed
- 2019 – Preben Kristensen and Maria Rossing
- 2018 – Inge Sofie Skovbo and Mads Mikkelsen
- 2017 – Danica Curcic and Ole Thestrup
- 2016 – Solbjørg Højfeldt and Jesper Christensen
- 2015 – Karen-Lise Mynster and Peter Plaugborg
- 2014 – Marianne Høgsbro and Thure Lindhardt
- 2013 – Birthe Neumann and Søren Malling
- 2012 – Sidse Babett Knudsen and Nikolaj Lie Kaas
- 2011 – Lene Maria Christensen and Ulf Pilgaard
- 2010 – Paprika Steen and Olaf Johannessen
- 2009 – Jesper Langberg and Ditte Hansen
- 2008 – Henning Jensen and Tina Gylling Mortensen
- 2007 – Bodil Jørgensen and Dejan Čukić
- 2006 – Meike Bahnsen and Janus Bakrawi
- 2005 – Jannie Faurschou and Nicolas Bro
- 2004 – Trine Dyrholm and Ole Lemmeke
- 2003 – Anne-Vibeke Mogensen and Søren Sætter-Lassen
- 2002 – Ann Eleonora Jørgensen and Lars Mikkelsen
- 2001 – Sofie Gråbøl and Jens Jørn Spottag
- 2000 – Birgitte Simonsen and Kim Veisgaard
- 1999 – Ellen Hillingsø and Aksel Erhardsen
- 1998 – Andrea Vagn Jensen and Frits Helmuth
- 1997 – Karen Wegener and Morten Kirkskov
- 1996 – Lisbeth Gajhede and Mikael Birkkjær
- 1995 – Jens Albinus and Søren Pilmark
- 1994 – Henning Moritzen
- 1993 – Jørgen Reenberg

== Recipients of the Henkel Award ==
- 1995 Charlotte Bøving
- 1994 Tammi Øst
- 1993 Annika Johannessen
- 1992 Kirsten Rolffes
- 1991 Benedikte Hansen
- 1990 Bodil Kjer
- 1990 Ditte Gråbøl
- 1989 Helle Hertz
- 1988 Kirsten Lehfeldt
- 1987 Lily Broberg
- 1986 Malene Schwartz
- 1985 Birthe Neumann
- 1984 Karen-Lise Mynster
- 1983 Lisbeth Dahl
- 1982 Berthe Quistgaard
- 1981 Stina Ekblad
- 1980 Ulla Henningsen
- 1979 Susse Wold
- 1978 Lise Ringheim
- 1977 Kirsten Olesen
- 1976 Ann-Mari Max Hansen
- 1976 Merete Volstedlund
- 1973 Birgitte Federspiel
- 1972 Astrid Villaume
- 1971 Ghita Nørby
- 1970 Bodil Udsen
- 1969 Birgitte Price
- 1968 Karin Nellemose
- 1967 Lone Hertz
- 1966 Lily Weiding
- 1965 Bodil Kjer
