= The Burning Sea =

- Directed by: John Andreas Andersen
- Written by: Lars Gudmestad; Harald Rosenløw Eeg
- Produced by: Catrin Gundersen; Martin Sundland
- Starring: Kristine Kujath Thorp; Rolf Kristian Larsen; Henrik Bjelland; Anders Baasmo; Bjørn Floberg; Nils Elias Olsen; Anneke von der Lippe
- Cinematography: Pål Ulvik Rokseth
- Edited by: Kalle Doniselli Gulbrandsen; Christian Siebenherz
- Music by: Johannes Ringen; Johan Söderqvist
- Production company: Fantefilm
- Distributed by: Magnolia Pictures
- Release dates: October 18, 2021 (Rome); October 29, 2021 (Norway); February 25, 2022 (United States)
- Running time: 104 minutes
- Country: Norway
- Language: Norwegian
- Box office: $4 million

The Burning Sea (also known as North Sea and The North Sea, Norwegian: Nordsjøen) is a 2021 Norwegian disaster drama film.

== Cast ==
- Kristine Kujath Thorp as Sofia
- Rolf Kristian Larsen as Arthur
- Henrik Bjelland as Stian
- Anders Baasmo as Ronny
- Bjørn Floberg as William Lie
- Nils Elias Olsen as Odin
- Anneke von der Lippe as Gunn Langlo
- Cengiz Al as Jasin
- Ane Skumsvoll as Berit
- Vidar Sandem as Sjefsgeolog
- Christoffer Staib as Steinar Skagemo

== Accolades ==
Award	Date of ceremony	Category	Recipient(s)	Result	Ref.
Amanda Award	20 August 2022	People's Amanda	The Burning Sea	Nominated	
Amanda Award	20 August 2022	Best Norwegian Film	The Burning Sea	Nominated	
Amanda Award	20 August 2022	Best Director	John Andreas Andersen	Nominated	
Amanda Award	20 August 2022	Best Actress	Kristine Kujath Thorp	Nominated	
Amanda Award	20 August 2022	Best Production Design	Jørgen Stangebye Larsen	Nominated	
Amanda Award	20 August 2022	Best Sound Design	Christian Schaanning	Nominated	
Amanda Award	20 August 2022	Best Visual Effects	Mats Andersen, Theodor Groeneboom, Morten Jacobsen, Lars Erik Hansen, Arne Kaupang	Won	
