= Dept. Q =

British crime television series (2025–present)

- Release poster
- Genre: Crime thriller
- Based on: Department Q by Jussi Adler-Olsen
- Developed by: Scott Frank; Chandni Lakhani
- Starring: Matthew Goode; Kelly Macdonald; Chloe Pirrie; Alexej Manvelov; Leah Byrne; Steven Miller; Mark Bonnar; Jamie Sives; Shirley Henderson; Kate Dickie
- Music by: Carlos Rafael Rivera
- Country of origin: United Kingdom
- Original language: English
- No. of series: 1
- No. of episodes: 9

Production
- Executive producers: Scott Frank; Andy Harries; Rob Bullock
- Producer: David Brown
- Cinematography: David Ungaro
- Running time: 42–71 minutes
- Production companies: Flitcraft; Left Bank Pictures; Sony Pictures Television

Original release
- Network: Netflix
- Release: 29 May 2025 – present

Dept. Q is a British crime thriller television series created by Scott Frank and Chandni Lakhani, based on the book series Department Q by Danish writer Jussi Adler-Olsen. It premiered on Netflix on 29 May 2025 and received positive reviews from critics. In August 2025, it was renewed for a second series.

== Premise ==
Top-rated Detective Chief Inspector Carl Morck is returning to police work, four months after he was badly wounded in an ambush shooting. His colleague and friend Detective Inspector James Hardy was also shot and paralysed, and a young uniformed police officer was killed. Morck receives a muted welcome since his colleagues generally hold him in low regard due to his arrogance and asociality. Morck is also required (against his will) to attend therapy sessions for the after-effects of the shooting.

The Scottish government has decided to temporarily concentrate on unsolved crimes, believing that successful outcomes will generate good headlines that improve public opinion regarding the police force. Morck's hard-pressed and under-resourced commander, Moira Jacobson, is offered a substantial budget to set up a new unsolved crimes unit. She instead diverts most of the budget to her own department and its current cases, then assigns Morck as the sole officer to deal with a large number of cold cases. Morck is directed to set up his department in Room Q, a semi-derelict room full of office junk in the basement—the former Shower Quarters of the police station, thus the "Q".

Civilian employee Akram Salim, an immigrant from Syria who had worked as "something like" a policeman in that country and who is looking for more challenging work, quietly insinuates himself into Morck's basement and is tasked with organising case files. While doing that, he suggests investigating the missing Crown Office solicitor Merritt Lingard. Joined by a recovering Hardy and young constable Rose Dickson, the misfit team begin looking into Lingard's disappearance – the main case investigated during the first season of the series.

== Cast ==
=== Main ===
- Matthew Goode as Detective Chief Inspector (DCI) Carl Morck, an emotionally scarred English detective who becomes the head of cold case unit Department Q
- Chloe Pirrie as Crown solicitor Merritt Lingard, a ruthless and ambitious prosecutor
  - Bobby Rainsbury as teenage Merritt Lingard
- Jamie Sives as Detective Inspector (DI) James Hardy, Morck's partially paralysed former partner who provides support to Department Q's investigation
- Alexej Manvelov as Akram Salim, a Syrian who worked in some unspecified investigative agency then fled to Europe, who becomes member of the department Q as a civilian employee
- Leah Byrne as Detective Constable (DC) Rose Dickson, a young female police detective shaken by a breakdown and looking for a chance to prove herself on Morck's team
- Kelly Macdonald as Dr Rachel Irving, a therapist handling Morck's mandatory post-shooting sessions
- Kate Dickie as Chief Superintendent Moira Jacobson, Morck's commanding officer
- Patrick Kennedy as Liam Taylor, a prosecutor who worked with Merritt
- Mark Bonnar as Stephen Burns, Lord Advocate and Merritt's former supervisor

=== Recurring ===
- Angus Yellowlees as Constable Anderson, a patrol officer in Edinburgh
- Douglas Russell as Graham Finch, a businessman accused of murdering his wife
- Ellen Bannerman as Kirsty Atkins, a witness in the Finch case
- Gordon Brown as former Detective Fergus Dunbar, who originally investigated the Merritt Lingard case
- Tom Bulpett as William Lingard, Merritt's disabled brother
- Clive Russell as Jamie Lingard, father of Merritt and William
- Shirley Henderson as Claire Marsh, a housekeeper and attendant of William
- Michelle Duncan as Dr. Fiona Wallace, the glamorous director of a mental hospital and William's court appointed legal guardian
- Alison Peebles as Ailsa Jennings, mother of Lyle and Harry Jennings
- Steven Miller as Lyle Jennings
  - Kai Alexander as teenage Lyle Jennings
- Fraser Saunders as Harry Jennings, Lyle's brother
- Gilly Gilchrist as Sergeant John Cunningham, a senior officer on Mhòr Island
- Angus Miller as Constable Colin Cunningham, John's son and an officer on Mhòr Island
- Aaron McVeigh as Jasper Stewart, Morck's stepson
- Sanjeev Kohli as Martin Fleming, Morck's lodger
- Jack Greenlees as Sam Haig, investigative reporter
- Kal Sabir as Detective Chief Inspector Logan Bruce, a senior CID officer in Edinburgh
- Aron Dochard as Detective Constable Clark, a CID officer in Edinburgh
- Catriona Stirling as Detective Constable Wilson, a CID officer in Edinburgh
- Mark Cox as Deputy Chief Constable Duncan Finley
- James Macnaughton as Dennis Piper, a reporter at The Scottish Telegraph

== Episodes ==
No.	Title	Directed by	Written by	Original release date
1	Episode 1	Scott Frank	Chandni Lakhani and Scott Frank	29 May 2025
At the Leith Park, Edinburgh home of a man found stabbed in the head, DCI Carl Morck, DI James Hardy, and patrol officer PC Anderson are ambushed by a masked gunman who shoots all three of them; Anderson is killed, James is paralysed and Carl is shot in the neck. Struggling with his wayward teenage stepson Jasper, the recovering but depressed James, and his own trauma and guilt from the shooting, Carl is forced to attend mandatory therapy sessions with Dr Rachel Irving, but finds little solace. Back at work, Carl immediately achieves progress in the stalled investigation of the shootings by DC Clark and DC Wilson, led by DCI Bruce. He is reminded by Chief Superintendent Moira Jacobson that he cannot investigate his own shooting and she relegates him to the police station's derelict basement area to establish a brand new cold case unit, "Department Q". Swamped by hundreds of cold cases to pick from, Carl begrudgingly accepts the assistance of Akram Salim, a civilian worker with police experience in his native Syria. Akram studiously reads each file, ultimately landing on the sudden 2020 disappearance of notorious advocate (prosecutor) Merritt Lingard, which he suggests they start with. Four years earlier: Ambitious lawyer Merritt lives with her non-verbal brother William, who is cared for day-to-day by their housekeeper Claire Marsh. As Merritt and her colleague Liam Taylor prosecute—ultimately unsuccessfully—businessman Graham Finch for the murder of his wife, Merritt receives anonymous threats and abuse via text messages and emails. She is last seen on board a car ferry with William. In the present day, Merritt is shown to be still alive, held captive for over four years inside a hyperbaric chamber by mysterious abductors at an unknown location.
2	Episode 2	Scott Frank	Chandni Lakhani and Scott Frank	29 May 2025
After discovering Jasper is skipping school to have sex with his girlfriend, Carl makes an embarrassing pass at Rachel during their session. Akram presents Merritt's case to Moira as Dept. Q's first assignment, and a skeptical Carl speaks to Fergus Dunbar, the former detective who handled the case when Merritt disappeared four years previously. Carl and Akram visit William's care facility but the director, Dr Fiona Wallace, refuses to let them see him. They interview Claire, who explains that William's disability resulted from a severe head injury and insists Merritt would never have willingly abandoned her brother. Carl confides in James about the case, and is also approached by Lord Advocate Stephen Burns, Merritt's former supervisor. Carl suffers a panic attack after Moira forces him to deliver a statement about the case at a press conference. Watching the statement on TV, a distressed William escapes from the facility and runs away into nearby woods. In the chamber, Merritt has covered the walls with names of those she successfully prosecuted in her career. Once a month, she is forced to guess on whose behalf her unseen abductors—a grandmotherly woman and a younger man in a distinctive cap—are seeking revenge. This time, she guesses Kirsty Atkins, an informant in the Finch case whom she failed to save from prison, but the captors laugh and inform Merritt that her answer is once again wrong.
3	Episode 3	Elisa Amoruso	Chandni Lakhani and Scott Frank	29 May 2025
Carl is chastised by Moira for missing his appointments with Rachel, who visits Dept. Q and opens up to Carl about her own failed marriage. Jasper tries to broker a gentlemen's agreement with Carl for the two of them to stay out of each other's way and move on from one another. Carl and Akram retrace Merritt and William's steps on the ferry to Mhór where they grew up, watched by the man in the cap. Local Police Constable Cunningham explains that William was savagely beaten and crippled during a robbery by Harry Jennings, who died shortly afterwards whilst trying to escape from the police. Carl and Akram interview William and Merritt's estranged father, Jamie, who despises his daughter for taking William away from him and also for stealing her late mother's necklace. Finding Merritt's former home ransacked and destroyed by squatters, William recovers one of his drawings before fleeing. Akram and Carl find William hiding in Claire's garden. Together with Claire, the three of them help William use his drawing to explain that he saw the man in the cap, not just on the ferry but also stalking Merritt at home previously. After reluctantly returning to Dr Wallace's facility, William tries to re-draw the man in the cap. James persuades Carl to give him a police laptop so that he can help on the case. Carl also reluctantly accepts desk-bound DC Rose Dickson into Dept. Q, completing the new team. He begins to suspect that Merritt's case was intentionally mishandled and buried. Threatened with sudden pressure changes, unbearable noise and explosive decompression, Merritt discovers an old message carved into the chamber wall: "L. H. Why are you here?"
4	Episode 4	Elisa Amoruso	Stephen Greenhorn and Scott Frank	29 May 2025
Carl deduces that the Leith Park gunman was lying in wait and must have had a getaway driver; he advances the investigation by giving the information to DC Wilson and DC Clark. Rachel is surprised to learn Carl agreed to sole custody of his stepson Jasper during his divorce. Victoria, Jasper's absentee mother and Carl's ex-wife, makes a fleeting visit, urging Carl to be a more understanding parent to his stepson, telling him that Jasper actually idolises and loves him. Afterwards, Carl lashes out at his lodger Martin. James advises Rose to delve deeper into Harry Jennings. At Mhòr, Rose charms Cunningham and his deputy and son Colin. She is unable to meet Harry's mother, but learns Merritt returned for Harry's funeral and took the necklace. A romantic note to Merritt from 'S', discovered in her files, leads Dept. Q to question her assistant Sabrine, as well as Stephen Burns. Merritt's colleague on the Finch case, Liam, admits he had an affair with Merritt but denies writing the note, and hotel records reveal the name of the man who last stayed with her there: Sam Haig. Four years earlier: After telling Sam she is going away, Merritt is assaulted and abducted on the car ferry by her two captors and imprisoned in the chamber. Her first guess as to who she wronged is Sam, but her captors declare that although she is responsible for his death, she is incorrect.
5	Episode 5	Elisa Amoruso	Stephen Greenhorn and Scott Frank	29 May 2025
Frustrated with Dept. Q's lack of progress, Moira suggests to Rachel that she step down and re-assign Carl to another therapist. Carl and Akram learn that Sam Haig was a secretive reporter covering organised crime who died in a climbing accident just one day before Merritt disappeared. Interviewing Sam's editor, Carl loses his temper with a pushy reporter and assaults him. James, undergoing promising rehabilitation treatment, discovers Merritt had access to her mother's share of her family’s considerable wealth, which passed to William in her absence. Carl confronts Dr Wallace for embezzling William's money and forcibly removes William from the home, placing him into Claire's care. Carl accuses Moira of being pressured to bury the initial investigation into Merritt's disappearance. A laundry receipt leads Rose and Akram to learn Merritt tried to apologise to Kirsty Atkins' family, so they interview the soon-to-be-paroled Kirsty; she knew Finch had abused his wife and had agreed to testify, but after Merritt suddenly reneged on the deal, Kirsty was brutally stabbed and almost murdered. Four years earlier: Burns obstructs Merritt from letting Kirsty testify, for spurious and vague reasons. After Kirsty is targeted in prison and nearly killed, a guilty Merritt reaches out to a reporter she has just met, Sam.
6	Episode 6	Scott Frank	Colette Kane and Scott Frank	29 May 2025
A suspect is arrested in the Leith Park shooting. Carl revisits the crime scene, deducing that the stabbing victim must have been an informant, and that PC Anderson in hindsight was behaving suspiciously. However, Carl is unable to conclusively identify the suspected shooter in a line-up. Carl is upset further to discover that Rachel is no longer his therapist. He calls Jasper to arrange a meeting in a cafe. Carl turns his attention to Finch, causing Fergus to be beaten and threatened against cooperating with the investigation. Jasper is then also threatened by a sinister and mysterious man in a cafe; Carl arrives and viciously beats the man in the street, but the incident is caught on video. Tracking down the getaway driver, Akram brutalises him into revealing he works as a chauffeur for a company owned by Finch. Liam is questioned again by Dept. Q about the Finch trial, leading to the realisation that Burns hindered the prosecution behind his back. James deduces that Finch had coerced Burns by menacing Burns' daughter. In the present, Merritt learns the chamber's airlock has broken whilst delivering her a meal. Four years earlier: Merritt has a clandestine meeting with Sam, who claims to be investigating corruption within the Crown Office. She arranges another meeting at a hotel, ostensibly to discuss Burns' interference in the Finch trial, and she and Sam have sex.
7	Episode 7	Scott Frank	Colette Kane and Scott Frank	29 May 2025
Carl begins to mend his relationship with the now frightened Jasper. He also drops in unannounced at Rachel's home, but leaves her irritated when he is unable to articulate a reason for visiting. Carl and Akram all but confirm that Burns was coerced by Finch into blocking Kirsty's testimony. They confront Finch at a golf club with incriminating text messages to his henchmen, conclusively proving that he ordered Kirsty to be killed. However, Finch denies having anything to do with Merritt or Sam, and Finch's lawyer claims that it was actually Sam that tipped them off about Kirsty's deal. The detectives learn from a journalist that Sam was once a violent juvenile offender who later tracked down someone he had attacked as a boy. Rose questions Paul Evans, the climbing instructor who discovered Sam's body, who reveals that Sam had had sex with his wife just before his death, but denies killing him. Whilst scrubbing the names from the chamber walls, Merritt recalls Harry Jennings; they were close as teenagers, despite her father's disapproval. After being given pliers to remove an infected tooth, she later uses them to sabotage the airlock mechanism during a meal delivery. The pressure smashes the hatch door into the female captor's face, knocking her out. Merritt attempts to escape and call the police, but is quickly recaptured by the man in the cap.
8	Episode 8	Scott Frank	Teleplay by : Scott Frank	29 May 2025
In a dream, Carl solves the Leith Park shooting and takes revenge, but wakes up no closer to actually solving it. He accosts Rachel during a cafe date to seek her advice. The Dept. Q team run out of steam, but are energised upon realising that the man known as Sam Haig by Merritt and the Sam known by Paul Evans were actually two different people. Akram and Carl visit the young offenders institution where Sam was sent; they discover that the boy Sam attacked was Lyle Jennings, Harry's younger brother. The man in the cap locks Merritt back in the chamber, but caresses her and quietly professes his love. He takes her mother's necklace, but later returns it. Merritt remembers how, as a teenager, she fantasised with Harry about stealing her mother's jewellery to escape Mhòr, only for him to actually carry out the robbery, attack William, and fall to his death. When her female captor demands a final guess, a desperate hint from the man in the cap leads Merritt to realise 'L' and 'H' were the Jennings brothers; the man in the cap is Lyle, and the woman is his mother Ailsa; they blame Merritt for Harry's death. Merritt goads them to kill her, causing a distressed Lyle to reveal himself to her as the man she knew as Sam Haig.
9	Episode 9	Scott Frank	Teleplay by : Scott Frank	29 May 2025
Video of the deeply disturbed Lyle's youth counselling sessions reveals that his unstable mother often locked her sons in the chamber. Cunningham, who always believed that Lyle killed Merritt, finds her and is furious to discover they have kept her in a hyperbaric chamber for four years. When Cunningham says he cannot 'look the other way', Lyle bludgeons him to death. Dept. Q questions William, who identifies Lyle both as his attacker and the man in the cap. A flashback shows that the real Sam finds Lyle to make amends for his boyhood attack in the young offenders facility, but some time later Lyle, who by then is posing as Sam when meeting Merritt, kills him and stages his death as a climbing accident. Lyle and his mother abandon Merritt in the chamber with rising pressure, but Carl and Akram return to Mhòr and search the Jennings' property. Finding Cunningham's body and the chamber, they are ambushed by Lyle; Carl is shot protecting Akram, who disarms and kills Lyle. Merritt is rescued and reunited with William, while Ailsa shoots herself when confronted in her car by police led by DCs Wilson and Clark as she flees the island on the ferry. Three months later: Carl uses his knowledge of Burns' coerced sabotage of the Finch trial as leverage to obtain increased funding for Dept. Q, a new car, and the appointment of Akram as an official detective. Carl meets Merritt, choosing not to reveal his identity to her. Rose has gained the respect of DCs Clark and Wilson; James returns to work, now ambulatory with the aid of crutches, as Moira considers assigning him to the still unsolved Leith Park shooting.

== Production ==
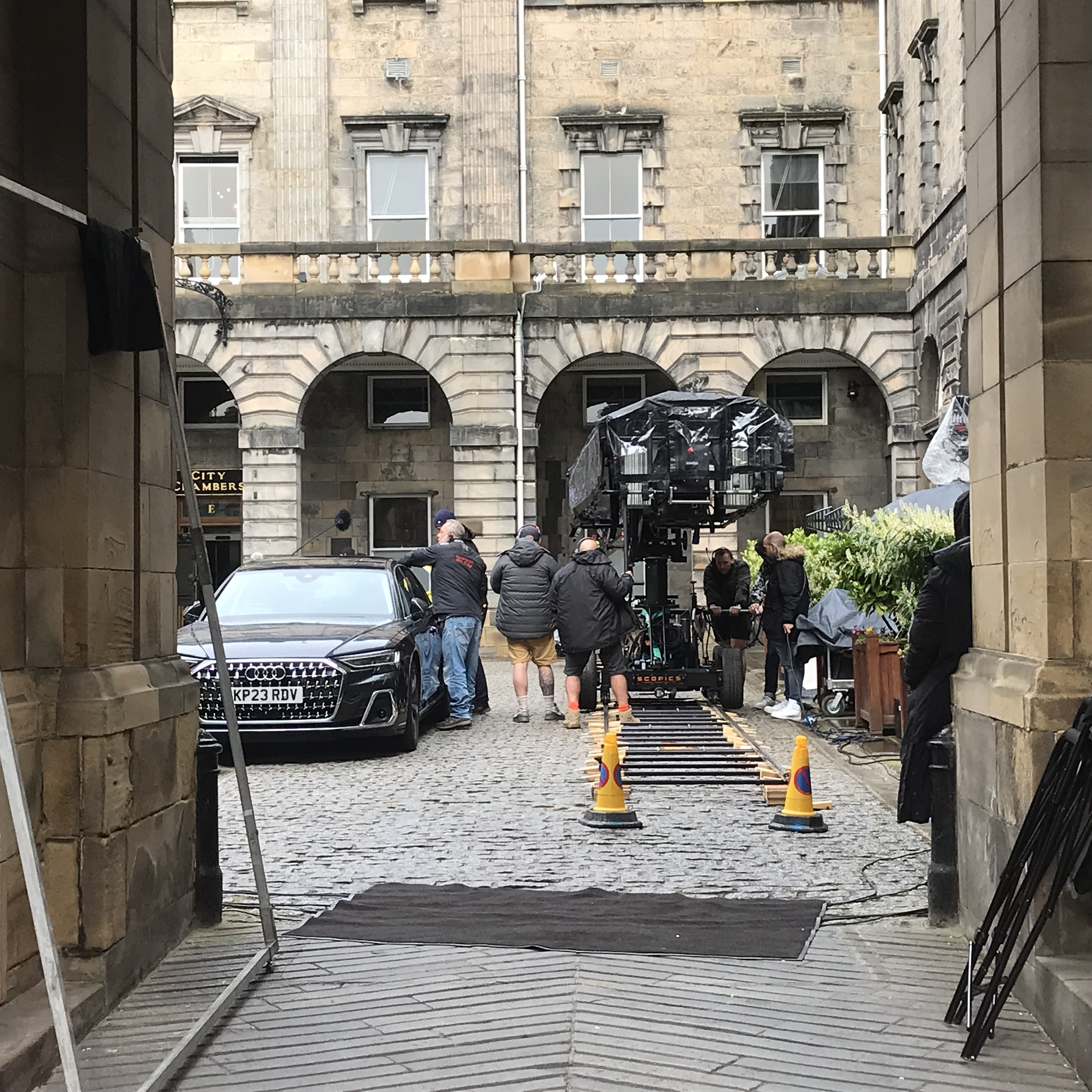
Filming took place at the City Chambers in Edinburgh

On 27 April 2023, Scott Frank was selected to develop an English-language eight-episode TV series adaptation of the first of Jussi Adler-Olsen's Department Q book series, with Frank co-writing with Chandni Lakhani, and Left Bank Pictures producing the series for Netflix. On 6 February 2024, Stephen Greenhorn and Colette Kane were revealed to be writing with Frank and Lakhani, with Frank directing the first two episodes. In August 2025, the series was renewed for a second season.

On 27 April 2023, it was announced that the series would be set in Edinburgh, Scotland, as opposed to the Copenhagen, Denmark setting of the source material. Filming took place in Edinburgh between February and June 2024. Scenes for the Jennings property were filmed at Burntisland Docks in Fife, although set on the fictional island of Mhòr. The police station scenes featured Argyle House.

In April 2026, it was announced that filming for the second season would run from July to December of that year, with no date given for its 2027 release. Parts of the second series were shot in Aberdeen, as well as Edinburgh.

In June 2026, Aisling Franciosi, Greg Wise, Nicholas Rowe, Tony Curran, Hamish Clark, Alex Ferns, Ross Anderson, Rebecca Root, Isla Johnston, and Amy Brenneman joined the cast of the second series as Kimmie, Derek Powell, Thomas Fulton, Winnie Calderwood, Christopher Herron, Phil Allenbeck, Ricky Daddario, June Lovesay, Agnes, and Helen respectively.

== Reception ==
The review aggregator website Rotten Tomatoes reported an 88% approval rating based on 60 critic reviews, with an average rating of 7.5/10. The website's critics consensus reads, "In a sea of generic crime dramas, Dept. Q stakes its claim amongst the thrilling, enthralling, and sublime thanks to a winning cast and veteran creative Scott Frank." Metacritic, which uses a weighted average, gave a score of 69 out of 100 based on 22 critics, indicating "generally favorable" reviews.

Kristen Baldwin of Entertainment Weekly gave the series an A− and said, "'Broken people healing themselves by providing closure for crime victims' can be an especially effective sub-genre if the writing, directing, and casting align – and in Dept. Q everything gels beautifully." Lucy Mangan reviewed the series for The Guardian, giving it a rating of 4/5 and describing the script as "sharp and lean, and especially good at channelling Morck's spitting sarcasm". Alan Sepinwall of Rolling Stone wrote, "Goode is an exposed nerve, ready to lash out at anyone around him for the slightest offence, which makes him a good match for Manvelov's understated cool as Akram, who is clearly much more dangerous than his reserved and polite demeanor would suggest." Daniel Fienberg of The Hollywood Reporter commented, "Solid mystery, great ensemble, ample ongoing potential."

== Viewership ==
According to data from Showlabs, Dept. Q ranked seventh on Netflix in the United States during the week of 2–8 June 2025.
