= A Second Chance (2014 film) =

2014 film

- Theatrical poster
- En chance til
- Directed by: Susanne Bier
- Written by: Anders Thomas Jensen
- Produced by: Sisse Graum Jørgensen
- Starring: Nikolaj Coster-Waldau; Ulrich Thomsen; Maria Bonnevie; Nikolaj Lie Kaas; Lykke May Andersen
- Cinematography: Michael Keith Snyman
- Edited by: Pernille Bech Christensen
- Music by: Johan Söderqvist
- Production companies: Zentropa; Danmarks Radio; Det Danske Filminstitut; Film Fyn; Film i Väst
- Distributed by: Nordisk Film
- Release dates: 9 September 2014 (TIFF); 15 January 2015 (Denmark)
- Running time: 105 minutes
- Country: Denmark
- Languages: Danish; Swedish

A Second Chance (Danish: En chance til) is a 2014 Danish thriller film directed by Susanne Bier. The film stars Nikolaj Coster-Waldau, Ulrich Thomsen, Maria Bonnevie, Nikolaj Lie Kaas and Lykke May Andersen. It was screened in the Special Presentations section of the 2014 Toronto International Film Festival.

== Plot ==
Police detective Andreas and his partner Simon are called to investigate an argument in a junkie couple's badly rundown flat, where they discover a child in a wardrobe lying in its own excrement. The seven-week-old child Sofus is dirty and hungry but after he has been examined by Social Services they realize he is in good health. Because of that, he cannot be taken from his parents Tristan and Sanne, even though they are well-known drug addicts.

Andreas himself has a seven-week-old child called Alexander with his wife Anne. They love him dearly and he is well looked after, but he is not an easy child. Soon Anne is unable to cope with Alexander because of her own mental instability. One early morning Andreas wakes up with Anne crying and a dead Alexander. A distraught Anne threatens to kill herself should Andreas call an ambulance who would take Alexander from her. After he has calmed down his wife and convinced her to take sleeping pills, Andreas takes the dead baby to the hospital. Waiting in the hospital's parking lot, he then decides to swap the babies and breaks into Tristan and Sanne's flat, where the parents are sleeping off a high. Anne is distraught. She refuses to accept the baby Andreas brings as her own.

The next morning Tristan notices that Sofus is dead. Sanne tells her husband that the dead baby is not her son. Tristan fears that he and Sanne will go to prison and takes their stroller to a busy street, where he pretends that someone has abducted his child from it. Andreas and Simon, who are ordered to investigate, repeatedly interrogate Tristan and Sanne concerning the whereabouts of the dead baby (Alexander).

Anne seems to have come to terms with the new situation. On one of her nightly walks, she parks the stroller in the middle of the road on a bridge. This forces a trucker to stop. After she convinces him to take the baby and keep it warm in his cabin, she jumps into the freezing river. In the wake of Anne's death, Andreas and his mother care for the baby (Sofus).

In ensuing interrogations, Andreas and his partner try to get Tristan to talk. Andreas slips up when he calls the baby "Alexander" instead of "Sofus". After Tristan is told that Sanne has testified and that they would have to find the baby to prove cot death, he comes clean. Andreas reacts with an outburst of rage, hitting and kicking Tristan, whereupon his superior sends him home and orders a meeting with the police psychologist. Tristan leads the police to a remote area in a forest, where he buried the baby.

Sanne has been admitted to a psychiatric hospital. She insists that the dead baby was not Sofus.

At Alexander's autopsy, it is revealed that he died due to a cerebral hemorrhage caused by shaken baby syndrome and that he had several older bleeds and rib fractures. Andreas realizes that Anne is responsible for the maltreatment. In a knee-jerk reaction, he heads for his mother's holiday home with Sofus. Meanwhile, his police partner Simon has figured out that Andreas must have swapped the babies. He looks for him at the holiday home and gets it across to Andreas that to turn himself in is the only right choice. He'd be dismissed from his job in law enforcement but be let off on a suspended sentence because of significant mitigating circumstances.

Andreas takes Sofus to the psychiatric clinic and returns him to Sanne, who is overjoyed. Some years later Sanne goes shopping at a hardware store, where Andreas works after leaving the police. When she leaves the child alone for a moment, Andreas talks to him and learns his identity.

== Cast ==
- Nikolaj Coster-Waldau as Andreas
- Ulrich Thomsen as Simon
- Maria Bonnevie as Anne
- Nikolaj Lie Kaas as Tristan
- Lykke May Andersen as Sanne
- Bodil Jørgensen as Retsmediciner
- Thomas Bo Larsen as Klaus

== Themes ==
The film raises the question of ethical boundaries if a child is in distress or being abused. If social services appear to be unable or unwilling to help, where is the boundary?
