= The Keeper of Lost Causes =

2013 Danish film directed by Mikkel Nørgaard

- Theatrical release poster
- Danish: Kvinden i buret
- Directed by: Mikkel Nørgaard
- Screenplay by: Nikolaj Arcel
- Based on: Kvinden i buret by Jussi Adler-Olsen
- Produced by: Peter Aalbæk Jensen; Louise Vesth
- Starring: Nikolaj Lie Kaas; Fares Fares; Sonja Richter; Søren Pilmark
- Cinematography: Eric Kress
- Edited by: Morten Egholm; Martin Schade
- Music by: Patrik Andren; Uno Helmersson; Johan Soderqvist
- Distributed by: Nordisk Film
- Release dates: 31 January 2013 (GIFF); 3 October 2013 (Denmark)
- Country: Denmark
- Language: Danish

The Keeper of Lost Causes (Danish: Kvinden i buret), also known as Department Q: The Keeper of Lost Causes, is a 2013 Danish film directed by Mikkel Nørgaard. The movie is based on the novel Mercy by Jussi Adler-Olsen. It is the first film in the Department Q film series, followed by The Absent One (2014) and A Conspiracy of Faith (2016).

== Synopsis ==
Carl Mørck is demoted to Department Q, the cold case unit, after a raid he instigated goes wrong. One case, a suspected suicide, piques his interest. His investigations suggest that the victim, a rising politician named Merete Lynggaard, was actually kidnapped. Mørck ruffles feathers and is told to halt the investigation, but he and his assistant Assad persist.

As the duo investigate the case further, they get into trouble with Swedish police and are suspended, but they continue their investigation. Lynggaard is revealed to be imprisoned in a pressure chamber by a vengeful chef named Lasse. When Lynggaard and Lasse were children, Lynggaard playfully blindfolded her father as he was driving, causing a deadly car crash that killed both of her parents as well as Lasse's father and younger sister. The confinement and torture of Lynggaard is Lasse's revenge.

Carl and Assad locate the pressure chamber and rescue Lynggaard as she is about to die, and they arrest Lasse. Because of their action and the prominence of the case, the police chief reinstates the duo as detectives.

== Cast and characters ==
- Nikolaj Lie Kaas as Carl Mørck
- Fares Fares as Assad
- Sonja Richter as Merete Lynggaard
- Mikkel Boe Følsgaard as Uffe Lynggaard
- Søren Pilmark as Marcus Jacobsen
- Troels Lyby as Hardy Henningsen
- Patricia Schumann as Søs Norup
- Eric Ericson as Johan Lundquist

== Release ==
The film was first shown at the Gothenburg Film Festival in January 2013, followed by several more film festivals before its cinema release in Denmark on 3 October 2013. The film topped the local box office in 2013 with 725,000 Danish moviegoers buying tickets.

== Reception ==
=== Critical response ===
On the review aggregator website Rotten Tomatoes, 70% of 27 critics' reviews are positive, with an average rating of 5.9/10.
