= Fares Fares =

Swedish actor (born 1973)

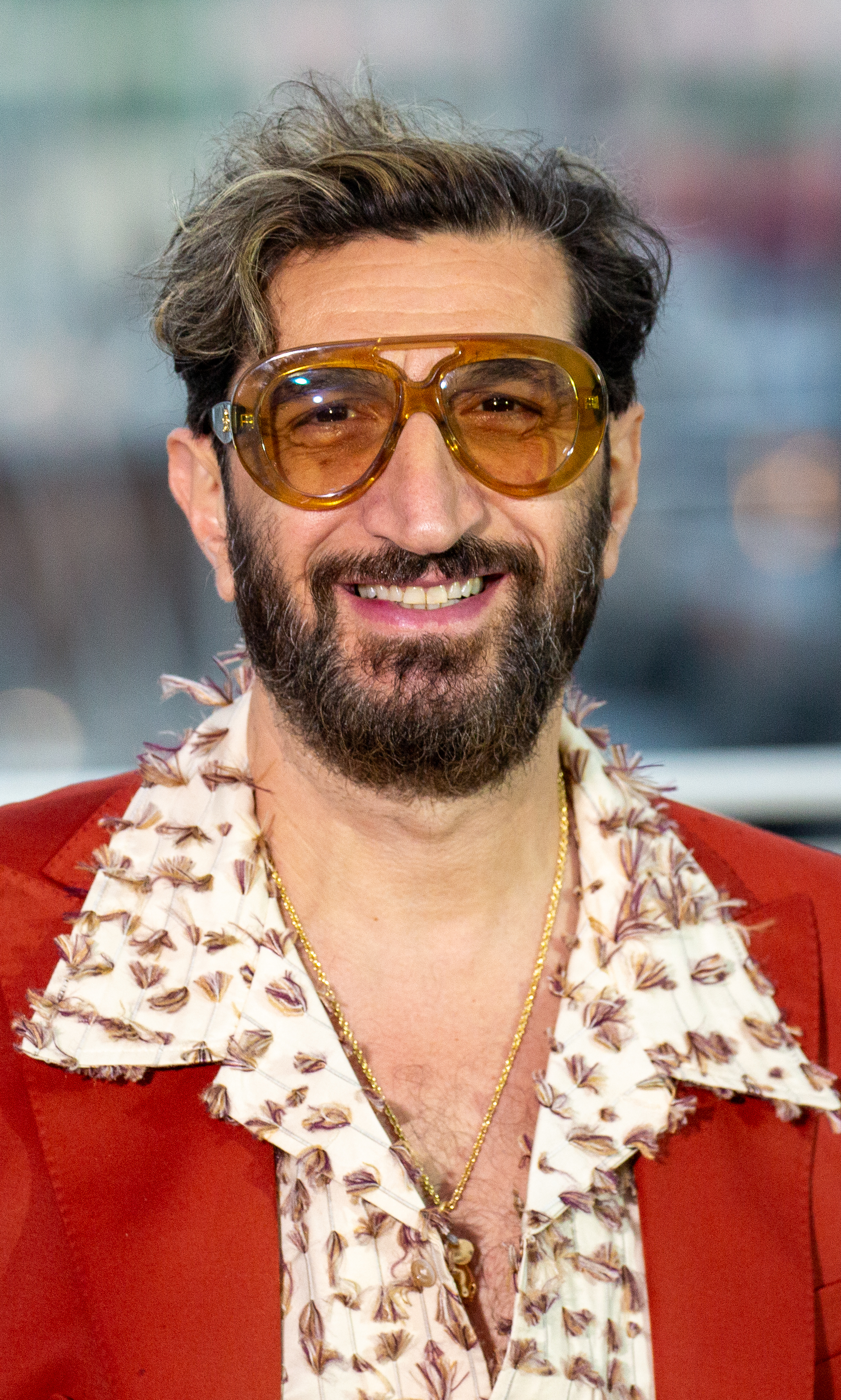
- Fares at the 2025 Cannes Film Festival
- Born: 29 April 1973 (age 53); Beirut, Lebanon
- Occupations: Actor; director; producer
- Years active: 2000–present
- Spouse: Clara Hallencreutz (m.)
- Relatives: Josef Fares (brother); Roy Fares (cousin)

Fares Fares (Swedish pronunciation: [ˈfǎːrɛs ˈfǎːrɛs]; born 29 April 1973) is a Swedish actor, producer, and director. He is known for his collaborations with director Tarik Saleh, as well as his roles in notable shows such as Chernobyl and The Wheel of Time. Fares has received various accolades, including a Guldbagge Award for Best Actor in a Leading Role and two Robert Awards for Best Actor in a Supporting Role.

== Early life ==
Fares was born on 29 April 1973 in Beirut, Lebanon to a family of Assyrian origin. His younger brother is director Josef Fares, and he has four sisters. In 1987, when Fares was 14 years old, his family moved to Sweden, residing in Örebro. They moved to escape the Lebanese Civil War and chose Sweden because they had relatives who had already lived there. Fares says he learned Swedish within three months of living in Sweden.

From the age of 15, Fares acted in a local theater group in Örebro. When he was 19, he attended drama school in Mölnlycke near Gothenburg, Sweden. He spent six years working in the Theatre Tamauer.

== Career ==
Clara Hallencreutz Fares and Fares Fares in 2026

=== Film ===
Fares has played major parts in films directed by his brother, Josef Fares. He debuted in Jalla! Jalla! (2000) and Kopps (2003). He starred in Bang Bang Orangutang (2005) and Kill Your Darlings (2006).

In 2010, Fares starred in the Swedish crime thriller Easy Money with Joel Kinnaman. The film was critically acclaimed and was picked up for American distribution by Harvey Weinstein.

In 2012, Fares made his Hollywood debut in the Denzel Washington movie Safe House. He played American CIA officer Hakim in Zero Dark Thirty (2012). Fares had a role in Child 44 (2014) with Tom Hardy and Gary Oldman. Fares played Senator Vaspar in the Star Wars franchise movie Rogue One: A Star Wars Story (2016).

For The Keeper of Lost Causes (2013), which was set in Denmark, Fares learned to speak Danish in two months. This film was the first of ten features based on Jussi Adler-Olsen's Department Q novels. Fares and Nikolaj Lie Kaas appeared in the first four of these films, produced by Zentropa. Their roles were later recast when the film rights were sold to Nordisk Film.

Fares is partially known for his long-standing collaborative relationship with director Tarik Saleh, most famously starring in his Cairo trilogy, consisting of The Nile Hilton Incident (2017), Boy from Heaven (2022), and Eagles of the Republic (2025). Each film examines and criticizes the political corruption within Egypt at different levels during different periods, with Fares' characters at the center of pivotal events or circumstances. He has also had minor roles in the director's other films The Contractor (2022) and Metropia (2009), as well as various music videos he's directed for Lykke Li.

In 2020, Fares made his producing debut with the miniseries Partisan. A few years later, in 2023, he made his directorial debut with A Day and a Half, a Netflix original film which was loosely inspired by a real story.

=== Television ===
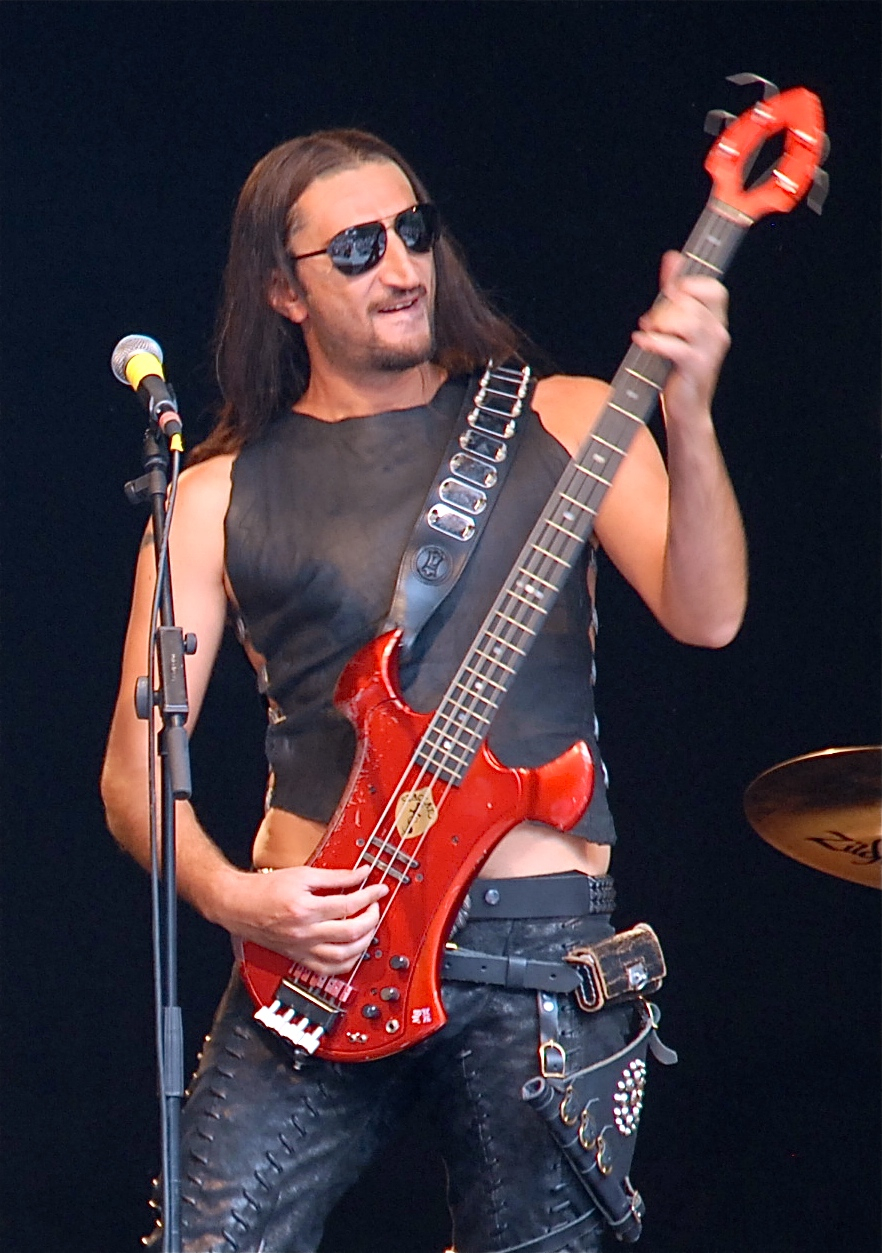
Fares at the Stockholm City Theatre, 2009

In 2014, Fares portrayed Fauzi Nadal in the TV show Tyrant on the FX Network. Tyrant was renewed for a second season, which began airing in the summer of 2015, and a third season in summer 2016. From 2018 to 2019, Fares appeared in the two HBO series Westworld and Chernobyl. He portrayed the Forsaken Ishamael in The Wheel of Time in 2021, 2023 and 2025. In 2024, he appeared in the recurring role of Ruggiero in Netflix's The Decameron.

=== Theater ===
- 1996: Samuel Beckett's I väntan på Godot (Waiting for Godot) at Teater Tamauer, Sweden
- 2000: Dom, directed by Jasenko Selimovic, with Torkel Petersson, at the Gothenburg City Theatre (Göteborgs Stadsteater), Gothenburg, Sweden
- 2000: Natten före skogarna at Teater Tamauer, Sweden
- 2001: Tillbaka till öknen at the Royal Dramatic Theatre, Stockholm, Sweden
- 2002: Köket at the Gothenburg City Theatre, Gothenburg, Sweden
- 2003: Brott, hemtjänst, straffpengar, pensionärsmord at Backstage, Sweden
- 2003: Den arabiska natten at Backstage, Sweden

=== Other work ===
- 2004: Fares and his brother Josef voice acted in the Swedish dub of Shark Tale
- Fares appears in two music videos for Lykke Li; 2011 single, "I Follow Rivers", directed by Tarik Saleh and 2014 album teaser, "I Never Learn"
- Appeared in Daniel Lemma's music video "If I Used To Love You" with Torkel Petersson
- 2011: TV commercial for Tanqueray "Tonight We Tanqueray" — the bartender
- 2012: Short film, sponsored by Maiyet called Sleepwalking In the Rift, directed by Cary Fukunaga
- 2018: Voice acted in the video game A Way Out — Leo Caruso
- 2021: Additional voices for It Takes Two
- 2022: TV commercial for Volvo "The Parents" — the father
- 2025: Additional voices for Split Fiction

== Personal life ==
Fares has stated that he spends time in Stockholm and Los Angeles.

== Filmography ==
=== Film ===
Year	Title	Role	Director	Notes
2000	Before the Storm	Hostage taker	Reza Parsa	
2000	Jalla! Jalla!	Roro	Josef Fares	
2001	Days Like This	Michel	Mikael Håfström	
2002	Mofars Big Bang	Doctor	Gunnar A. Hellström	
2003	Kopps	Jacob	Josef Fares	
2004	I'm Your Man	Omar	Sarah Gyllenstierna	Short film
2004	Day and Night	Kristian	Simon Staho	
2004	Chlorox, Ammonium and Coffee	Jesus	Mona J. Hoel	
2004	Fakiren fra Bilbao	Frank Flambert	Peter Flinth	
2005	Zozo	The Chicken (voice)	Josef Fares	
2005	Bang Bang Orangutang	Patrik	Simon Staho	
2006	Kill Your Darlings	Omar	Björne Larson	
2006	7 miljonärer	Kristoffer El-Zeid	Michael Hjorth	
2008	For a Moment, Freedom	Manu	Arash T. Riahi	
2008	The Fur	Richardt	Björne Larson	Short film
2009	Metropia	Firaz Sanoman (voice)	Tarik Saleh	
2010	Easy Money	Mahmoud	Daniel Espinosa	
2012	Sleepwalking in the Rift		Cary Joji Fukunaga	Short film
2012	Safe House	Vargas	Daniel Espinosa	
2012	Easy Money II: Hard to Kill	Mahmoud	Babak Najafi	
2012	Zero Dark Thirty	Hakim	Kathryn Bigelow	
2013	The Keeper of Lost Causes	Assad	Mikkel Nørgaard	
2014	The Absent One	Assad	Mikkel Nørgaard	
2015	Child 44	Alexei Andreyev	Daniel Espinosa	
2016	The Commune	Allon	Thomas Vinterberg	
2016	A Conspiracy of Faith	Assad	Hans Petter Moland	
2016	Rogue One: A Star Wars Story	Vasp Vaspar	Gareth Edwards	
2017	The Nile Hilton Incident	Noredin Mustafa	Tarik Saleh	
2018	The Purity of Vengeance	Assad	Christoffer Boe	
2022	The Contractor	Salim	Tarik Saleh	
2022	Boy from Heaven	Ibrahim	Tarik Saleh	
2023	A Day and a Half	Lukas Malki	Fares Fares	
2025	Eagles of the Republic	George Fahmy	Tarik Saleh	
2026	Adult Supervision	Bobo	Alex Schulman	

=== Television ===
Year	Title	Role	Director	Network	Notes
2007	Leende guldbruna ögon	Roshan	Emiliano Goessens, Anna Hylander	SVT1	
2008	Maria Wern – Främmande fågel	Jonathan Sauma	Erik Leijonborg	TV4	
2014–2016	Tyrant	Fauzi Nadal	Gideon Raff	FX	Main role; 19 episodes
2018	Westworld	Antoine Costa	Various directors	HBO	Recurring role; season 2
2018	Deep State	Gabriel	Robert Connolly	FOX	Guest appearance; Episode "Old Habits"
2019	Chernobyl	Bacho	Johan Renck	HBO	Miniseries; Episode "The Happiness of All Mankind"
2020	Partisan	Johnny	Amir Chamdin	Viaplay	Main role; season 1, 5 episodes
2021–2025	The Wheel of Time	Ishamael / Ba'alzamon	Various directors	Amazon Prime Video	Main role; 10 episodes
2024	The Decameron	Ruggiero	Andrew DeYoung, Anya Adams	Netflix	Miniseries; recurring role, 2 episodes
2025	We Come In Peace	Elias Charbel	Jens Jonsson, Mani Maserrat	TV4	Miniseries; main role
2026	Bytet (A Couple of Lies)	Carl Wester	Kasper Barfoed	Netflix	Miniseries; main role

=== Video games ===
Year	Title	Role	Director	Notes
2018	A Way Out	Leo Caruso (voice)	Josef Fares	Main role, also motion capture
2021	It Takes Two	Leo Caruso (voice)	Josef Fares	Cameo appearance
2025	Split Fiction	Leo Caruso (voice)	Josef Fares	Cameo appearance
