= Chlorox, Ammonium and Coffee =

Chlorox, Ammonia and Coffee
- Directed by: Mona J. Hoel
- Written by: Mona J. Hoel
- Produced by: Malte Forssell/Mona J. Hoel
- Starring: Kjersti Holmen; Fares Fares; Svein Scharffenberg; Dennis Storhøi; Benedikte Lindbeck, Eva Bergh, Jannike Bonnevie,
- Cinematography: Hoyte van Hoytema
- Edited by: Hélène Berlin
- Distributed by: SF Norway/Freedom from fear A/S
- Release date: 6 August 2004
- Running time: 106 minutes
- Country: Norway
- Language: Norwegian

Chlorox, Ammonia and Coffee (Norwegian: Salto, salmiakk og kaffe) is a 2004 Norwegian comedy film written and directed by Mona J. Hoel, starring Benedikte Lindbeck, Kjersti Holmen and Fares Fares. The film follows multiple storylines, and is about having the courage to take chances in life.
