= Jussi Adler-Olsen =

Danish crime fiction writer

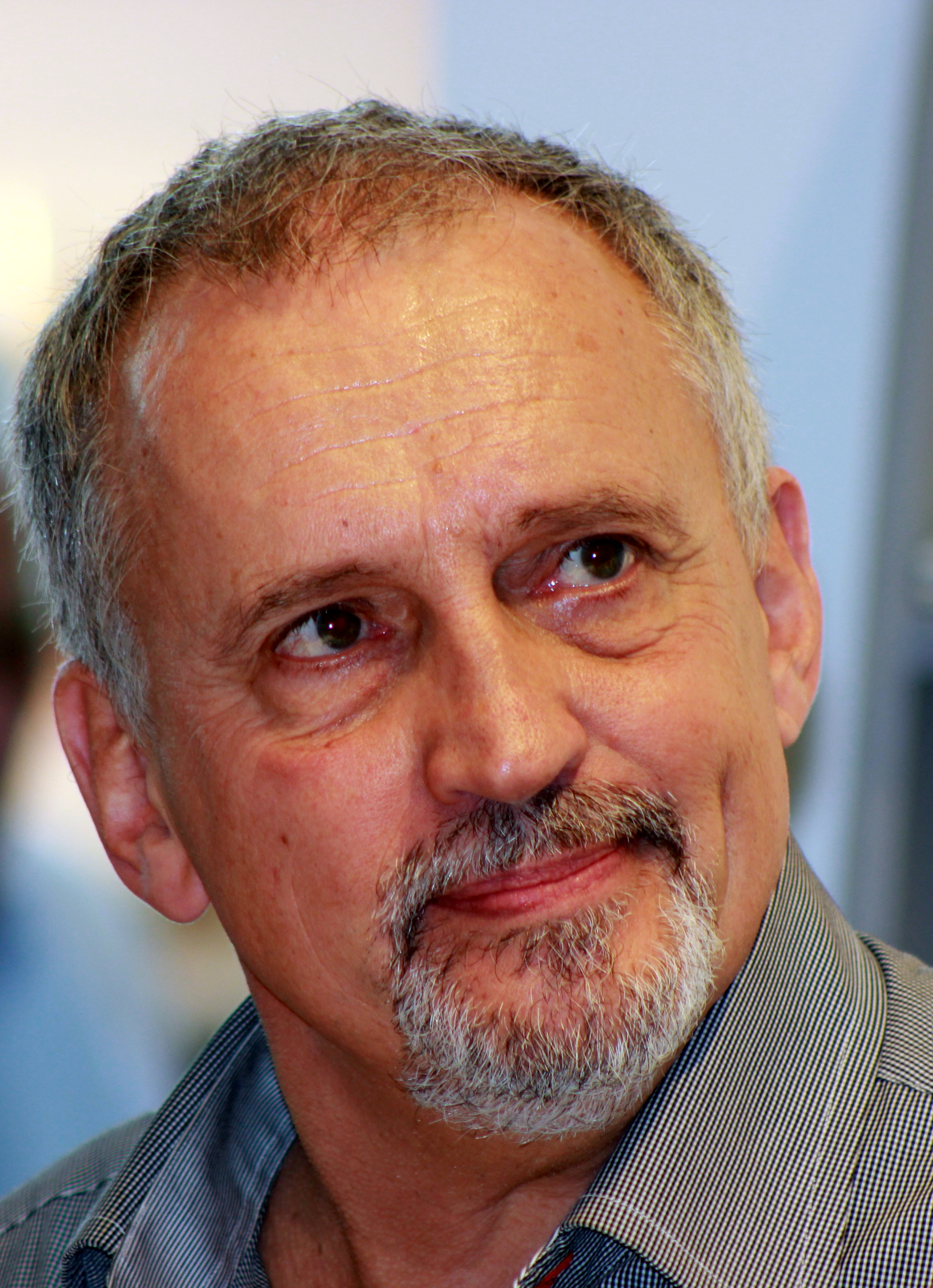
- Adler-Olsen in 2012
- Born: 2 August 1950 (age 76); Copenhagen, Denmark
- Writing career
- Years active: 1984–present

Carl Valdemar Jussi Henry Adler-Olsen (born 2 August 1950) is a Danish crime fiction writer, a publisher, editor, and entrepreneur, best known for his Department Q series. He made his debut as a nonfiction writer in 1984, and as a fiction writer in 1997.

== Biography ==
Born in Copenhagen, he was the youngest of four children and the only boy. Son of the successful sexologist and psychiatrist Henry Olsen, he spent his childhood with his family in doctors' official residences at several mental hospitals across Denmark. In his late teens, he played in a couple of pop groups as lead guitarist. He graduated from high school in Rødovre (1970), and studied medicine, sociology (passed History of Modern Politics), and film making (exam.art.) until 1978.

After a managerial career, he began to write full-time in 1995.

Adler-Olsen's novels have been sold in more than 40 languages. Outside Denmark he has enjoyed particular success in Norway, Germany, and the Netherlands, being a frequent visitor on the top of the bestseller lists, e.g., on The New York Times Paperback bestseller list. Adler-Olsen's books have been on the bestseller lists in numerous other countries including Austria, Iceland, France, Spain, Sweden, and Switzerland.

In February 2025, Adler-Olsen disclosed to the Danish newspaper Politiken that he is suffering from incurable multiple myeloma.

== Awards and nominations ==
- 2010 – Harald Mogensen Prize for Flaskepost fra P. Awarded by the Danish Academy of Crime for Best Danish Crime Fiction.
- 2010 – Glass Key award 2010 for Flaskepost fra P. Awarded by the Scandinavian Crime Society (Skandinaviska Kriminalsällskapet).
- 2010 – De beste thriller van het jaar 2010 for Kvinden i buret (Dutch: Vrouw in de Kooi) in the Netherlands.
- 2010 – Læsernes Bogpris, Berlingske Tidende for Flaskepost fra P. Very prestigious Danish national newspaper. The award is given for all books, not for a subcategory.
- 2011 – De Gyldne Laurbær 2011 for Journal 64. Awarded by the Society of Booksellers in Denmark.
- 2011 – Won 3rd place Der Leserpreis – die besten Buecher 2011 for Erlösung in Germany. It is the biggest audience book award in the German-speaking area. Readers nominate their favorite books for the annual Leserpreis.
- 2011 – Nominated Buchliebling 2011 for Schändung in Austria. (became no. 4)
- 2012 – Krimi Blitz Award 2011 for Flaskepost fra P. in Germany. Awarded by Krimi-couch.de on the basis of reader's votes.
- 2012 – Prix du Livre Robinsonnais, catégorie Policiers in France.
- 2012 – Danskernes Yndlingsforfatter (Bog & Ide) in Denmark. The favorite author of the year in Denmark 2011 as a result of a vote among readers carried out by the bookseller chain Bog & Ide.
- 2012 – The Sealed Room Award 2012 for Kvinden i Buret (The Keeper of Lost Causes) in Japan. Given by the Sealed Room Club.
- 2012 – Grand prix des lectrices de Elle in the category Policier 2012 awarded in France Kvinden i Buret – in French Misericorde.
- 2012 – The Barry Award Best Novel of 2012 for Kvinden i Buret – in the US The Keeper of Lost Causes.
- 2012 – Shortlisted to Der Leserpreis – die besten Buecher 2012 for Verachtung in Germany (The Purity of Vengeance) became no. 7. It is the biggest audience book award in the German-speaking area. Readers nominate their favorite books for the annual Leserpreis.
- 2013 – Danskernes Yndlingsforfatter (Bog & Ide) 2012 in Denmark. The favorite author of the year in Denmark 2013 as a result of a vote among readers carried out by the bookseller chain Bog & Ide.
- 2013 – Årets Lydbog for Flaskepost for P in Sweden. Swedish award for best audio book of the year for Q3.
- 2013 – Prix Plume du Thriller international for Miséricorde (The Keeper of Lost Causes) – first place, which is called Plume d'or in France
- 2013 – Shortlisted to Der Leserpreis – die besten Buecher 2013 for Erwartung. (became no. 7). It is the biggest audience book award in the German-speaking area. Readers nominate their favorite books for the annual Leserpreis.
- 2013 – Nominated to the 2013 International Dublin Literary Award.
- 2013 – Prix des Lecteurs catégorie Polar' (France) – awarded by Le Livre de Poche.
- 2013 – Martha Prisen 2013 (Bog & Ide – Denmark) – the favorite author of the year in Denmark 2013 as a result of a vote among readers carried out by the bookseller chain Bog & Ide.
- 2014 – Coup de cœur de La Griffe Noire (France) awarded during the pocketbook festival Saint-Maur en Poche 21 June 2014.
- 2014 – Nominated to The Barry Award Best Novel of 2014 for Flaskepost fra P – in US A Conspiracy of Faith.
- 2014 – Le Prix d'honneur Boréales/Région Basse-Normandie du polar nordique for Journal 64 in France. Awarded on 29 November 2014 in Caen, France.
- 2014/2015 – European Crime Fiction Star Award (Ripper Award) 2014/2015. Awarded on 17 March 2015 in Unna, Germany.
- 2015 – MIMI, dem Krimi-Publikumspreis des deutschen Buchhandels 2015 (Germany) for Erwartung – Marco Effekten.
- 2015 – Nominated to The Barry Award Best Novel of 2015 for Marco Effekten – in US the Marco Effect.
- 2015 – Nominated to Der Leserpreis Die Besten Bücher 2015 for "Verheissung" in the category "Krimi und Thriller." It is the biggest audience book award in the German-speaking area. Readers nominate their favorite books for the annual Leserpreis.
- 2016 – Mystery Lover's Book of the Year – CRIME Award 2015 for The Keeper of Lost Causes (US) – awarded by the Carondelet Branch Library (part of the St. Louis Public Library) St. Louis, Missouri, US.
- 2017 – Nominated to the prestigious Publikumspris 2017 by Krimimessen i Horsens – the biggest crime fiction festival in Northern Europe.
- 2017 – Honorary Craftsman 2017 awarded by the Association of Craftsmen in Copenhagen.
- 2017 – BookStar Award 2017 Festival of European Literature, Macedonia.
- 2017 – Nominated to Der Leserpreis Die Besten Bücher 2017 for "Selfies" in the category "Krimi und Thriller." It is the biggest audience book award in the German-speaking area. Readers nominate their favorite books for the annual Leserpreis.
- 2018 – Nominated to the prestigious Publikumspris 2018 by Krimimessen i Horsens – the biggest crime fiction festival in Northern Europe.
- 2019 – Publikumspris 2019 by Krimimessen i Horsens – the biggest crime fiction festival in Northern Europe.
- 2019 – Nominated to Der Leserpreis Die Besten Bücher 2017 for "Offer 2117" in the category "Krimi und Thriller." It is the biggest audience book award in the German-speaking area. Readers nominate their favorite books for the annual Leserpreis.
- 2019 – Book of the year 2019 – Saxo for "Offer 2117".
- 2019 – Shortlisted to Mofibo Awards for "Offer 2117" in the category "Krimi og Spænding."
- 2020 – Babelio Award in the category: "Polat et thriller" in France "Victime 2117"
- 2022 – Rheinbacher Glasdolch
- 2023 – Shortlisted to Mofibo Awards for "Offer 2117" in the category "Krimi og Spænding."
- 2023 – Shortlisted to The Petrona Award for "The Shadow Murders"
- 2024 – Nominated to "Publikumspris 2024" by Krimimessen in Horsens – the biggest crime fiction festival in Northern Europe. "Publikumspris 2024". Krimimessen.
- 2025 – Nominated to "Vi Elsker Serier 2025" – In the category "Bedste kriminalroman" for "Døde sjæle synger ikke"
- 2025 – Martha Prisen 2025 (Bog & Ide – Denmark) – together with Line Holm and Stine Bolther – the favorite author of the year in Denmark 2025 as a result of a vote among readers carried out by the bookseller chain Bog & Ide.

== Adaptations ==
Kvinden i buret was adapted into a Danish film by Zentropa in 2013, titled The Keeper of Lost Causes in English. It was the top box-office film in Denmark in 2013. A sequel, a film adaptation of Fasandræberne (distributed as The Absent One in English), was released in 2014. Flaskepost fra P (A Conspiracy of Faith in English) came out in 2016, also by Zentropa. In 2018 Journal 64 was released, titled The Purity of Vengeance in English. All four films star Nikolaj Lie Kaas as Carl Mørck and Fares Fares as Assad. From book no. 5 – Nordisk Film took over the dramatization and Marco Effekten was released in 2021, Den grænseløse (Boundless in English) came out in 2024.

In 2024, a television series adaptation for Netflix began filming entitled Dept. Q. The series was released on 29 May 2025, and was renewed for a second season in August 2025.

== Bibliography ==
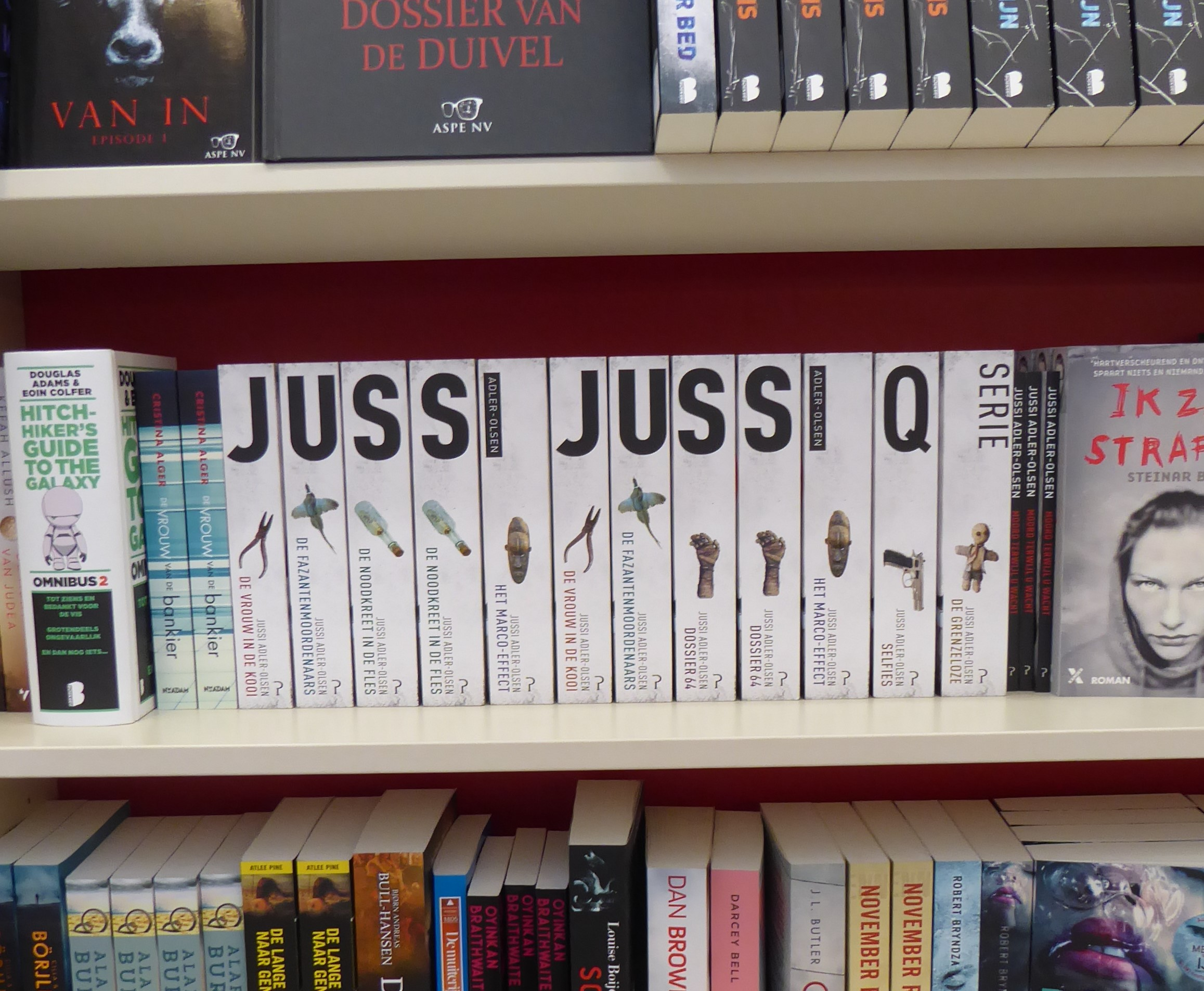
Spines of successive Jussi Adler-Olsen novels in Standaard Boekhandel, Blankenberge, Belgium

- Groucho & Co's groveste (in Danish). Valby, Denmark: Donna. 1984. ISBN 978-87-88287-00-4.
- Dansk tegneserieleksikon - den store Komiklex (in Danish). Valby, Denmark: Donna. 1985. ISBN 87-88287-12-2.
- Groucho: …en Marx Brother bag facaden (in Danish). Valby, Denmark: Donna. 1985. ISBN 978-87-88287-06-6.
- Videocounter (in Danish). Valby, Denmark: Donna. 1985. ISBN 978-87-88287-02-8.
- Alfabethuset (in Danish). Copenhagen, Denmark: Cicero. 1997. ISBN 978-87-7714-260-4. English translation: The Alphabet House, 2014 ISBN 978-1-84391-545-4
- Firmaknuseren (in Danish). Copenhagen, Denmark: Lademanns Forlag. 2002. ISBN 978-87-567-8958-5.
- Firmaknuseren - later editions published by Politiken Og Hun Takkede Guderne (in Danish). Copenhagen, Denmark: Egmont Bogklubberne. 2003. ISBN 978-87-632-0237-4.
- Washington dekretet (in Danish). Copenhagen, Denmark: Aschehoug. 2006. ISBN 978-87-11-29222-8.; English translation: The Washington Decree (US), 2018
- Kvinden i buret (in Danish). Copenhagen, Denmark: Politiken. 2007. ISBN 978-87-567-8396-5.; English translation: The Keeper of Lost Causes (US), Mercy (UK), 2011 [= Department Q Vol. 1]
- Fasandræberne (in Danish). Copenhagen, Denmark: Politiken. 2008. ISBN 978-87-567-8727-7.; English translation: The Absent One (US), Disgrace (UK), 2012 [= Department Q Vol. 2]
- Flaskepost fra P. (in Danish). Copenhagen, Denmark: Politiken. 2009. ISBN 978-87-7065-539-2.; English translation: A Conspiracy of Faith (US), Redemption (UK), 2013 [= Department Q Vol. 3]
- Journal 64 (in Danish). Copenhagen, Denmark: Politiken. 2010. ISBN 978-87-567-9545-6.; English translation: The Purity of Vengeance (US) 2013, Guilt (UK) 2013 [= Department Q Vol. 4]
- Små Pikante Drab published in the book Liv for Liv (in Danish). Copenhagen, Denmark: Politiken. 2011. ISBN 978-87-567-9791-7.
- Marco Effekten (in Danish). Copenhagen, Denmark: Politiken. 2012. ISBN 978-87-567-9906-5.; English translation: The Marco Effect (US) 2014, Buried (UK) 2015 [= Department Q Vol. 5]
- Den Grænseløse (in Danish). Copenhagen, Denmark: Politiken. 2014. ISBN 978-87-400-0859-3.; English translation: The Hanging Girl (2015) [= Department Q Vol. 6]
- Selfies (in Danish). Copenhagen, Denmark: Politiken. 2017. ISBN 978-05-259-5495-8.; English translation: The Scarred Woman [= Department Q Vol. 7]
- Offer 2117 (in Danish). Copenhagen, Denmark: Politiken. 2019. ISBN 978-87-400-4163-7.; English translation: Victim 2117 (US) 2020 ISBN 978-1-5247-4255-3 [= Department Q Vol. 8]
- Natrium Chlorid (in Danish). Copenhagen, Denmark: Politiken. 2021. ISBN 978-874-004-513-0.; English translation: The Shadow Murders (US), 2022 ISBN 978-1524742584 [= Department Q Vol. 9]
- Sprækken (in Danish). Denmark: Forlaget AfArt. 2022. ISBN 978-87-926-2458-1.;
- 7 m2 med lås (in Danish). Copenhagen, Denmark: Politiken. 2023. ISBN 978-87-400-4514-7.; English translation: Locked In (US), 2024 ISBN 978-1529434545 [= Department Q Vol. 10]

== Theater ==
- Spidsrod a theater play in acts – finalist in a major drama competition DramaRama in April 2005. Århus Teater, the Katapult stage.
- Erbarmen ("Mercy"), produced in cooperation with Sabrina Ullrich, was a play based on Kvinden i Buret. It premiered in Castrop-Rauxel on 19 October 2013.

== See also ==
- Danish literature
