= King's Game =

2004 Danish political thriller film

- Directed by: Nikolaj Arcel
- Screenplay by: Nikolaj Arcel; Rasmus Heisterberg
- Based on: King's Game by Niels Krause Kjær
- Produced by: Meta Louise Foldager
- Starring: Anders W. Berthelsen; Nicolas Bro; Søren Pilmark
- Cinematography: Rasmus Videbæk
- Edited by: Mikkel E. G. Nielsen
- Music by: Henrik Munck; Flemming Nordkrog
- Distributed by: Dogwoof Pictures (United Kingdom); Medusa Distribuzione (Italy)
- Release dates: 10 August 2004 (Locarno Film Festival); 23 September 2005 (Denmark)
- Running time: 107 minutes
- Language: Danish

King's Game (Kongekabalen) is a 2004 Danish political thriller film directed by Nikolaj Arcel. It stars Anders W. Berthelsen and Nicolas Bro as reporters uncovering a Government conspiracy. The film received critical praise and won many awards.

Produced by Nimbus Film, King's Game was originally a book written by former parliamentary press officer Niels Krause Kjær.

== Plot ==
Eleven days before the parliamentary election, the Centre Party's main candidate, who is about to become the next Danish Prime Minister, and his wife are injured in a car accident. His situation is critical and nobody knows if he will survive. Even his wife, who is also hospitalised, is not informed. The next day, Torp is assigned to cover the election. Quickly, he is drawn into the internal power struggle in the Centre Party where two very different politicians, Erik Dreyer and Lone Kjeldsen, show interest in gaining power and potentially becoming the next prime minister. Torp, the son of a previous justice minister, writes his first front-page story after a tip-off from the Centre Party press coordinator, Peter Schou. The story turns out to be "planted spin" in order to damage Lone Kjeldsen (Nastja Arcel) to allow the advantage to Dreyer who benefits from her lost credibility.

Ulrik is determined to get to the truth behind the lies that drive Kjeldsen's vulnerable husband to suicide. Tracing the misinformation to its source, he reveals what he knows to his editor and the paper's owner who turns out to be an old college friend of Dreyer. Both close ranks and Torp is fired. Torp tries to confront Dreyer over what he knows to be a cover-up of the death of the leader Aksel Brunn who is reported as being still on life support though sources tell him the man was "brain dead from day one". Even Brunn's 22-year-old son is paid off to back Dreyer's stalling but Dreyer dismisses Torp as an unemployed malcontent. Finally, by joining forces with a left-wing stringer, Henrik Moll (Nicolas Bro), Torp succeeds in exposing the plot and Dreyer on national television. However, the effects last only a short time before Dreyer's contacts and influence push him on a wave to the top.

== Cast ==
- Anders W. Berthelsen – Ulrik Torp
- Søren Pilmark – Erik Dreyer
- Nastja Arcel – Lone Kjeldsen
- Nicolas Bro – Henrik Moll
- Lars Mikkelsen Peter Schou
- Ulf Pilgaard – Gunnar Torp
- Lars Brygmann – Mads
- Charlotte Munck – Mette Torp

== Awards ==
The film won eight Robert Awards including Best Film.

== Distribution ==
King's Game was released in the UK in 2005 by Dogwoof Pictures. It was the first film released on the Digital Screen Network DSN, supported by the UK Film Council run by Arts Alliance Digital Cinema and was digitally projected on screens across the country. The intention of the DSN is that this will make it easier to show independent films in the UK as the distribution will be through electronic means rather than the transfer of physical film reels.
