= Brothers (2004 film) =

- Theatrical release poster
- Directed by: Susanne Bier
- Written by: Susanne Bier; Anders Thomas Jensen
- Produced by: Sisse Graum Jørgensen
- Starring: Nikolaj Lie Kaas; Connie Nielsen; Ulrich Thomsen
- Cinematography: Morten Søborg
- Edited by: Pernille Bech Christensen; Adam Nielsen
- Music by: Johan Söderqvist
- Production company: Zentropa
- Distributed by: Nordisk Film
- Release date: 27 August 2004
- Running time: 117 minutes
- Country: Denmark
- Languages: Danish; English; Arabic

Brothers (Danish: Brødre) is a 2004 Danish psychological thriller war film directed by Susanne Bier and written by Bier and Anders Thomas Jensen. It stars Nikolaj Lie Kaas, Connie Nielsen and Ulrich Thomsen.

The film was remade as an American production with the same title (2009), directed by Jim Sheridan.

== Plot ==
A Danish army officer, Michael, is sent to the International Security Assistance Force operation in Afghanistan for three months. His first mission there is to find a young radar technician who had been separated from his squad some days earlier. While on the search, his helicopter is shot down and he is taken as a prisoner of war, but is assumed to have been killed in action and is reported dead to his family. His wife Sarah and younger brother Jannik both deeply mourn him, and that brings them closer together. They kiss once, but pass it off as grief and do not pursue the relationship.

Meanwhile, both the officer and a young technician are locked up in a warehouse, kept without food or water. After Michael shows them how to arm and disarm an anti-aircraft missile, his captors decide the technician is no longer useful and have Michael bludgeon him to death with a lead pipe in order to save his own life. Eventually, he is rescued and brought back to Denmark. The guilt of what he did forces him to lie and provide false hope that the technician may still be alive.

Michael becomes unstable, spiraling down into a pit of guilt and rage, and begins to threaten and abuse his wife and tear the house apart. It finally becomes necessary for the police to intervene. Michael overreacts, pointing a policeman's pistol at the officers. After Michael is taken into custody, Jannik helps Sarah begin the repairs on the house. Later, Sarah visits Michael in prison, where he breaks down and finally admits the truth about what he did in Afghanistan.

== Cast ==
- Connie Nielsen as Sarah
- Ulrich Thomsen as Michael
- Nikolaj Lie Kaas as Jannik
- Sarah Juel Werner as Natalia (daughter)
- Rebecca Løgstrup as Camilla (daughter)
- Bent Mejding as Henning
- Solbjørg Højfeldt as Else
- Niels Olsen as Allentoft
- Paw Henriksen as Niels Peter
- Lars Hjortshøj as Preben 2
- Lars Ranthe as Preben 1
- André Babikian as Slobodan
- Lene Maria Christensen as J. Solvej
- Laura Bro as Ditte
- Henrik Koefoed as Bartender
- Tom Mannion as Captain David Ward

== Production ==
The film was produced by Zentropa in co-production with companies in the United Kingdom, Sweden and Norway. It received support from the Danish Film Institute, Swedish Film Institute and Nordisk Film- & TV-Fond (Nordic Film and TV Foundation). It was primarily shot on location in Copenhagen, Denmark; Almería, Spain, was used for the Afghanistan locales.

== Reception ==
On the review aggregator website Rotten Tomatoes, 89% of 73 critics' reviews are positive, with an average rating of 7.5/10. The website's consensus reads: "This tense, understated drama explores the complications of individual and social ethics stemming from the repercussions of war on one man and his family." Metacritic, which uses a weighted average, assigned the film a score of 76 out of 100, based on 30 critics, indicating "generally favorable" reviews.

== Opera adaptation ==
An opera entitled Brothers, based on the story of the film, was composed by Icelandic composer Daníel Bjarnason. It was premiered at the Musikhuset Aarhus in Denmark on 16 August 2017. It was commissioned by Den Jyske Opera. The libretto was written in English by Kerstin Perski; the director was Kasper Holten. To celebrate Aarhus as the European Capital of Culture 2017, three stage works – a musical, a ballet, and an opera all based on films by Susanne Bier – were commissioned and performed in Musikhuset.
