= Johan Söderqvist =

Swedish film score composer (born 1966)

- Born: 11 February 1966 (age 60); Täby, Sweden
- Occupation: Composer
- Years active: 1991–present

Johan Söderqvist (born 11 February 1966) is a Swedish film score composer. He has twice been nominated for the European Film Award for Best Composer for his film scores.

== Personal life ==
Johan Söderqvist was born in Täby, outside Stockholm in Sweden, he attended the Royal College of Music in Stockholm, studying composition and arranging.

== Career ==
Söderqvist was a keyboard player in many different jazz bands and folk music groups and has toured extensively around the world before concentrating his activities on composition for film, television, radio and theatre.

He wrote his first film score for Agnes Cecilia in 1991 and since then he has written numerous scores for film and television, including nine scores for films directed by the acclaimed Danish director Susanne Bier. Among those titles are the award-winning score for Brothers (2004), After the Wedding (2006) and Things We Lost in the Fire (2007), where he collaborated with Academy Award-winning composer Gustavo Santaolalla, and most recently the Best Foreign Language Oscar-winning In a Better World (2010). He composed an award-winning score for Tomas Alfredson's film Let the Right One In (2008) and the music to the Oscar-nominated Norwegian film Kon-Tiki (2012).

In 2005 and 2009, Söderqvist was nominated as Best Composer by the European Film Academy for his Brothers (2004) and Let the Right One In (2008) scores. The Brothers score was also awarded Best Film Music at Cannes as well as the 'Rencontres cinématographiques de Cannes' Award for Best Music in Film. Söderqvist was one of the main composers of 2016 video game Battlefield 1 and its 2018 sequel Battlefield V. He provided the score for the Norwegian film Amundsen, which was released in February 2019, and the US television miniseries Anatomy of a Scandal (2022).

== Discography ==
=== Film ===
Year	Title	Director	Studio(s)	Notes
1991	Agnes Cecilia – en sällsam historia	Anders Grönros	SVT Drama	—N/a
1991	Freud Leaving Home	Susanne Bier	Les Acacias Cinéaudience	—N/a
1992	Brev til Jonas	Susanne Bier	—N/a	Short film
1992	Stortjuvens pojke	Henry Meyer	Folkets Bio	—N/a
1993	Family Matters	Susanne Bier	Svensk Filmindustri	—N/a
1995	Like It Never Was Before	Susanne Bier	Svensk Filmindustri	—N/a
1997	Beneath the Surface	Daniel Fridell	—N/a	—N/a
1998	The Glassblower's Children	Anders Grönros	—N/a	—N/a
2000	Swedish Beauty	Daniel Fridell	—N/a	—N/a
2001	Family Secrets	Kjell-Åke Andersson	—N/a	—N/a
2002	We Can Be Heroes!	Ulf Malmros	—N/a	—N/a
2003	Misa mi	Linus Torell	—N/a	—N/a
2003	At Point Blank	Peter Lindmark	—N/a	—N/a
2004	Brothers	Susanne Bier	Nordisk Film	—N/a
2005	Four Weeks in June	Henry Meyer	—N/a	—N/a
2005	Bloodbrothers	Daniel Fridell	Public Art Entertainment AB	—N/a
2006	After the Wedding	Susanne Bier	Nordisk Film	—N/a
2006	Say That You Love Me	Daniel Fridell	Noble Entertainment	—N/a
2006	Exit	Peter Lindmark	—N/a	—N/a
2006	The Monastery: Mr. Vig and the Nun	Pernille Rose Grønkjær	—N/a	—N/a
2007	Walk the Talk	Matthew Allen	—N/a	—N/a
2007	A Man Comes Home	Thomas Vinterberg	—N/a	—N/a
2007	Things We Lost in the Fire	Susanne Bier	—N/a	—N/a
2008	Let the Right One In	Tomas Alfredson	—N/a	—N/a
2009	Love and Rage	Morten Giese	—N/a	—N/a
2009	The Murder Farm	Bettina Oberli	—N/a	—N/a
2010	Earth Made of Glass	Deborah Scranton	—N/a	—N/a
2010	In a Better World	Susanne Bier	Nordisk Film	—N/a
2010	Limbo	Maria Sødahl	—N/a	—N/a
2010	King of Devil's Island	Marius Holst	—N/a	—N/a
2011	El Medico: The Cubaton Story	Daniel Fridell	—N/a	—N/a
2011	Love Addict	Pernille Rose Grønkjær	—N/a	—N/a
2011	False Trail	Kjell Sundvall	Sonet Film AB	—N/a
2011	The Road	Yam Laranas	GMA Films	—N/a
2012	Seile sin egen sjø	Synnøve Macody Lund; Carl Christian Raabe	—N/a	—N/a
2012	Kon-Tiki	Joachim Rønning; Espen Sandberg	Nordisk Film	—N/a
2012	Love Is All You Need	Susanne Bier	Nordisk Film	—N/a
2012	Painless	Juan Carlos Medina	DistriB Films	—N/a
2013	The Keeper of Lost Causes	Mikkel Nørgaard	Nordisk Film	Composed with Patrik Andrén and Uno Helmersson
2013	Behind Bron/Broen	Pelle Hybbinette	—N/a	—N/a
2014	A Second Chance	Susanne Bier	Nordisk Film	—N/a
2014	The Absent One	Mikkel Nørgaard	Nordisk Film	Composed with Patrik Andrén and Uno Helmersson
2014	Captain Sabertooth and the Treasure of Lama Rama	John Andreas Andersen; Lisa Marie Gamlem	—N/a	—N/a
2014	Serena	Susanne Bier	Magnolia Pictures	—N/a
2016	The Limehouse Golem	Juan Carlos Medina	Lionsgate	—N/a
2016	The King's Choice	Erik Poppe	Nordisk Film	—N/a
2018	Per Fugelli: Siste resept	Erik Poppe	Nordisk Film	—N/a
2018	The Quake	John Andreas Andersen	Nordisk Film	Composed with Johannes Ringen
2018	Phoenix	Camilla Strøm Henriksen	—N/a	—N/a
2018	The Congo Murders	Marius Holst	Nordisk Film	—N/a
2019	Amundsen	Espen Sandberg	—N/a	—N/a
2019	Held for Ransom	Niels Arden Oplev; Anders W. Berthelsen	Nordisk Film	—N/a
2019	The Last Vermeer	Dan Friedkin	TriStar Pictures	—N/a
2020	Betrayed	Eirik Svensson	Samuel Goldwyn Films	—N/a
2021	The Burning Sea	John Andreas Andersen	Just Entertainment	—N/a
2021	The Emigrants	Erik Poppe	Film i Västerbotten	—N/a
2023	The Liberation	Anders Walter	Nordisk Film	—N/a
2024	Madame Web	S. J. Clarkson	Columbia Pictures	—N/a
2025	The Lightkeeper	Vic Sarin	Sepia Films	—N/a

=== Television ===
Year	Title	Notes
1993	Morsarvet	—N/a
1999	Kajsas ko	—N/a
2000	En klass för sig	—N/a
2003–2004	Hem till Midgård	—N/a
2005	Lite som du	—N/a
2011–2018	The Bridge	—N/a
2016–2018	Spring Tide	—N/a
2022	Anatomy of a Scandal	—N/a
2024	Ronja, the Robber's Daughter	—N/a

=== Video games ===
Year	Title	Notes
2016	Battlefield 1	Composed with Patrik Andrén
2018	Battlefield V	Composed with Patrik Andrén
2024	Delta Force: Hawk Ops	Composed with Lithium Done, Jason Hayes, Edwin Mendler, Jason Huang, LUMi, Audiomachine, LAZERH
2025	ARC Raiders	Composed with Patrik Andrén
