= Leah Byrne =

Scottish actress

- Born: Glasgow, Scotland
- Occupation: Actress
- Years active: 2014-present
- Television: Dept. Q

Leah Byrne is a Scottish stage and television actress.

== Career ==
=== Stage ===
After drama school, Leah joined the Dundee Rep Ensemble Graduate Actor Scheme, a well-regarded programme known for nurturing rising talent – previous alumni include Ncuti Gatwa. During her time with the Rep, she appeared in productions such as Tay Bridge and Oor Wullie. She also appeared as one of the Sharkey twins in Wolfie (some sort of fairytale) at The Tron Theatre, Glasgow in 2023.

=== Television ===
She has had television roles in Deadwater Fell, Call the Midwife, and Nightsleeper. In 2025, she appeared as Detective Constable Rose Dickson in the Netflix series Dept. Q, a police procedural following a troubled but determined unit led by DCI Carl Morck (played by Matthew Goode). In September 2026, Byrne was nominated at the for the BAFTA Scotland Audience Award.

== Personal life ==
Leah Byrne grew up in Yoker, Glasgow, and began attending the Scottish Youth Theatre at the age of 11. Naturally shy as a child, she credits her time at SYT with giving her the confidence and skills to pursue a career in acting.

She went on to study at the Royal Conservatoire of Scotland, graduating with a BA in Acting in 2019.

Leah’s older brother Nathan is also an actor, but they are not from a showbusiness background. Their father Petee worked as a postman, and their mother Elizabeth is a retired call centre worker.

== Filmography ==
Year	Title	Role	Notes
2019	Call the Midwife	Maggie	1 episode
2020	Deadwater Fell	IVF Nurse	2 episodes
2021	The Last Bus	Helen	1 episode
2022	Dog Squad	Sarah	1 episode
2024	Nightsleeper	Woman at the piano	1 episode
2025	Dept. Q	Rose	Lead cast
