= Nikolaj Arcel =

Danish filmmaker and screenwriter

Nicolaj Arcel
- Born: 25 August 1972 (age 53); Copenhagen, Denmark
- Occupations: film director, screenwriter, producer
- Years active: 1999–present

Nikolaj Arcel (born 25 August 1972) is a Danish filmmaker. He is best known for his 2012 film A Royal Affair, which won two prizes at the Berlin International Film Festival and which was nominated for Best Foreign Language Film at the Academy Awards, as well as the 2017 American film The Dark Tower.

== Early life ==
Arcel was born and raised in Copenhagen. His mother Libby Tata Arcel is a psychologist from the town of Mytilene on the Greek island of Lesbos, while his father, Arne Arcel, is an architect from Denmark. His parents divorced when he was seven. His elder sister is actress Nastja Arcel. He attended Bernadotte School in Hellerup and secondary school at Øster Borgerdyd Gymnasium. He then enrolled at the National Film School of Denmark from where he graduated as film director in 2001. His graduation project, the short film Woyzeck's Last Symphony, won the Grand Prix at Clermont-Ferrand International Short Film Festival.

== Career ==
Arcel made his debut in 2004 with the political thriller King's Game, which won him the award for Best Director at the Danish Film Academy Awards. It was followed by the adventure film Island of Lost Souls in 2007 and the generational comedy Truth About Men in 2010.

After experiencing an international breakthrough with A Royal Affair, he moved to Hollywood to pursue a career in filmmaking there. He directed the film adaptation of Stephen King's The Dark Tower. The film began principal photography in early 2016, and it was released on 4 August 2017.

Arcel will be directing the movie Fables for Warner Bros.

In 2022, he reunited with Mikkelsen for The Promised Land.

== Filmography ==
Short film

- Woyzeks sidste symfoni (2001)

Feature film

| Year | Title | Director | Writer | Notes |
|---|---|---|---|---|
| 2002 | Klatretøsen | No | Yes | |
| 2004 | King's Game | Yes | Yes | |
| 2007 | Island of Lost Souls | Yes | Yes | |
| 2007 | Cecilie | No | Yes | |
| 2007 | Fightgirl Ayse | No | Yes | |
| 2008 | Journey to Saturn | No | Yes | |
| 2009 | The Girl with the Dragon Tattoo | No | Yes | Nominated- BAFTA Award for Best Adapted Screenplay |
| 2010 | Truth About Men | Yes | Yes | |
| 2012 | A Royal Affair | Yes | Yes | Silver Bear for Best Screenplay; Nominated- Academy Award for Best International Feature Film; Nominated- Golden Globe Award for Best Foreign Language Film; Nominated- César Award for Best Foreign Film |
| 2013 | The Keeper of Lost Causes | No | Yes | |
| 2014 | The Absent One | No | Yes | |
| 2016 | A Conspiracy of Faith | No | Yes | |
| 2017 | The Dark Tower | Yes | Yes | |
| 2018 | The Purity of Vengeance | No | Yes | |
| 2023 | The Promised Land | Yes | Yes | |
| 2026 | What Lies Between Us | No | Yes | |

Television

- Millennium (2010) (2 episodes)

== Awards ==
- 2004 Best Director, Danish Film Academy Awards (won)
- 2012 Dreyer Award
