= Søren Pilmark =

Danish actor (born 1955)

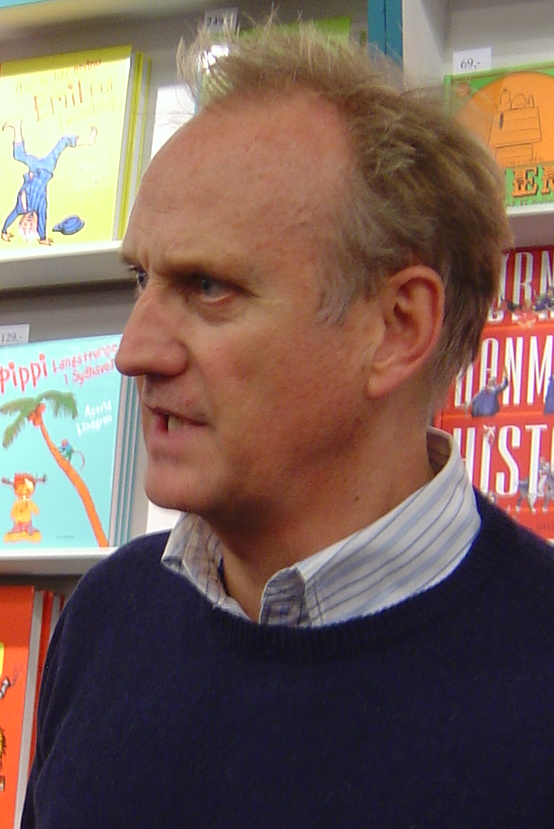
- Søren Pilmark being interviewed during the book fair BogForum at Forum Copenhagen in 2008.
- Born: Søren Louis Pilmark Nielsen; 16 October 1955 (age 70); Copenhagen, Denmark
- Occupation: Actor
- Years active: 1976–present
- Spouse: Susanne Pilmark (m. 1983)
- Parent(s): Louis Nielsen (father); Birte Pilmark (mother)

Søren Louis Pilmark (born Nielsen; 16 October 1955) is a Danish actor. Pilmark has worked as a film and theatrical actor, a director, and as an author. He is perhaps best known for his role in the 2005 thriller film King's Game, and has also appeared in many Danish TV series. He is also known for his role in the former musical/comedy group Ørkenens Sønner ("Sons of the Desert"),

== Early life and education ==
Søren Louis Nielsen was born in Copenhagen, Denmark, on 16 October 1955, the son of school principal Louis Nielsen and secretary Birte Nielsen (born Pilmark). He grew up in Hvidovre, and took on his mother's maiden name at some point.

Pilmark graduated from the four-year course at the Aarhus Theatre Acting School in 1977.

== Acting career ==
=== Theatre ===
Pilmark remained a member of the Aarhus Theatre company until 1980. He performed mostly in comedies and musicals, after his first stage performance being in Chicago in 1976. During his student years, along with Anders Bircow, Asger Reher, and Preben Kristensen, he was part of the cabaret group Barbershop Harmony, but he left the group after a year.

From 1981 to 1994 he was a member of the company of the Royal Danish Theatre. Over the course of his theatrical career, Pilmark has played a variety of roles in plays including Marx and Coca Cola (1981), Natten før skoven (1985), Der var engang (1987), Sparekassen (1986), Bunburry (1987), Mågen (1987), "Esther" (1989) and the title role in Richard III (1994). Pilmark also performed at Folketeatret; the Aveny Theatre; the Betty Nansen Theatre (Johannes in Ordet, 1991; Hamlet, 1992; Copenhagen, 2000); Østre Gasværk Teater (Miss Saigon in 1996); Gladsaxe Theatre (Trold kan tæmmes, 1999); and the Bellevue Theatre.

With Per Pallesen he created The Pallesen Pilmark Show, which toured in both in Asia and in the United States from 1984 to 1998. A TV version of the show, which was broadcast on DR, won the Silver Rose at the Rose d'Or Festival in 1985.

In 1991 Pilmark joined the musical/comedy group Ørkenens Sønner ("Sons of the Desert") together with Henrik Koefoed, Niels Olsen, and Asger Reher, who performed at the Bellevue Theatre for a number of years.

As a stage director, Pilmark worked on Dyrene i Hakkebakkeskoven (1996) and Simpatico (1997).

=== Film and television ===
Pilmark's first film role was as an extra, a boy in the street, in the comedy Den kære familie in 1962. Later film roles include Flickering Lights (2000) and Erik Dreyer in King's Game (Kongekabalen, 2004), Roser og persille (1993), Menneskedyret (1995), Lad de små børn (2004), Lotto (2006), Kærestesorger (2009), Kon-Tiki (2012), and Downsizing (2017). He had a recurring role in the Jussi Adler-Olsen thrillers Kvinden i buret (The Keeper of Lost Causes, 2013), Fasandræberne (The Absent One, 2014), Flaskepost fra P (Bottle Post from P, 2016), and Journal 64 (2018).

On Danish television, he played "3B" in Een stor familie, Arne Weel in Kald mig Liva, and a real estate agent called Mark in Taxa (1999). He has had roles in various other TV series, including the 1994 miniseries Riget (The Kingdom, s2, 1997); Gøngehøvdingen (1992), Lykke (Happiness, 2011–2012), 1864 (2014), Gidseltagningen (Beneath the Surface, 2019), and Riget Exodus (2022). He also had roles in Norwegian historical drama Atlantic Crossing (2020), and in the Netflix series Vikings: Valhalla (2022).

=== Other roles ===
Pilmark gained popularity through playing DSB TV commercials, dubbed "Harry and Bahnsen".

In 2001 Pilmark, along with Natasja Crone, hosted the Eurovision Melodi Grand Prix in the Park.

== Writing ==
Pilmark's published his first novel, Varieté, in 2021. The novel is a historical drama about a magician, set in a provincial vaudeville theatre in Denmark in the 1910s.

== Personal life ==
On 28 May 1983, Søren Pilmark married Susanne Rée.

As of February 2026 Pilmark and his wife and Susanne Pilmark are ambassadors for SOS Children's Villages in Denmark.

== Honours and awards ==
- 1989: Volmer Sørensens Mindelegat
- 1993: Arne Weels Legat
- 3 December 1994: Knight of the Order of Dannebrog
- 1995: Lauritzen Award
- 1995: Simon Spies Fondens Show-Pris
- 1996: Robert Award
- 2000: Robert Award for his role as Werner Heisenberg in Copenhagen
- 2000: Reumert Award for his role as Werner Heisenberg in Copenhagen
- 2000: Teaterpokalen (Theatre Cup)
- 2005: Robert Award for Best Actor in a Supporting Role for King's Game
- 2005: Bodil Award for Best Supporting Actor for King's Game
- Best actor for Flickering Lights, Method Fest
- 2008: Bronze portrait in a granite tile in Frederiksberg
- 2018: Street named after him, Pilmarken, in Østermarie on Bornholm

| Preceded by (Sweden) Kattis Ahlström & Anders Lundin | Eurovision Song Contest presenter (with Natasja Crone Back); 2001 | Succeeded by (Estonia) Annely Peebo & Marko Matvere |
