= Nikolaj Lie Kaas =

Danish actor (born 1973)

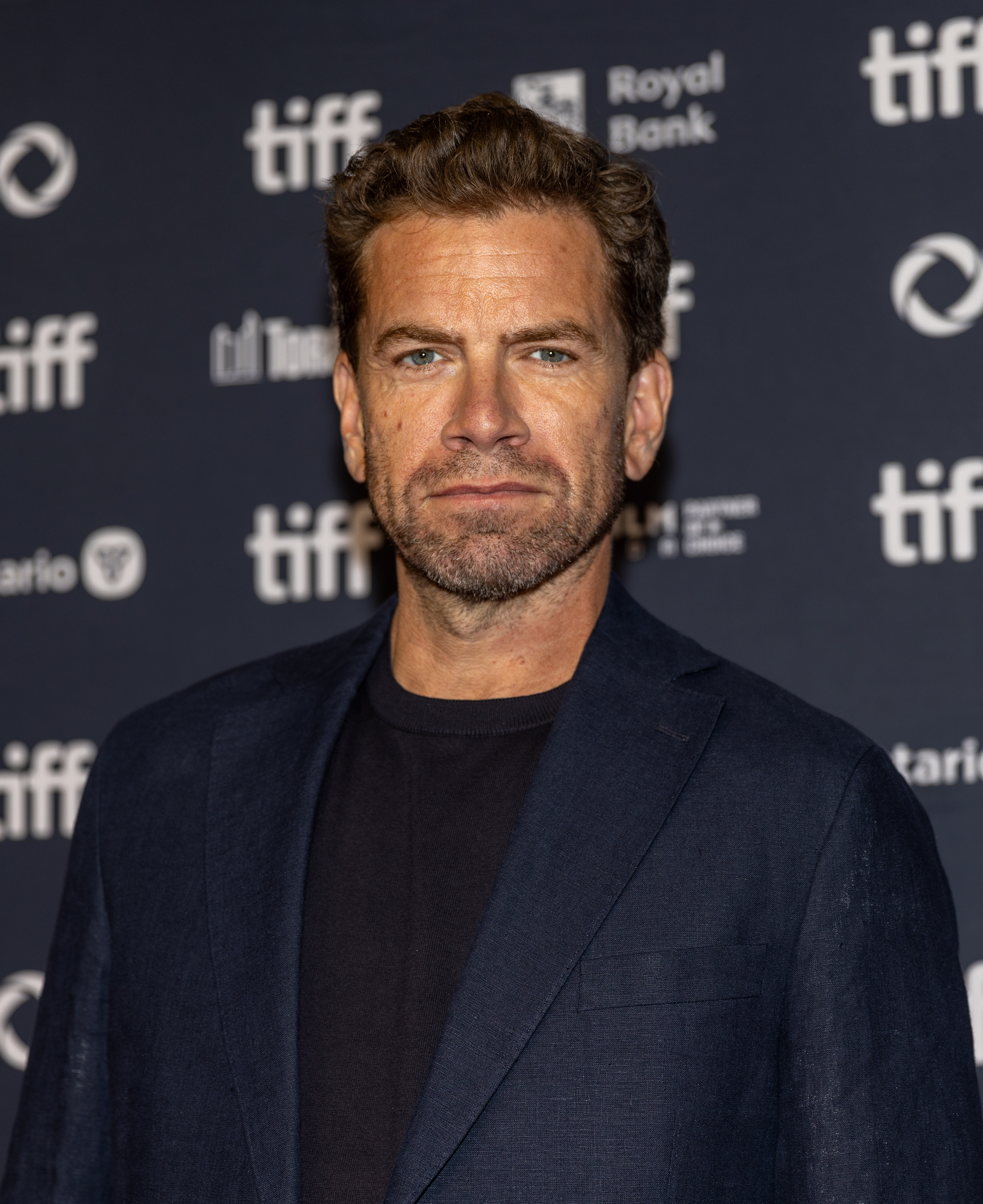
- Nikolaj Lie Kaas at the 2025 Toronto International Film Festival
- Born: 22 May 1973 (age 53); Rødovre, Denmark
- Occupation: Actor
- Years active: 1991–present
- Spouse: Anne Langkilde (m. 2003)

Nikolaj Lie Kaas (Danish: [ˈne̝koˌlɑjˀ ˈliˀ ˈkʰɔˀs]; born 22 May 1973) is a Danish actor whose career began in the 1990s. Kaas graduated from the National Theater School in Denmark in 1998. He first appeared on screen in Søren Kragh-Jacobsen's film The Boys from St. Petri in 1991 as Otto, the rebel son of a traitor.

Kaas has hosted the Zulu Comedy Galla on Danish TV three times (2009, 2011, 2012).

The son of actor Preben Kaas and actress/writer Anne Mari Lie, Kaas and his wife have two daughters. Their daughter Gerda Lie Kaas starred in the lead role of Clara for the Danish juvenile fantasy film, Wild Witch (2018).

In 2002 and 2012, Kaas won the Robert Award for Best Actor in a Leading Role.

In 2012, Kaas received the Lauritzen Award.

In 2003, Kaas was named as one of European film's "Shooting Stars" by the European Film Promotion.

== Filmography ==
Year	Title	Role	Notes
1991	The Boys from St. Petri	Otto Hvidmann	
1994	Carl, My Childhood Symphony	Carl 3	
1996	David's Book	Jacob	
1998	The Idiots	Jeppe	
1999	Possessed	Morten	
1999	In China They Eat Dogs	Martin	
1999	Disney's Tarzan	Tarzan	Voice only
2000	Max	Spacy	
2000	Flickering Lights	Stefan	
2001	Hr. Boe & Co.'s Anxiety	Leo	
2001	Truly Human	P.	Robert Award for Best Actor in a Leading Role
2001	Jolly Roger	Theobalt	
2002	Old Men in New Cars	Martin	
2002	Open Hearts	Joachim	
2003	The Green Butchers	Bjarne/Eigil	
2003	Stealing Rembrandt	Kiosk-Karsten	
2003	Reconstruction	Alex David	
2003	Dogville: The Pilot	Tom	
2004	Brothers	Jannik	
2004	Brother Bear	Kenai	Voice only
2005	The Sun King	Tommy	
2005	Adam's Apples	Holger	
2005	Murk	Jacob	
2005	Allegro	Alex in the zone	
2006	Clash of Egos	Claus Volter	
2006	The Ugly Duckling and Me	Ugly	Voice only
2006	Pu-239	Tusk	
2007	Just Another Love Story	Sebastian	
2008	The Candidate	Jonas Bechmann	
2009	Angels & Demons	Mr. Gray/assassin	
2009	At World's End	Adrian Gabrielsen	aka Ved verdens ende
2010	Parterapi	Anders	
2010	The Whistleblower	Jan Van Der Velde	
2011	Beast	Valdemar	
2011	A Funny Man	Dirch Passer	
2011	Freddy Frogface	Freddy Frogface	Voice only
2012	Forbrydelsen	Matthias Borch	
2012	Sover Dolly på ryggen	Gordon Dennis	
2013	The Keeper of Lost Causes	Carl Mørck	Svendprisen Award for Best Male Actor
2014	A Second Chance	Tristan	
2014	The Absent One	Carl Mørck	
2015	Child 44	Ivan Sukov	
2015	Men and Chicken	Gregor Thanatos	
2016	Follow the Money/Bedrag	Sander Søndergren	TV series
2016	A Conspiracy of Faith	Carl Mørck	
2017	You Disappear	Frederik Halling	
2018	The Purity of Vengeance	Carl Mørck	
2018	Britannia	Divis / The Outcast	TV series
2019	Collision	Leo Molgard	
2019	Face to Face	Sebastian / Bjarke	TV series
2020	Riders of Justice	Otto	
2022	The Kingdom	Filip Naver	5 episodes
2024	Families like Ours	Jacob	
2024	The Best Years	Mike	1 episode
2024	Way Home	Christian	
2025	The Last Viking	Anker	
2025	Frankenstein	Chief Officer Larsen	
