= Peter Aalbæk Jensen =

Danish film producer (born 1956)

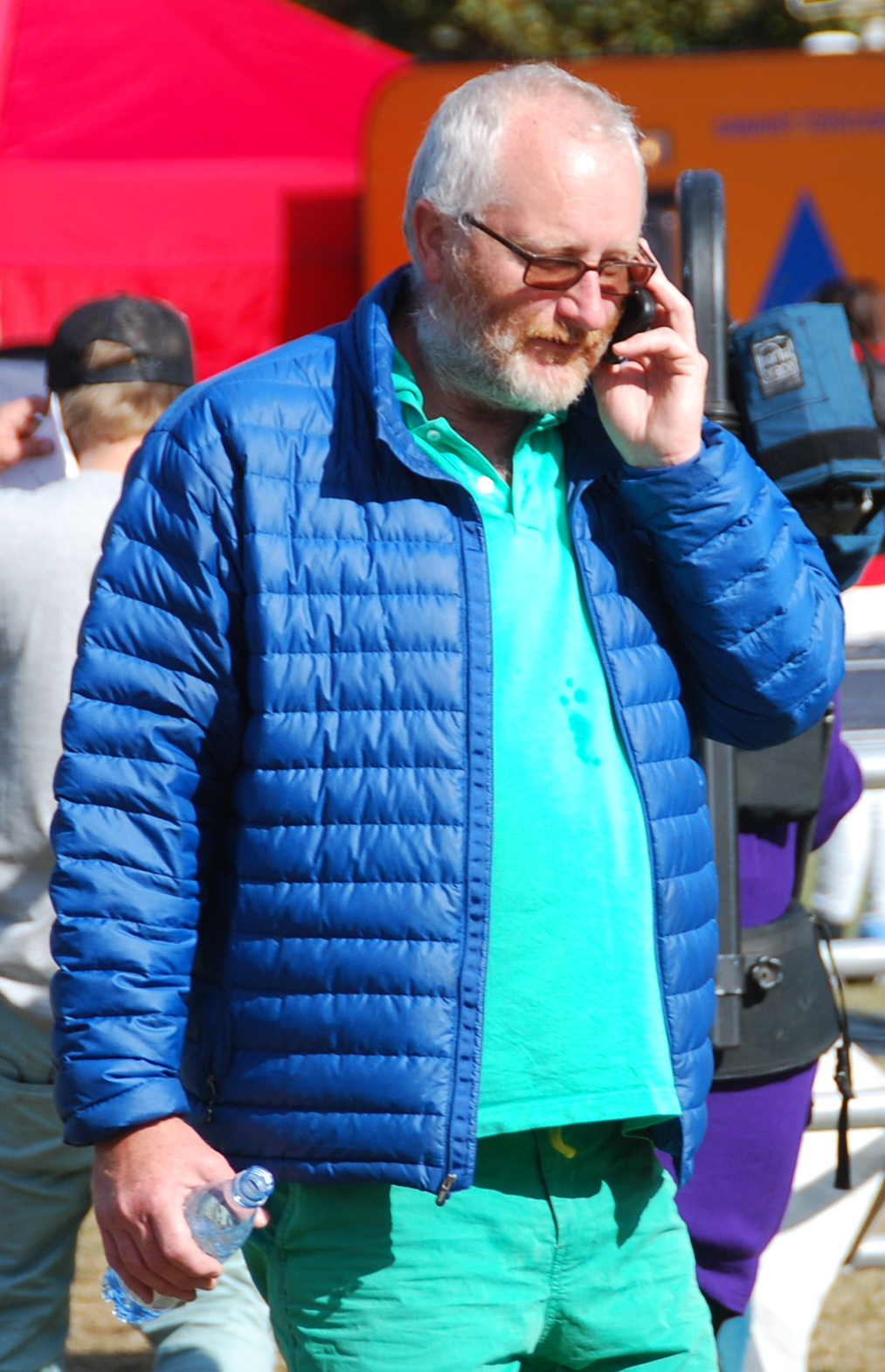
Aalbæk Jensen in 2010 (Photo: Lars Schmidt)

Peter Aalbæk Jensen (born 8 April 1956 in Osted) is a Danish film producer who in 1992 with director Lars von Trier founded the Danish film company Zentropa and later its huge studio complex Filmbyen. His father was the writer Erik Aalbæk Jensen.

Zentropa is known for the Dogme95-manifesto and such projects as Dogville (2003) starring Nicole Kidman, Dancer in the Dark (2000) starring Björk, The Five Obstructions, and the Oscar-nominated After the Wedding (2006).

Aalbæk Jensen has executive-produced more than 70 theatrical feature films and many television productions, has founded a long list of subsidiary companies and is widely regarded as the most important Danish film producer since the 1990s.

In autumn 2008, Aalbæk Jensen was a judge on the Danish version of Got Talent.

In 2017, nine women accused Aalbæk Jensen of sexual harassment and workplace bullying.
