= Johanne Louise Schmidt =

Danish actress (born 1983)

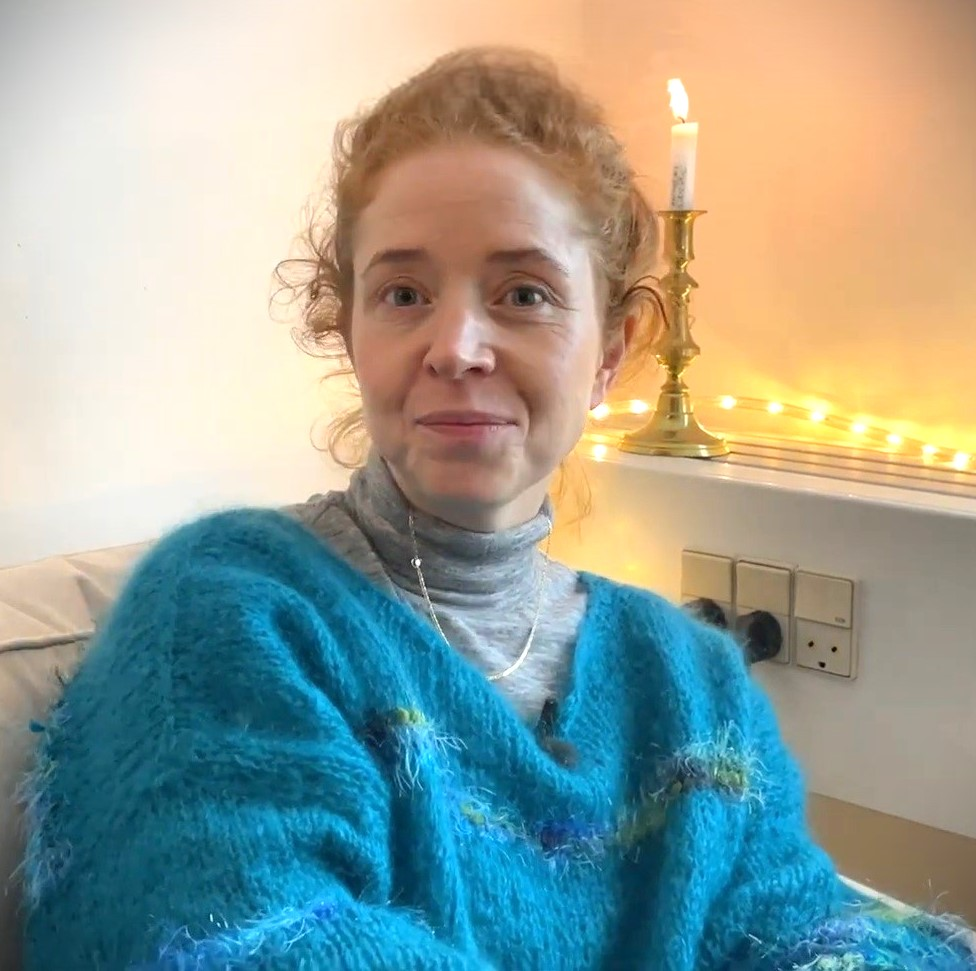
Schmidt in 2024

Johanne Louise Schmidt (born 16 October 1983) is a Danish actress who has performed on both stage and in film. In September 2014, she received the Stardust Award, one of the Crown Prince Couple's Awards presented by the Danish crown prince and his wife.

== Biography ==
Born in Skanderborg, Schmidt is the daughter of the bookseller Jørgen Schmidt and the nurse Kirsten Hust. After matriculating from Skanderborg Amts Gymnasium in 2003, she went on to study at the Royal Danish Theatre School, graduating in 2009. She debuted in Libertinen at Grønnegaards Theater where she also played in Den Vægelsindet. Since 2011, she has been permanently employed by the Royal Danish Theatre. In 2014, she starred on stage as Hedda Gabler and played Rose in the film Fasandræberne based on the novel by Jussi Adler-Olsen. She is also scheduled to play Rose in Adler-Olsen's third film in the same series.

In September 2014, she received the Rising Star Award (Stjernedryspris), one of the annual prizes presented as part of the Crown Prince Couple's Awards. She appeared in two seasons of DNA (2019, 2023).
