= Southern Book Prize =

American literary award

- Description: Honoring the best "Southern" literature as voted by indie booksellers and readers
- Country: United States
- Presented by: Southern Independent Booksellers Alliance (SIBA)
- Website: www.southernbooksellers.org

Southern Book Prize (formerly the SEBA Book Award and SIBA Book Award) is a literary award given by the Southern Independent Booksellers Alliance (SIBA). It was first awarded in 1999. Nominated books must be Southern in nature or by a Southern author, have been published the previous year, and have been nominated by a SIBA-member bookstore or one of their customers. Voting categories include fiction, Nonfiction, poetry, cooking and children's literature. In 2016, the award was renamed the Southern Book Prize and awarded in honor of southern writer Pat Conroy, who died in March 2016.

The first awards were given in 1999. From 1999 through 2007 winners were chosen by popular vote through an online voting mechanism. Starting in 2008, winners were chosen from the list of finalists by a jury of SIBA booksellers. Since 2019 candidates have been nominated by Southern indie booksellers before the ballot of finalists in three categories is voted on by bookstore customers. According to SIBA, 1800 ballots were cast to select the winners of the 2023 prize.

== Winners ==
=== Southern Book Prize ===
SIBA Book Award winners
Year	Category	Author	Title	Ref.
1999	Children	Debra Frasier	Out of the Ocean	
1999	Fiction	Tim Gautreaux	The Next Step in the Dance	
1999	Nonfiction	Tony Horwitz	Confederates in the Attic	
1999	Poetry	Andrew Glaze	Someone Will Go On Owing	
2000	Children	Ann Heiskell Rickey	Bugs & Critters I Have Known	
2000	Fiction	Fred Chappell	Look Back All the Green Valley	
2000	Nonfiction	Janisse Ray	Ecology of a Cracker Childhood	
2000	Poetry	Rodney Jones	Elegy for the Southern Drawl	
2001	Children	Kate DiCamillo	Because of Winn-Dixie	
2001	Fiction	Tony Earley	Jim the Boy	
2001	Nonfiction	Rick Bragg	Somebody Told Me	
2001	Poetry	Peter Meinke	Zinc Fingers	
2002	Children	J.J. Reneaux	How Animals Saved the People	
2002	Fiction	Doug Marlette	The Bridge	
2002	Nonfiction	Rick Bragg	Ava's Man	
2003	Children	Carl Hiaasen	Hoot	
2003	Cookbook	Sara Foster	The Foster's Market Cookbook	
2003	Fiction	Sue Monk Kidd	The Secret Life of Bees	
2003	Nonfiction	Pat Conroy	My Losing Season	
2003	Poetry	Kathryn Stripling Byer	Catching Light	
2004	Children	Melinda Long	How I Became a Pirate	
2004	Cookbook	Edna Lewis	The Gift of Southern Cooking	
2004	Fiction	Clyde Edgerton	Lunch at the Piccadilly	
2004	Nonfiction	Deborah Ford	The GRITS Guide to Life	
2004	Poetry	Fred Chappell (ed.)	Locales	
2005	Children	Dave Barry and Ridley Pearson	Peter and the Starcatchers	
2005	Cookbook	Frank Stitt	Frank Stitt's Southern Table	
2005	Fiction	Ron Rash	Saints at the River	
2005	Nonfiction	Celia Rivenbark	We're Just Like You, Only Prettier	
2005	Poetry	Maurice Manning	A Companion for Owls	
2006	Children	Nikki Giovanni (with Bryan Collier)	Rosa	
2006	Cookbook	Gayden Metcalfe and Charlotte Hays	Being Dead is No Excuse	
2006	Fiction	Joshilyn Jackson	Gods in Alabama	
2006	Nonfiction	John Grogan	Marley & Me	
2006	Poetry	Darnell Arnoult	What Travels with Us	
2007	Children	Watt Key	Alabama Moon	
2007	Cookbook	Amy Sedaris	I Like You: Hospitality Under the Influence	
2007	Fiction	Charles Frazier	Thirteen Moons	
2007	Nonfiction	Charles J. Shields	Mockingbird: A Portrait of Harper Lee	
2007	Poetry	Susan Meyers	Keep and Give Away	
2008	Children	Donna Bateman with Brian Lies (illus.)	Deep in the Swamp	
2008	Cookbook	Jean Anderson	A Love Affair with Southern Cooking	
2008	Fiction	Sarah Addison Allen	Garden Spells	
2008	Nonfiction	Barbara Kingsolver	Animal, Vegetable, Miracle	
2008	Poetry	David Kirby	The House On Boulevard Street	
2009	Children	Kirby Larson and Mary Nethery	Two Bobbies	
2009	Cookbook	Martha Hall Foose	Screen Doors and Sweet Tea	
2009	Fiction	Ron Rash	Serena	
2009	Nonfiction	Rick Bragg	The Prince of Frogtown	
2009	Poetry	Kevin Young	Dear Darkness	
2009	Young Adult	Kristin Cashore	Graceling	
2010	Children	Hester Bass	The Secret World of Walter Anderson	
2010	Cookbook	Ted Lee and Matt Lee	The Lee Bros. Simple Fresh Southern	
2010	Fiction	Kathryn Stockett	The Help	
2010	Nonfiction	Rick Bragg	The Most They Ever Had	
2011	Children	Kathryn Erskine	Mockingbird	
2011	Cookbook	Gena Knox	Southern My Way: Simple Recipes, Fresh Flavors	
2011	Fiction	Ron Rash	Burning Bright	
2011	Nonfiction	Jim Minick	The Blueberry Years: A Memoir of Farm and Family	
2011	Poetry	Janisse Ray	A House of Branches	
2011	Young Adult	Deborah Wiles	Countdown	
2012	Children	Mary Quattlebaum	Jo MacDonald Saw a Pond	
2012	Cookbook	Sheri Castle	The New Southern Garden Cookbook	
2012	Fiction	John Hart	Iron House	
2012	Nonfiction	Robert Morgan	Lions of the West	
2012	Poetry	John Lane	Abandoned Quarry	
2012	Young Adult	A. J. Hartley	Darwen Arkwright and the Peregrine Pact	
2013	Children	William Joyce	The Fantastic Flying Books of Mr. Morris Lessmore	
2013	Cookbook	Cheryl Day	The Back in the Day Bakery Cookbook	
2013	Fiction	Wiley Cash	A Land More Kind Than Home	
2013	Nonfiction	Jay Erskine Leutze	Stand Up That Mountain: The Battle to Save One Small Community in the Wilderness Along the Appalachian Trail	
2013	Poetry	Kathryn Stripling Byer	Descent	
2013	Young Adult	Sheila Turnage	Three Times Lucky	
2014	Children	J. E. Thompson	The Girl from Felony Bay	
2014	Cooking	John Currence	Pickles, Pigs & Whiskey: Recipes from My Three Favorite Food Groups and Then Some	
2014	Fiction	Susan Crandall	Whistling Past the Graveyard	
2014	Nonfiction	Sheri Fink	Five Days at Memorial: Life and Death in a Storm-Ravaged Hospital	
2014	Poetry	Cathy Smith Bowers	The Collected Poems of Cathy Smith Bowers	
2014	Young Adult	Sarah Dessen	The Moon and More	
2015	Children	Jacqueline Woodson	Brown Girl Dreaming	
2015	Cooking	Sean Brock	Heritage	
2015	Fiction	Sue Monk Kidd	The Invention of Wings	
2015	Nonfiction	Beth Macy	Factory Man	
2015	Young Adult	Alan Gratz with Brett Helquist (illus.)	League of Seven	

=== Pat Conroy Southern Book Prize ===
Southern Book Prize winners
Year	Category	Author	Title	Ref.
2016	Cookbook	Alice Randall	Soul Food Love	
2016	Fiction	M. O. Walsh	My Sunshine Away	
2016	History & Life Stories	Steve Inskeep	Jacksonland: President Andrew Jackson, Cherokee Chief John Ross, and a Great American Land Grab	
2016	Literary	Ron Rash	Above the Waterfall	
2016	Mystery	Brian Panowich	Bull Mountain	
2016	Nonfiction	Richard Grant	Dispatches from Pluto: Lost and Found in the Mississippi Delta	
2016	Thriller	Greg Isles	The Bone Tree	
2016	Young Adult	David Arnold	Mosquitoland	
2016	Youngsters	Robert Beatty	Serafina and the Black Cloak	
2017	Biography, Autobiography & Memoir	J. Drew Lanham	The Home Place: Memoirs of a Colored Man's Love Affair with Nature	
2017	Cooking	Vivian Howard	Deep Run Roots: Stories & Recipes from My Corner of the South	
2017	Creative Nonfiction	JD Vance	Hillbilly Elegy: A Memoir of a Family and Culture in Crisis	
2017	Fiction (Coming of Age)	Ann Patchett	Commonwealth	
2017	Fiction (Family Life)	Mary Alice Monroe	A Lowcountry Christmas	
2017	Fiction (Historical)	Robert Morgan	Chasing the North Star	
2017	Fiction (Literary)	Julia Franks	Over the Plain Houses	
2017	Juvenile	Donna Gephart	Lily and Dunkin	
2017	Southern Stories & Stories by Southerners	Fannie Flagg	The Whole Town's Talking	
2017	Thriller	John Hart	Redemption Road	
2018	Biography & History	Coretta Scott King	Coretta: My Life, My Love, My Legacy	
2018	Fiction (Literary)	Wiley Cash	The Last Ballad	
2018	Fiction (Women & Family	Gabrielle Zevin	Young Jane Young	
2018	Juvenile Fiction	Renée Ahdieh	Flame in the Mist	
2018	Juvenile Fiction	Cassie Beasley	Tumble & Blue	
2018	Mystery, Thriller, Suspense	J. C. Sasser	Gradle Bird	
2018	Nonfiction	Michael Eric Dyson	Tears We Cannot Stop: A Sermon to White America	
2018	Southern Fiction	Lisa Wingate	Before We Were Yours	
2019	Children's	Jo Hackl	Smack Dab in the Middle of Maybe	
2019	Fiction	David Joy	The Line that Held Us	
2019	Nonfiction	Rick Bragg	The Best Cook in the World	
2020	Children's	Roshani Chokshi	The Gilded Wolves	
2020	Fiction	Jessica Handler	The Magnetic Girl	
2020	Nonfiction	Cassandra King Conroy	Tell Me a Story: My Life With Pat Conroy	
2021	Children's	Derrick Barnes with Gordon C. James	I Am Every Good Thing	
2021	Fiction	Carter Sickels	The Prettiest Star	
2021	Nonfiction	Natasha Trethewey	Memorial Drive	
2022	Children's	Aliya King Neil with Charly Palmer (illus.)	Keep Your Head Up	
2022	Fiction	Wiley Cash	When Ghosts Come Home	
2022	Nonfiction	Margaret Renkl	Graceland, At Last	
2023	Children's	Antwan Eady with Gracey Zhang (illus.)	Nigel and the Moon	
2023	Fiction	Silas House	Lark Ascending	
2023	Nonfiction	Mary Laura Philpott	Bomb Shelter	
2024	Fiction	Ann Patchett	Tom Lake	
2024	Nonfiction	Margaret Renkl	The Comfort of Crows	
2024	Children's and YA	Gillian McDunn	When Sea Becomes Sky	
2025	Fiction	Taylor Brown	Rednecks	
2025	Nonfiction	Annabelle Tometich	The Mango Tree	
2025	Young Readers	Meredith Adamo	Not Like Other Girls	
