= Zanden =

Zanden is a surname. Notable people with the surname include:

- Alice Bier Zandén (born 1995), Danish-Swedish actress, daughter of Philip and niece of Jessica
- Helge Zandén (1886–1972), Swedish painter
- Jessica Zandén (born 1957), Swedish actress, sister of Philip and aunt of Alice
- Mike van der Zanden (born 1987), Dutch swimmer
- Philip Zandén (born 1954), Swedish actor, father of Alice and brother of Jessica
