= Sarah Foster =

Sarah or Sara Foster may refer to:

- Sarah Jane Foster (1839–1868), educator of newly-freed blacks in Martinsburg, West Virginia
- Sara Foster (born 1981), American actress
- Sara Foster (chef), American chef, cookbook author and restaurant owner
- Sarah Foster (athlete), British athlete in the 2006 IAAF World Race Walking Cup
- Sarah Foster (editor), editor of The Minnesota Review

== See also ==
- Sarah Forster (born 1993), Swiss hockey player
