= Family Matters (1993 film) =

- Det bli'r i familien
- Directed by: Susanne Bier
- Written by: Lars Kjeldgaard; Philip Zandén
- Produced by: Vibeke Windeløv; Peter Aalbæk Jensen
- Starring: Philip Zandén; Ghita Nørby; Ernst-Hugo Järegård; Ana Padrao
- Cinematography: Erik Zappon
- Edited by: Pernille Bech Christensen
- Production companies: Svensk Filmindustri; Zentropa; Grupo de Estudios e Realizaçoês; Nordisk Film
- Distributed by: R.G.F. (Denmark); Svensk Filmindustri (Sweden)
- Release dates: 14 September 1993 (Denmark); 7 October 1994 (Sweden)
- Running time: 102 min.
- Countries: Denmark; Sweden; Portugal
- Languages: Danish; Swedish; Portuguese

Family Matters (Danish:Det bli'r i familien) is a 1993 Danish-Swedish-Portuguese drama film directed by Susanne Bier. The film stars Philip Zandén, Ghita Nørby, Ernst-Hugo Järegård, and Ana Padrao.

== Plot ==
On her deathbed Jan's mother tells him that he is adopted and that his biological mother is called Lilli. Jan seeks Lilli, who turns out to be an eccentric actress, and together they taxi to Portugal to find Jim's biological father. The mother and son get to know each other's good and bad sides, and on arrival in the south, Jan finds both the love of his life and his sister.

== Cast ==
- Philip Zandén as Jan
- Ghita Nørby as Jan's mother
- Ernst-Hugo Järegård as Håkon Borelius (as Ernst-Hugo)
- Ana Padrão as Constanca
- Anna Wing as The Grandmother
- Bodil Udsen as Ingrid
- Filipe Ferrer as Frederico
- Claus Nissen as The Taxidriver
- Charlotte Sieling as Nurse
- Birgitte Simonsen as Elisabeth
- Ann Christine Simonsen as Eva (as Ann Kristine Simonsen)
- Henrik Larsen (actor) as Bedemand
- Helene Egelund as Lena
- Isabel de Castro as Abbedisse
- Laurinda Ferreira as Hotel Receptionist

== Themes ==
Family Matters continued exploration of complex, tabooed family relations begun in Freud Leaving Home, including an incestuous relationship between brother and sister.
