= Shelton Laurel massacre =

1863 Confederate killings in the US Civil War

Coordinates: 35.995°N 82.661°W

The Shelton Laurel massacre was a Confederate regiment's execution of 13 accused United States sympathizers on or about January 18, 1863, in the Shelton Laurel Valley of Madison County, North Carolina at the height of the American Civil War. The event sparked outrage from North Carolina Governor Zebulon B. Vance and Solicitor Augustus Merrimon (the latter of whom investigated the event) and was reported in numerous newspapers in northern states and as far away as Europe. While the massacre destroyed the military career and reputation of Lieutenant-Colonel James A. Keith, the adjunct commander who ordered the executions, he was never brought to justice for the incident.

== Background ==
The events leading up to the massacre began in January 1863 when an armed band of Madison County citizens ransacked salt stores in Marshall and looted the home of Confederate Colonel Lawrence Allen, commander of the 64th North Carolina Regiment who was away from home, guarding stockpiles of salt elsewhere. During the war, salt was a precious resource. Brigadier General W.G.M. Davis reported on February 2, "I think the attack on Marshall was gotten up to obtain salt, for want of which there is great suffering in the mountains. Plunder of other property followed as a matter of course." This elicited a response from General William Davis, stationed at nearby Warm Springs (now Hot Springs), who dispatched the 64th under Lieutenant-Colonel Keith (Allen was ill at the time) to the Shelton Laurel Valley to pursue the looters (Keith, like much of the 64th, was a native of Madison County). By this point in the war, the 64th North Carolina Regiment had lost nearly two-thirds of its original force from combat and desertion. In the skirmish that followed, 12 looters were killed, and several were captured. Upon hearing of the events, Governor Vance (who grew up in nearby Weaverville) sent orders not to harm the captured Unionists and dispatched Solicitor Merrimon to monitor the situation.

== Massacre ==
Despite the governor's orders, Keith, believing a rumor that the Unionist force was much larger than in reality, began frantically combing the valley for Union supporters. For Keith, being a native of Marshall made this issue personal. Keith's troops moved on Shelton Laurel from two directions. While Keith led his column down from the high crest at the top of the valley, Colonel Allen brought his men up the opposite end of the valley. Hidden locals fired on Allen's men with occasional gunfire. In the returning fire, Allen's soldiers killed eight men.

Once the soldiers reached the home of Bill Shelton, they encountered over 50 riflemen. The ensuing combat left six of the defenders dead. While Allen and his troops awaited Colonel Keith's column, the news was received that Allen's 6-year-old son Romulus had died of scarlet fever. Upon his return to Marshall, Allen discovered that his 4-year-old daughter Margaret was dying. Allen was quick to blame the looters who had ransacked his house previously. The next day he buried his children and returned immediately to Shelton Laurel. With Allen, fueled by grief and the desire for vengeance, reunited with Keith, the two realized that the locals were unlikely to volunteer information. Keith rounded up several Shelton Laurel women and began torturing them to force them to give up their sons' and husbands' whereabouts. They hanged and whipped Mrs. Unus Riddle, a woman of 85. They hanged Mary and Sarah Shelton by their necks until they were nearly dead. The Memphis Bulletin reports: "Old Mrs. Sallie Moore, seventy years of age, was whipped with hickory rods till the blood ran in streams down her back to the ground. … Martha White, an idiotic girl, was beaten and tied by the neck all day to a tree." The soldiers burnt homes and slaughtered livestock. After several days of rounding up alleged supporters, Keith began marching the captives toward East Tennessee, which was occupied by a substantial Confederate army at the time. However, after two prisoners escaped, Keith ordered the remaining 13 into the woods and had 5 shot execution-style. Their bodies were dumped into a nearby trench. Among the executed were three boys, ages 13, 14, and 17. Joe Woods, an elderly man of 60, said "For God's sake, men, you are not going to shoot us? If you are going to murder us, give us at least time to pray." Keith responded, "There's no time for praying." The soldier hesitated before shooting the horrified captives, prompting Keith to bellow, "Fire or you will take their place!" The soldiers fired, and four men were killed instantly; one required a second shot. The next five men were made to kneel, and after the shots were fired again, one man remained alive. It was 13-year-old David Shelton who clutched the legs of an officer and begged, "You have killed my old father and three brothers, you have shot me in both arms. … I forgive you all this — I can get well. … Let me go home to my mother and sisters." David Shelton was shot eight more times.

== Investigations and legal consequences ==
Stunned by the incident, Attorney General Augustus S. Merrimon reported it to Governor Vance shortly after that. He wrote, "I learned that all this was done by order of Lieut. Col. James A. Keith. I know not what you intend doing with the guilty parties, but I suggest they are all guilty of murder [...] Such savage and barbarous cruelty is without parallel in the State, and I hope in every other." The governor wrote that the affair was "shocking and outrageous in the extreme," and ordered a full investigation. Family members of the slain (mostly Sheltons) discovered that the bodies were being eaten by wild pigs and moved the bodies to a new cemetery east of the massacre site. They swore revenge against the perpetrators.

Fearful of reprisal for his actions, Keith fled the region and avoided state and Confederate authorities for the remainder of the war. Colonel Allen, who was not officially in command, but heavily involved in the tragedy, was given six months' suspension by the Army. Five widows of murdered men from Shelton Laurel petitioned Congress for pensions. Their petition died in committee.

In 1866, the North Carolina General Assembly passed the Amnesty Act, which granted criminal immunity to all official acts committed during the war. In March 1868, the state constitutional convention then sitting in Raleigh declared the Amnesty Act repealed. Accordingly, in November 1868, the solicitor in Madison County secured an indictment against Keith for the murder of Roderick Shelton. The court vacated Keith of any criminal liability, deciding that the convention was limited in its scope of action by the U.S. Constitution and that the repeal of the Amnesty Act amounted to unconstitutional ex post facto legislation. As such, Keith had acted in his official role as a Confederate military officer and thus was subject to relief under the terms of the Amnesty Act.

== Legacy ==
=== Commemoration ===
A North Carolina Highway Historical marker recalling the massacre stands in the vicinity of the massacre site at the modern intersection of state highways 208 and 212. The graves of the slain are in a cemetery just off Highway 212, further up the valley.

=== Popular culture ===
Massacre at Shelton Laurel, a short film written and directed by Jay Stone, was shot in the fall of 2001 in Rutherfordton, North Carolina. The film was selected Best Docudrama at the International Student Film Festival Hollywood in 2004. It was selected to screen at the 2006 Carolina Film & Video Festival, the 2006 Asheville Film Festival, the George Lindsey UNA Film Festival in March 2006, and the 2006 Film Celebration at Piedmont Community College in May 2006.

Events of the Shelton Laurel massacre are described in The World Made Straight, by Ron Rash, a fiction book about western North Carolina during the 1970s. The novel was developed into a film by the same title, released in 2015.

Charles Frazier, the author of Cold Mountain, studied the Shelton Laurel massacre in depth during research for the book and paralleled many of the events therein. During the massacre, one soldier tied a woman to a tree while her baby was disrobed and left exposed to the snow unless she gave up information. Frazier recreates this scene in Cold Mountain when Sara encounters U.S. Army soldiers. When the Confederates initially raided the Laurel Valley, they arrested fifteen men, two escaped, and thirteen were executed in the woods. Of the executed, the youngest was 13, and the oldest was sixty-six. In Cold Mountain, Frazier recreates the horror, ""A captive boy, not much older than twelve, fell to his knees and commenced crying. An old man, grey headed, said, "You can't mean to kill us". When the soldiers were forced to execute the elderly and children at Shelton Laurel many of them initially refused and were threatened with death by their superiors. Frazier's Cold Mountain details one soldier's opinion on the matter, "I didn't sign on to kill grandpaws and little boys." After the horrific events at Shelton Laurel family members discovered the shallow grave of their relatives was being exhumed and eaten by wild hogs. When Inman awakens in the novel he discovers "feral hogs descended from the woods, drawn by the tang of the air. They plowed at the ground with their snouts and dug out arms and feet". When the captors at Shelton Laurel captured Henry and George Grooms they asked Henry to play a tune on his fiddle before his execution. He played "Bonaparte's Retreat". Before Stobrod is executed in Cold Mountain, Teague asks him to play a song. Strobrod plays "a piece slightly reminiscent of Bonaparte's Retreat". Many of the guards had a difficult time executing Mitchell Caldwell because he was mentally handicapped and would not stop smiling. The soldiers forced Mitchell to cover his face with his hat because they could not shoot anyone with a grin on their face. When the soldiers execute the simpleton Pangle, in Cold Mountain, one soldier says "I can't shoot a man grinning at me… Take your hat off" and "Hold it over your face".

== See also ==
- List of massacres in North Carolina

== Works cited ==
- Williard, David C. (February 2019). "Criminal Amnesty, State Courts, and the Reach of Reconstruction". The Journal of Southern History. 85 (1): 105–136. JSTOR 26641765.
