= Susanne Bier =

Danish film director

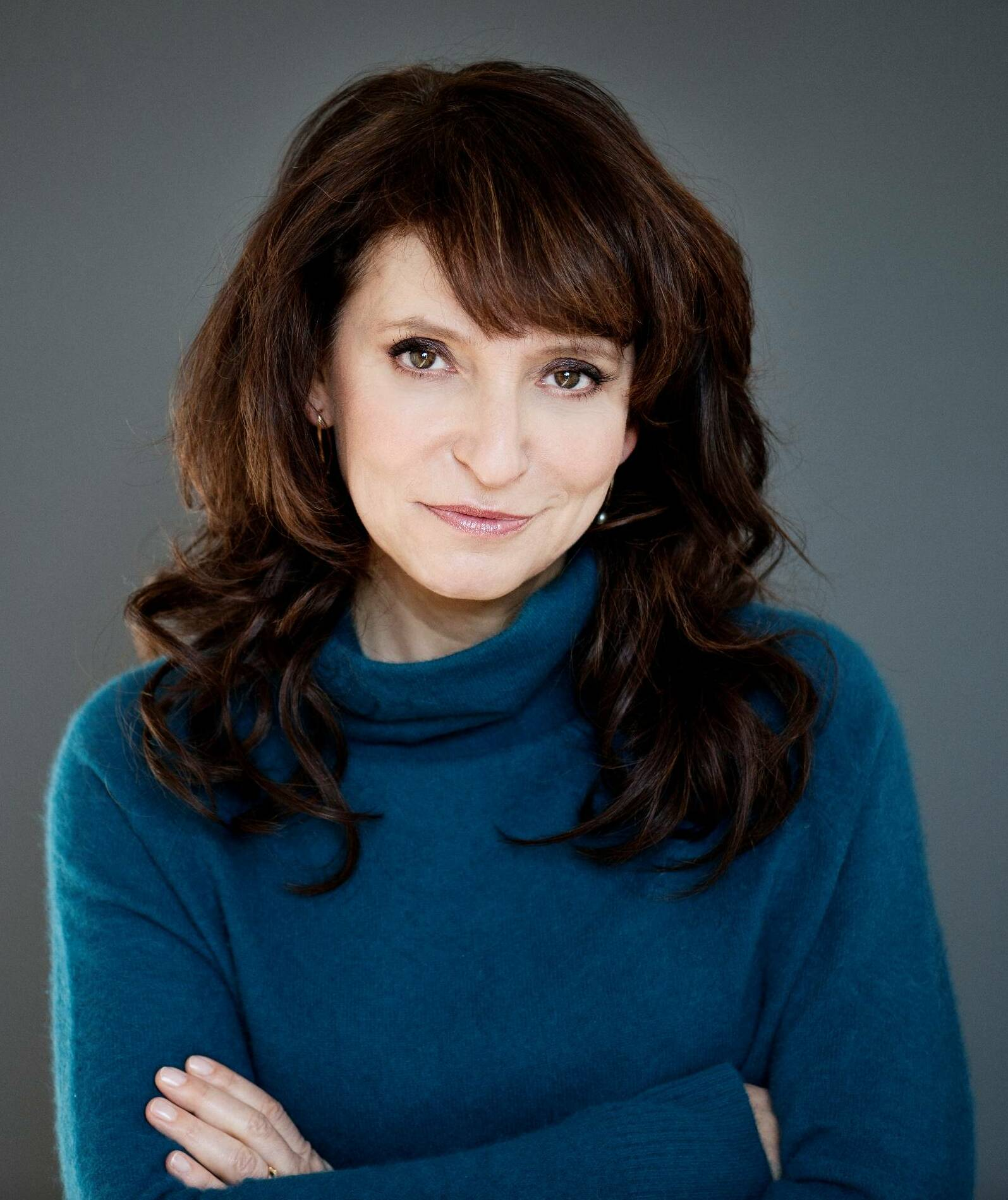
- Bier in 2011
- Born: 15 April 1960 (age 66); Copenhagen, Denmark
- Education: Bezalel Academy of Arts and Design, Architectural Association in London, National Film School of Denmark
- Occupations: Director; writer; producer
- Years active: 1991–present
- Spouse(s): Tómas Gislason (198?–?; divorced); Philip Zandén (1995–?; divorced); Jesper Winge Leisner (?-present)
- Children: Gabriel Bier Gislason, Alice Bier Zandén

Susanne Bier (Danish: [suˈsænə ˈpiɐ̯ˀ]; born 15 April 1960) is a Danish filmmaker. Bier is the first female director to collectively receive an Academy Award (Foreign Film), a Golden Globe Award, a European Film Award (for In a Better World) and a Primetime Emmy Award (for directing The Night Manager).

Bier made her feature film debut with Freud Leaving Home (1991). She has directed a string of films including Open Hearts (2002), Brothers (2004), After the Wedding (2006), and In a Better World (2010), where In a Better World won the Academy Award for Best International Feature Film. She directed the English-language films Things We Lost in the Fire (2007), Love Is All You Need (2012), Serena (2014), Bird Box (2018), and Practical Magic 2 (2026).

On television, she directed the BBC One / AMC miniseries The Night Manager (2016) earning the Primetime Emmy Award for Outstanding Directing for a Limited or Anthology Series or Movie. She also directed the HBO psychological miniseries The Undoing (2020), the Showtime historical anthology series The First Lady (2022), and the Netflix mystery series The Perfect Couple (2024).

== Early life and education ==
Susanne Bier was born to a Jewish family in Copenhagen, Denmark on 15 April 1960. The family of her father, Rudolf Salomon Bier (born 1930), emigrated from Germany to Denmark in 1933 after Hitler's rise to power. The family of her mother, Heni (née Jonas; born 1936), emigrated to Denmark from Russia at the beginning of the 20th century, to escape rising antisemitism. In 1943, the two families fled from Denmark to Sweden, together with most Danish Jews, to escape the deportation to the Nazi death camps. Three years after the end of World War II, they returned to Denmark. The effects of the Holocaust caused Bier's parents to instill the strong moral values and principles into their children. Later, the importance of human resilience and dignity would be a recurring theme in her films.

During her schooling, she attended Niels Steensens Gymnasium. In interviews for the media as an adult, Bier describes herself as lacking in social skills as a child, who liked to play football with boys and preferred reading books to interacting with others. After high school, citing a desire to reconnect with her Jewish roots, she studied art at the Bezalel Academy of Arts and Design in Jerusalem. Later she would study architecture at the Architectural Association in London before finally returning to film and graduating from the National Film School of Denmark in 1987. De Saliges (1987), Bier's graduation film, won first prize at the Munich film school festival and was subsequently distributed by Channel Four.

== Career ==
=== 1990–1999: early work and film debut ===
After directing music videos, commercials and the feature films Freud Flytter Hjemmefra (Freud's Leaving Home, 1990), Det Bli'r i Familien (Family Matters, 1993), Pensionat Oscar (Like it Was Never Before, 1995) and Sekten (Credo, 1997), Bier made a breakthrough in her home country of Denmark with the film The One and Only in 1999. A romantic comedy about the fragility of life, the film won a clutch of Danish Film Academy awards and established Bier's relationship with actress Paprika Steen. The film remains one of the most successful domestic films ever released in Denmark.

A sidestep from the easy going charm of Livet är en schlager (Once in a Lifetime, 2000), Elsker dig for evigt (Open Hearts, 2002) brought Bier's work to much wider international attention and acclaim. Acutely observed and beautifully written by Bier and Anders Thomas Jensen, the film is a perceptive and painful exploration of broken lives and interconnected tragedies. Made under Dogme 95 regulations, the film also marked a move towards a more minimalist aesthetic.

Since the completion of Open Hearts, Bier's reputation has continued to ascend with the harrowing Brødre (Brothers, 2004) and the emotionally engaging Efter Brylluppet (After the Wedding, 2006), which was nominated for Best Foreign Language film at the 2007 Academy Awards. After her first American film, Things We Lost in the Fire (2008) starring Benicio del Toro and Halle Berry, Bier went on to win the Oscar for Best Foreign Language film for In a Better World (2010).

Also a maker of shorts, music videos and commercials, Bier's films typically meditate on pain, tragedy, and atonement. Bier is signed as a commercial director with international production company, SMUGGLER. After graduation, Bier was invited to Sweden to direct Freud Leaving Home, which was critically acclaimed by film critics. The film follows a girl, Freud, from Sweden who comes from a Jewish family, and it became the first feature film in Sweden to depict Swedish-Jewish culture. With its heavily Jewish focus, the film "addresses the Jewish experience to an extent that is in rare in Scandinavian cinema". The film won ten awards and was nominated for an additional three. Her next film Family Matters continued exploration of complex, tabooed family relations begun in Freud Leaving Home, including an incestuous relationship between brother and sister. Bier returned to taboo subjects with the film The One and Only in 1999. The film is a Danish romantic comedy starring Sidse Babett Knudsen, Niels Olsen, Rafael Edholm, and Paprika Steen in a story about two unfaithful married couples faced with becoming first-time parents. The film was considered to mark a modern transition in Danish romantic comedies, The film earned both the Robert Award and Bodil Award as the Best Film of 1999.

=== 2000–2014: rise to prominence and acclaim ===
Following the influence of Dogme 95 manifesto, Bier directed the film Open Hearts in 2002. Open Hearts tells the story of two couples whose lives are traumatized by a car crash and adultery. Open Hearts received a 96% approval rating on Rotten Tomatoes movie review website. Susanne Bier received the International Critics Award at the 2002 Toronto International Film Festival. The film won both the Bodil and Robert awards for Best Danish Film in 2003.

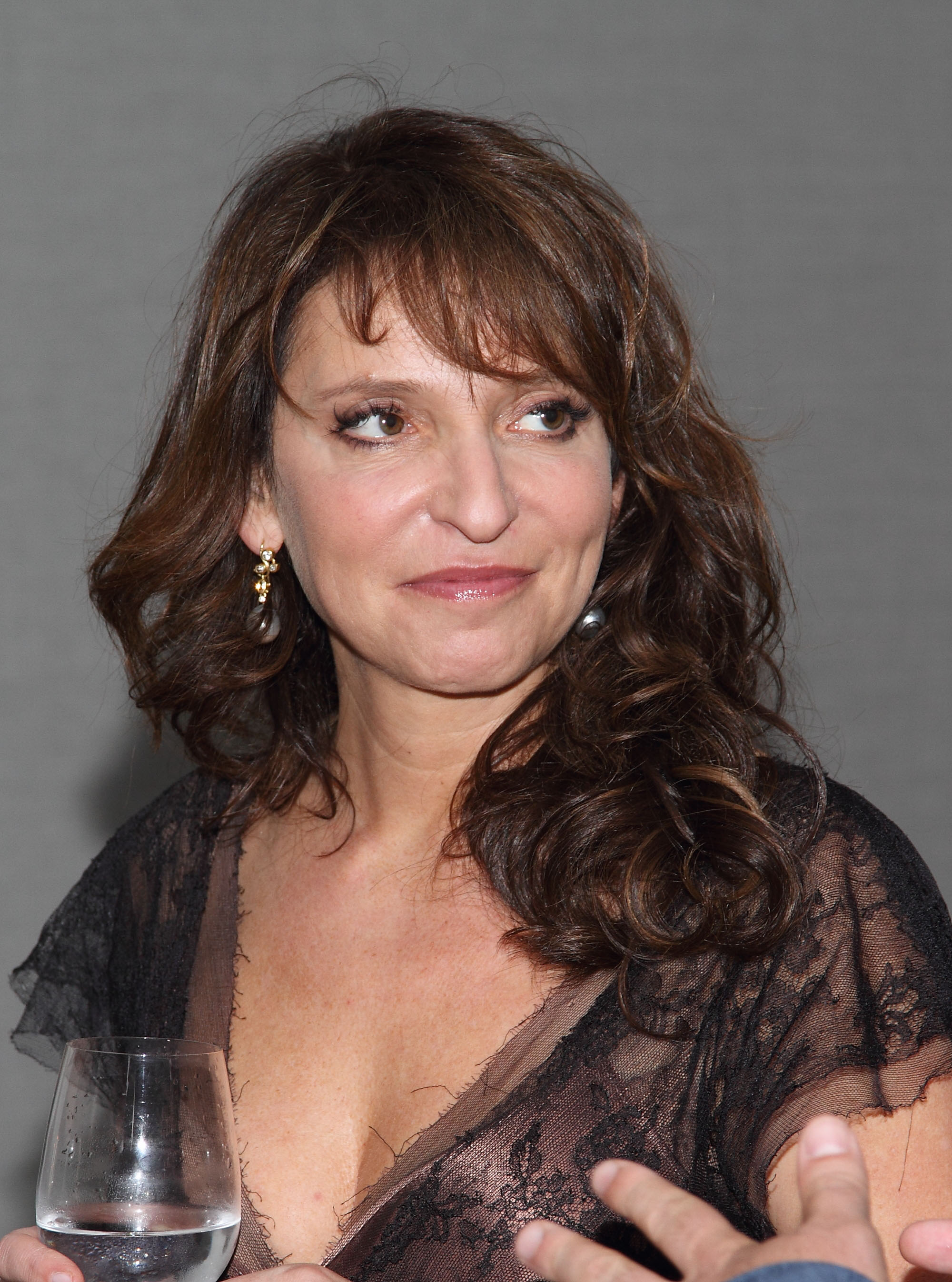
Bier in 2009

In Bier's next film Brothers (2004) we follow the story of two brothers, Michael and Jannik. The character of Michael has a promising military career, a beautiful wife and two beautiful girls; Michael is shown preparing for a deployment to Afghanistan early in the movie. His younger brother, Jannik, has recently been imprisoned for an attempted bank robbery. Michael picked up Jannik from prison the day before being deployed to Afghanistan; their already strained relationship is shown to be especially tense. While in Afghanistan, Michael's helicopter is shot down- all soldiers are presumed dead, but Michael and a fellow soldier below him are imprisoned. Michael is ultimately forced to kill his fellow soldier. Sarah is supported by Jannik who, against all odds, takes care of the family. Soon, Sarah and Jannik become closer as he fulfills the space/role previously held by his brother. Michael is ultimately rescued by US forces and is able to return home, but to disastrous results. The film tackles the theme of the war in Afghanistan in 2001 and the psychological aftermath of prisoners of war. The plot shows inspiration from Homer's Odyssey. It won several awards, including the audience award at the 2005 Sundance Film Festival and the Cannes Film Festival UCMF Movie Music Award. An opera based on the story of the film by Icelandic composer Daníel Bjarnason was premiered in Aarhus on 16 August 2017. It was commissioned by Den Jyske Opera. Kerstin Perski wrote the libretto and the director was Kasper Holten. To celebrate Aarhus as the European capital of culture 2017 three stage works were produced; a musical, dance and an opera all based on films by Bier were commissioned and performed in Musikhuset.

Bier's next film tells the story of Jacob Petersen who manages an Indian orphanage. With a small staff, he works as hard as he can to keep the orphanage afloat and is personally invested in the young charges - in particular, Pramod, a young boy Jacob has cared for since the boy's birth. The film was a critical and popular success and was nominated for the Academy Award for Best Foreign Language Film. Time magazine's Richard Schickel named the film one of the Top 10 Movies of 2007, ranking it at #4, calling it a "dark, richly mounted film". While Schickel saw the film as possibly "old-fashioned stylistically, and rather manipulative in its plotting", he also saw "something deeply satisfying in the way it works out the fates of its troubled, yet believable characters." The film was remade as the English-language After the Wedding in 2019, starring Julianne Moore, Michelle Williams, and Billy Crudup.

In this film we follow the character of Audrey who has been married for eleven years with Brian and leads a well-to-do life, but suddenly her husband dies after trying to defend a woman from an assault. Left alone with two children, Audrey has to face the terrible pain of loss, so she decides to welcome Jerry, her friend's friend, with problems of drug addiction. The two will establish a relationship that will force them to unite their pains, helping each other to make a change in their lives, the difficult search for happiness. Critics gave the film generally favorable reviews. As of 29 January 2008 on the review aggregator Rotten Tomatoes, 64% of critics gave the film positive reviews, based on 117 reviews. On Metacritic, the film had an average score of 63 out of 100, based on 30 reviews. The two leads received praise for their performances, particularly Benicio Del Toro as he received immense acclaim for his portrayal of Jerry, considered one of his best roles to date.

In a Better World (Danish: Hævnen, "the revenge") is a 2010 Danish drama thriller film written by Anders Thomas Jensen and directed by Susanne Bier. The film stars Mikael Persbrandt, Trine Dyrholm, and Ulrich Thomsen in a story which takes place in small-town Denmark and a refugee camp in Africa. A Danish majority production with co-producers in Sweden, In a Better World won the 2011 Golden Globe Award for Best Foreign Language Film as well as the award for Best Foreign Language Film at the 83rd Academy Awards. Director Susanne Bier said: "Our experiment in this film is about looking at how little it really takes before a child – or an adult – thinks something is deeply unjust. It really doesn't take much, and I find that profoundly interesting. And scary." Review aggregator Rotten Tomatoes reports that 77% out of 114 professional critics gave the film a positive review, with the site consensus stating that "In a Better World is a sumptuous melodrama that tackles some rather difficult existential and human themes." Metacritic gave the film a score of 65, indicating "generally favorable reviews".

Kim Skotte called the film a "powerful and captivating drama" in Politiken. Out of the four collaborations between Jensen and Bier, he considered In a Better World to be the one most similar to Jensen's solo films and compared the combination of biblical themes and high entertainment value to Jensen's 2005 film Adam's Apples. Peter Nielsen of Dagbladet Information called In a Better World "in all ways a successful film", and although there "is no doubt that Susanne Bier can tell a good story", he was not entirely convinced: "She can seduce, and she can push the completely correct emotional buttons, so that mothers' as well as fathers' hearts are struck, but she doesn't earnestly drill her probe into the meat."

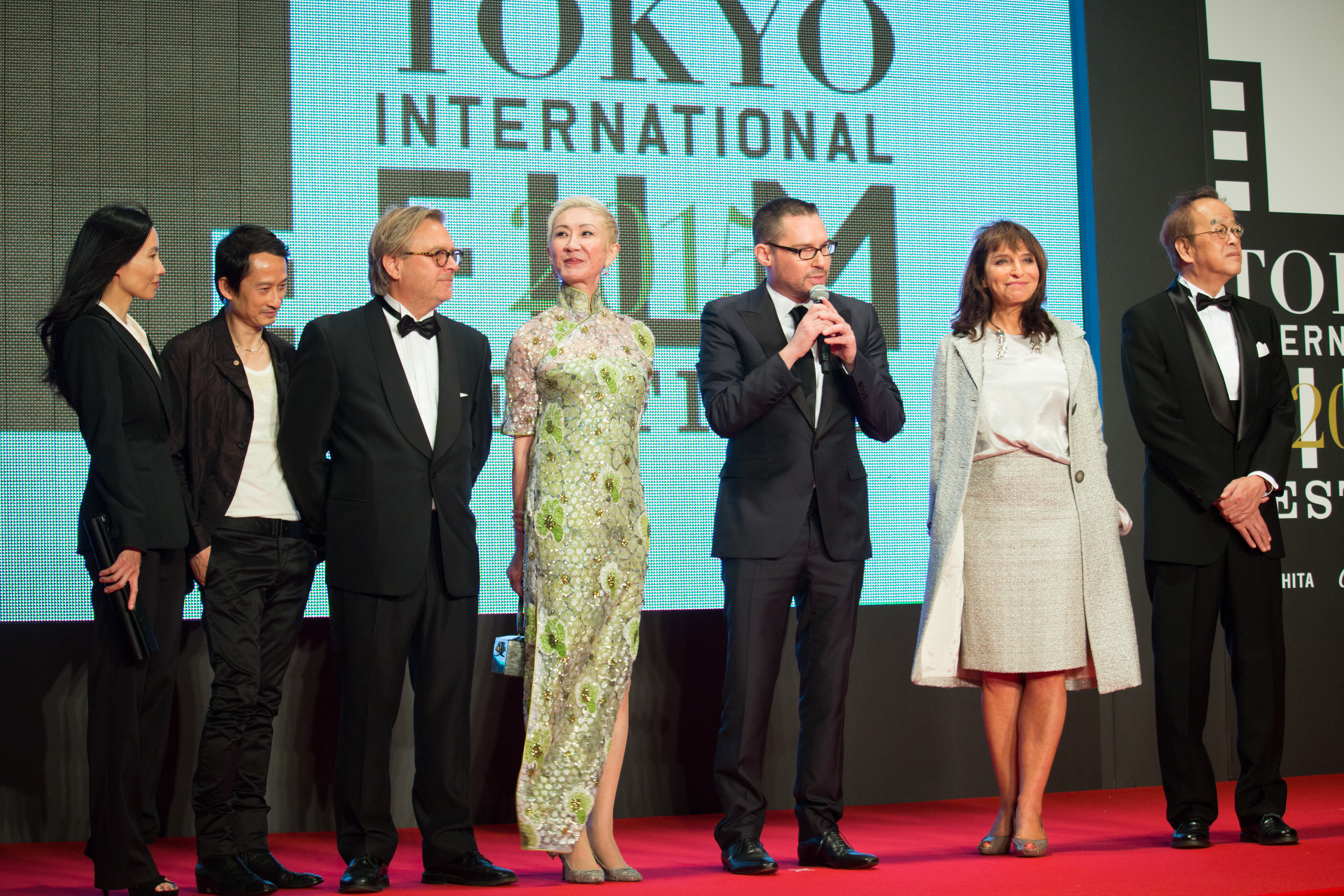
Bier at the Tokyo International Film Festival in 2015

In 2012, Bier directed Den skaldede frisør (Love is All You Need), a 2012 Danish romantic comedy film starring Pierce Brosnan and Trine Dyrholm. In 2013 she was a member of the jury at the 63rd Berlin International Film Festival. In 2014, she directed her second American feature, dark romantic drama Serena starring Jennifer Lawrence and Bradley Cooper, and shortly after followed up with Danish drama A Second Chance starring Nikolaj Coster-Waldau, Ulrich Thomsen, Nikolaj Lie Kaas and Maria Bonnevie. In 2013, Love Is All You Need was selected as best comedy film at the 26th European Film Awards.

In 2014, Bier directed Serena, based on the 2008 novel of the same name by American author Ron Rash. The film stars Jennifer Lawrence and Bradley Cooper as newlyweds running a timber business in 1930s North Carolina. Serena has received negative reviews from critics. On Rotten Tomatoes, the film has a score of 16% based on 106 reviews with an average rating of 4.3/10. The website's critical consensus states "Serena unites an impressive array of talent on either side of the cameras – then leaves viewers to wonder how it all went so wrong." On Metacritic the film has a score of 36 out of 100 based on reviews from 29 critics, indicating "generally unfavorable reviews". In 2014, Bier directed A Second Chance (Danish: En chance til), a Danish thriller film. The film stars Nikolaj Coster-Waldau, Ulrich Thomsen, Maria Bonnevie, Nikolaj Lie Kaas and Lykke May Andersen. It was screened in the Special Presentations section of the 2014 Toronto International Film Festival.

=== 2016–present: television work ===
Taking a break from film, Bier directed The Night Manager, a British television serial starring Tom Hiddleston, Hugh Laurie, Olivia Colman, David Harewood, Tom Hollander, and Elizabeth Debicki. It is based on the 1993 novel of the same name by John le Carré and adapted to the present day by David Farr. The six-part series began broadcasting on BBC One on 21 February 2016. In the United States, it began on 19 April 2016 on AMC. It has been sold internationally to over 180 countries, and a second series was commissioned by the BBC and AMC. Scripting duties for the second series were handled by Matthew Orton, Charles Cumming, Namsi Khan and Francesca Gardiner. The first series of The Night Manager was nominated for 36 awards and won 11, including two Primetime Emmy Awards (for director Bier and music composer Victor Reyes) and three Golden Globe Awards (for Hiddleston, Colman, and Laurie).

The series received widespread critical acclaim. Adam Sisman, le Carré's biographer, wrote in UK daily newspaper The Daily Telegraph, "It is more than 20 years since the novel was published, and in that time two film companies have tried and failed to adapt it, concluding that it was impossible to compress into two hours. But this six-hour television adaptation is long enough to give the novel its due." He added, "And though Hugh Laurie may seem a surprising choice to play 'the worst man in the world', he dominates the screen as a horribly convincing villain. Alert viewers may spot a familiar face in the background of one scene, in a restaurant: John le Carré himself makes a cameo, as he did in the films of A Most Wanted Man and Tinker Tailor Soldier Spy. But he is on screen only for an instant: blink and you'll miss him."

Returning to film, Bier directed Bird Box, an American post-apocalyptic horror film. The screenplay, by Eric Heisserer, was based on the 2014 novel of the same name by Josh Malerman. The film stars Sandra Bullock, and had its world premiere at AFI Fest on 12 November 2018. It was released worldwide on 21 December 2018 by Netflix, and went on to become the most-watched film in Netflix history. On Metacritic, Bird Box has received mixed to positive reviews. Forbes called it a "truly terrible movie".

Bier directed the TV series The Undoing, which premiered on HBO in October 2020 and starred Nicole Kidman and Hugh Grant. The Undoing became the first HBO original series to grow its audience each week and the network's most watched show of 2020.

In 2022, Bier directed the Showtime limited series The First Lady, starring Viola Davis, Michelle Pfieffer, and Gillian Anderson. In 2024, Bier directed the limited TV series The Perfect Couple, based on the 2018 novel of the same name by Elin Hilderbrand, for Netflix starring Nicole Kidman, Liev Schreiber, Dakota Fanning, Eve Hewson and Ishaan Khatter.

In 2026, Bier directed Practical Magic 2, a sequel to 1998's Practical Magic, for Warner Bros. Pictures marking her second collaboration with Sandra Bullock and Nicole Kidman.

== Style and themes ==
Bier's films often deal with the traditional family framework, with the collapse of the bourgeois middle class under the pressure of globalization, terrorism, and war, and the way in which people deal with a disaster or a formative event outside their lives. She notes that the moment that interests her in characters' lives is when their sense of security cracks and the outside world knocks on the door. The main questions in her films are questions of morality: whether it is moral to leave a partner who has become disabled, whether personal good precedes the general good, and how to respond to the violence directed at the individual. Bier often raises questions about how far one would go for a child is in distress, if social services appear to be unable or unwilling to help, and the limits one exceeds to get their own desires fulfilled.

Bier's style of direction gives the players a great deal of freedom, allowing improvisation in both texts and presentation. Her films have a common visual code - all of them are filmed in a shoulder camera, and emotional peaks use extreme close-ups of eyes, lips, and fingers. In addition, the editing method is not faithful to the continuous editing tradition, and it adds to a more free and random feeling.

Bier's films are characterized by the fact that, despite their tragic structure, there is a "flattening" of the dramatic events, or, alternatively, no dramatization of the major events. For example, in the scene of the first encounter between the father and his daughter in After the Wedding, the two of them are silent for most of the scene, and talk about a bottle of water he brings to her. This style of direction creates the feeling that nothing happens in her films, but a thorough analysis of the events shows that the films are faithful to the dramatic structure of the theatre of ancient Greece.

Moreover, Bier makes sure to finish her films with a slightly optimistic tone, saying that although her films are not purely commercial, they are also not pure art, and therefore she should communicate with her audience and give them some light to lean on.

== Influences ==
In Susan King's article, Bier claims her Jewish heritage embedded a strong sense of family in conjunction to a sense of instability and turmoil. This pertains to her father's need to flee Germany in 1933 to Denmark, where he met Bier's mother. The two of them fled by boat to Sweden after Nazis began rounding up Jews in Denmark. Originally, Bier imagined herself married to a nice Jewish man with six children. She later decided that she wanted to pursue a career. She has been married twice and has two children, Gabriel and Alice. Despite this, she still holds family as her biggest influence and claims she would have never become a filmmaker without her children. To Bier, "family is a sense of identity". "I speak to my parents every day. I have a very close relationship to my aunts and uncles, but also my ex-husband…who comes to stay with us. I have this almost obsessive desire to whomever is close to me, I want to have a very intense, close, intimate relationship with them. That way of living definitely informs the stories I tell."Although she frequently depicts international stories in third world countries, Bier had never been to Africa or India until she started making movies there. On her frequent interest and depiction of the Third World, Bier insists that "it is sort of pointing out that the Third World is really a part of our lives. It is unavoidable, and we need to relate to it…" As she writes in a public letter after winning the Oscar for In a Better World, "My particular world is not just Copenhagen. It had to be broader than this. My world is larger than it used to be." In Sylvaine Gold's article, Bier claims she doesn't like to be in a state of comfort when working. Typically in her films, happy and comfortable characters are met by situations of extreme sadness and catastrophe. She attributes this obsession to her parents experience during World War II when "society suddenly turned against them" because they were Jewish. Despite this obsession with tragedy, Bier says "I've had a very fortunate, very privileged life [but] I say that with all humility, because it could change tomorrow. But I have a very strong ability to empathize, to understand what things feel like." Her frequent writing collaborator Anders Thomas Jensen confirms this "humanness" in her, that "She's very good at putting herself in a character's place, which is really a gift." Bier also insists that despite her negative depictions in her films, she always wants to end a film with some vestige of hope. She never wants to alienate her audience, that it is always key to "have an ability to communicate".

== Personal life ==
Bier first married the Danish-Icelandic film director Tómas Gislason (da), with whom she had a son, Gabriel Bier Gislason (born 1989), who also works in the film industry. With her second husband, the Swedish actor and director Philip Zandén, she had a daughter, the actress Alice Bier Zandén (born 1995)

Following her divorce from Zandén, her partner is the Danish singer and composer Jesper Winge Leisner (da), who wrote the music for several of her films.

== Filmography ==
=== Film ===
Year	English title	Original title	Director	Writer	Producer	Notes
1989	Notes on Love	Notater om kærligheden	No	Additional	No	Also assistant director
1991	Freud Leaving Home	Freud flyttar hemifrån...	Yes	Additional	No	Directorial debut
1992		Brev til Jonas	Yes	No	No	Cameo as "Director"; short film
1993	Family Matters	Det bli'r i familien	Yes	No	No	
1995	Like It Never Was Before	Pensionat Oskar	Yes	No	No	
1997	Credo	Sekten	Yes	Yes	No	
1999	The One and Only	Den eneste ene	Yes	Idea	Executive	
2000	Once in a Lifetime	Livet är en schlager	Yes	No	No	
2002	Open Hearts	Elsker dig for evigt	Yes	Yes	No	
2004	Brothers	Brødre	Yes	Story	No	
2006	After the Wedding	Efter brylluppet	Yes	Story	No	
2007	Things We Lost in the Fire		Yes	No	No	
2010	In a Better World	Hævnen	Yes	Story	No	
2012	Love Is All You Need	Den skaldede frisør	Yes	Story	No	
2014	A Second Chance	En chance til	Yes	Story	No	
2014	Serena		Yes	No	Yes	
2018	Bird Box		Yes	No	Executive	
2026	Practical Magic 2		Yes	No	No	

=== Television ===
Year	Title	Director	Producer	Story Editor	Notes	Ref.
1988	Fridtjof Nansens fodspor over Indlandsisen	No	No	Yes	Television documentary film	
1993	Luischen	Yes	No	No	Television film	
2016	The Night Manager	Yes	Yes	No	Miniseries (6 episodes)	
2020	The Undoing	Yes	Yes	No	Miniseries (6 episodes)	
2022	The First Lady	Yes	Yes	No	Miniseries (10 episodes)	
2024	The Perfect Couple	Yes	Yes	No	Miniseries (6 episodes)	

=== Music video ===
Year	Title	Musician	Notes	Ref.
1989	Summer Rain	Alphaville		

== Awards and nominations ==
Freud's Leaving Home (Freud flytter hjemmefra...) (1991)

- 1992 Angers European First Film Festival
  - Audience Award: Feature Film
  - C.I.C.A.E. Award
- 1992 Creteil International Women's Film Festival
  - Grand Prix
- 1992 Guldbagge Awards
  - Best Director (Nominated)
- 1991 Montréal World Film Festival
  - Montréal First Film Prize – Special Mention

Brev til Jonas (1992)

- 1993 Robert Festival
  - Best Short/Documentary (Årets kort/dokumentarfilm)

Family Matters (Det bli'r i familien) (1994)

- 1994 Rouen Nordic Film Festival
  - ACOR Award
  - Audience Award

Like It Never Was Before (Pensionat Oskar) (1995)

- 1995 Montréal World Film Festival
  - FIPRESCI Prize: Official Competition

The One and Only (Den eneste ene) (1999)

- 2000 Robert Festival
  - Best Film (Årets danske spillefilm)
- 2000 Bodil Awards
  - Best Film (Bedste danske film)

Open Hearts (Elsker dig for evigt) (2002)

- 2002 Toronto International Film Festival
  - International Critics' Award (FIPRESCI) – Special Mention
- 2003 Bodil Awards
  - Best Film (Bedste danske film)
- 2002 Lübeck Nordic Film Days
  - Baltic Film Prize for a Nordic Feature Film
- 2003 Robert Festival
  - Audience Award
- 2003 Rouen Nordic Film Festival
  - Press Award

Brothers (Brødre) (2004)

- 2005 Boston Independent Film Festival
  - Audience Award: Narrative
- 2005 Creteil International Women's Film Festival
  - Audience Award: Best Feature Film
- 2004 Hamburg Film Festival
  - Critics Award
- 2005 Skip City International D-Cinema Festival
  - Grand Prize
- 2005 Sundance Film Festival
  - Audience Award: World Cinema – Dramatic

After the Wedding (Efter brylluppet) (2006)

- 2007 Festroia International Film Festival
  - Jury Special Prize
- 2006 Film by the Sea International Film Festival
  - Audience Award
- 2006 Cinefest Sudbury International Film Festival
  - Audience Award

In a Better World (Hævnen) (2010)

- 2011 Academy Awards
  - Best Foreign Language Film
- 2011 European Film Awards
  - Best Director
- 2011 Golden Globes, Italy
  - Best European Film (Miglior Film Europeo)
- 2010 Rome Film Festival
  - Audience Award
  - Grand Jury Prize

Love is All You Need (Den skaldede frisør) (2012)

- 2013 Robert Festival
  - Audience Award: Comedy

The Night Manager (2016)

- 2016 Primetime Emmy Awards
  - Outstanding Directing for a Limited Series, Movie, or Dramatic Special
