= The Cove (novel) =

2012 book by Ron Rash

- First edition
- Author: Ron Rash
- Cover artist: Allison Saltzman
- Language: English
- Publisher: Ecco Press
- Publication date: April 10, 2012
- Publication place: United States
- Media type: Print
- ISBN: 9780061804199
- OCLC: 765971121

The Cove is a 2012 novel by American author Ron Rash. It is Rash's fifth novel, his most acclaimed novel being the New York Times bestseller, Serena (2008). The Cove was listed as #16 on the New York Times Bestseller list for Hardcover Fiction in the April 29, 2012 issue of The New York Times Book Review and remained on the list as #29, #22, and #31 for the three subsequent weeks.

== Plot ==
=== Part One (Ch. 1–5) ===
The novel takes place in the Appalachian Mountains of North Carolina in 1918. Laurel Shelton lives in the cove with her brother Hank, who has just returned home from fighting in World War I and is missing a hand. Laurel stumbles, unnoticed, upon a man sitting alone in the woods playing a flute. A visit by Laurel to her parents' graves reveal that she and her brother are both orphans; their deaths contributed to the local belief that Laurel is a witch. Laurel is cruelly treated by the locals, especially when Jubel Parton had sex with her as a bet. When Laurel again spots a man in the woods, she stops to listen to his music, and notes it's sadness, before heading into the nearest town with Hank and Slidell. An incident in town prompts Laurel to tell her brother about Jubel, and Hank gets into a fight with him. His friend, Chauncey Feith, the town's army recruiter, breaks up the fight and the trio returns home.

Meanwhile, Walter Smith, a man who has just escaped some sort of camp, wanders to the cove and stays for three days to heal. On the fourth day he intends to leave, but he suddenly slips and falls and is attacked by a swarm of yellow jackets. He begins to hallucinate.

Laurel goes looking for the flute playing man, who we now find out is Walter. He is lying on the ground, obviously badly hurt, and she and Hank bring him back to their cabin. While nursing Walter back to health she discovers a paper in his knapsack identifying him as a mute. She discovers that he is trying to catch a train to New York City. In exchange for his help with chores around the cove, Walter is allowed to stay until their next trip with Slidell. At the end of Part One, Laurel sees Walter hide a medallion between some rocks and, retrieving it, she attempts, unsuccessfully, to discover its significance.

=== Part Two (Ch. 6–11) ===
Chauncey Feith goes to the Turkey Trot to drink with war veterans and send his well wishes to Boyce Clayton, the uncle of a hospitalized soldier, Paul Clayton. Chauncey recruited Paul and has a fondness for him. Chauncey is not well liked by any veterans in town, because he is only a recruiter and has never fought in any war. Chauncey takes two young boys to the Mars Hill library to look for books written in German that might be "aiding the enemy."

Meanwhile, Walter continues to work in the cove and Laurel wishes he would stay longer. Hank tries to convince him to stay. Laurel kisses Walter, but he walks away immediately thereafter. The next morning, Walter leaves with Slidell without saying goodbye. When he tries to buy a train ticket he realizes his face is on a wanted poster outside of the station. He tries to hop on the train without a ticket but fails, and walks back to the cove.

=== Part Three (Ch. 12–16) ===
Walter has been at the cove for two months. Laurel and Walter are a couple and Laurel is happy. Chaucey takes the petition he has started to have Professor at the college fired for "aiding the Huns" to a senator and daydreams about having a statue built in his honor for his efforts during the war. Laurel begins to suspect that Walter isn't a mute, and that he can read and write and has only been pretending. She seeks out the help of Miss Calicut to determine the meaning of the word on the medallion Walter had arrived with. Miss Calicut takes her to see Professor Mayer, who tells her its inscription, Vaterland, means "Fatherland" and was the name of a large German ocean liner that was stranded in the New York Harbor in 1914. For three years its occupants were free to do what they wanted but after the U.S. entered the war in 1917, its occupants were taken to an internment camp in Hot Springs, North Carolina. The Vaterland is now a troop ship known as the Leviathan. The group concludes that the medallion must have belonged to the German escapee and that he is probably long gone by now. Laurel, now hurt and confused by her findings, heads back to the cove and confronts Walter in private. She learns that it is true and that he can speak, read, and write. His real name is Jurgin Walter Koch and he wishes to stay with her after the war is over.

=== Part Four (Ch. 17–20) ===
Hank and Walter work together to dig a well. Laurel buys material to make a dress for when she and Walter can head for NYC when the war is over. Chauncey awaits a letter from governor and finally receives it only to hear that the governor will not attend Paul Clayton's coming home party. Hank and Walter continue to work on the well and Walter nearly has an accident. The incident gave all three a fright, but they're all alright.

=== Part Five (Ch. 21–25) ===
Laurel is happy and dreams of the day she and Walter can leave the cove together. Then November 9 arrives, and it's the day of Paul Clayton's coming home parade that Chauncey has so diligently planned. The Claytons see a wanted poster for Walter and recognize him. They tell Chauncey and they head to the cove armed with weapons. Laurel and Walter are returning home when they spot Chauncey, the Claytons, Jubel, and Hank tied up. Laurel tells Walter to wade up the creek and if she doesn't meet him that night to go on without her. Laurel is discovered by Chauncey and his mob and Chauncey accidentally shoots and kills her. Jubel and Chauncey are the only ones who show no remorse, as the rest are stunned and abandon the hunt for Walter. Fearing Hank will kill him, Chauncey kills Hank while Hank is tied up on the porch. Walter waits for Laurel for three days before finally deciding to return to the cove. He sees the bloodstains and finds two fresh graves. He walks into town to find people celebrating - the war has ended. Walter sees Slidell in the bar and Slidell explains what happened. Chauncey hasn't been seen since, he says. Slidell fends off Jubel and puts Walter on a train out of Mars Hill. Walter intends to go to New York to play his flute.

== Awards and nominations ==
The Cove was listed as #16 on the New York Times Bestseller list for Hardcover Fiction in the April 29, 2012 issue of The New York Times Book Review and remained on the list as #29, #22, and #31 for the three subsequent weeks. The novel also won the Southern Independent Booksellers Alliance Okra Pick for Summer 2012 and was listed in the Amazon.com Best Books of April 2012.

== Publication history ==
- Rash, Ron (April 10, 2012). The Cove (hardback ed.). Ecco Press, an imprint of HarperCollins. ISBN 9780061804199.
