= Philip Zandén =

Swedish actor

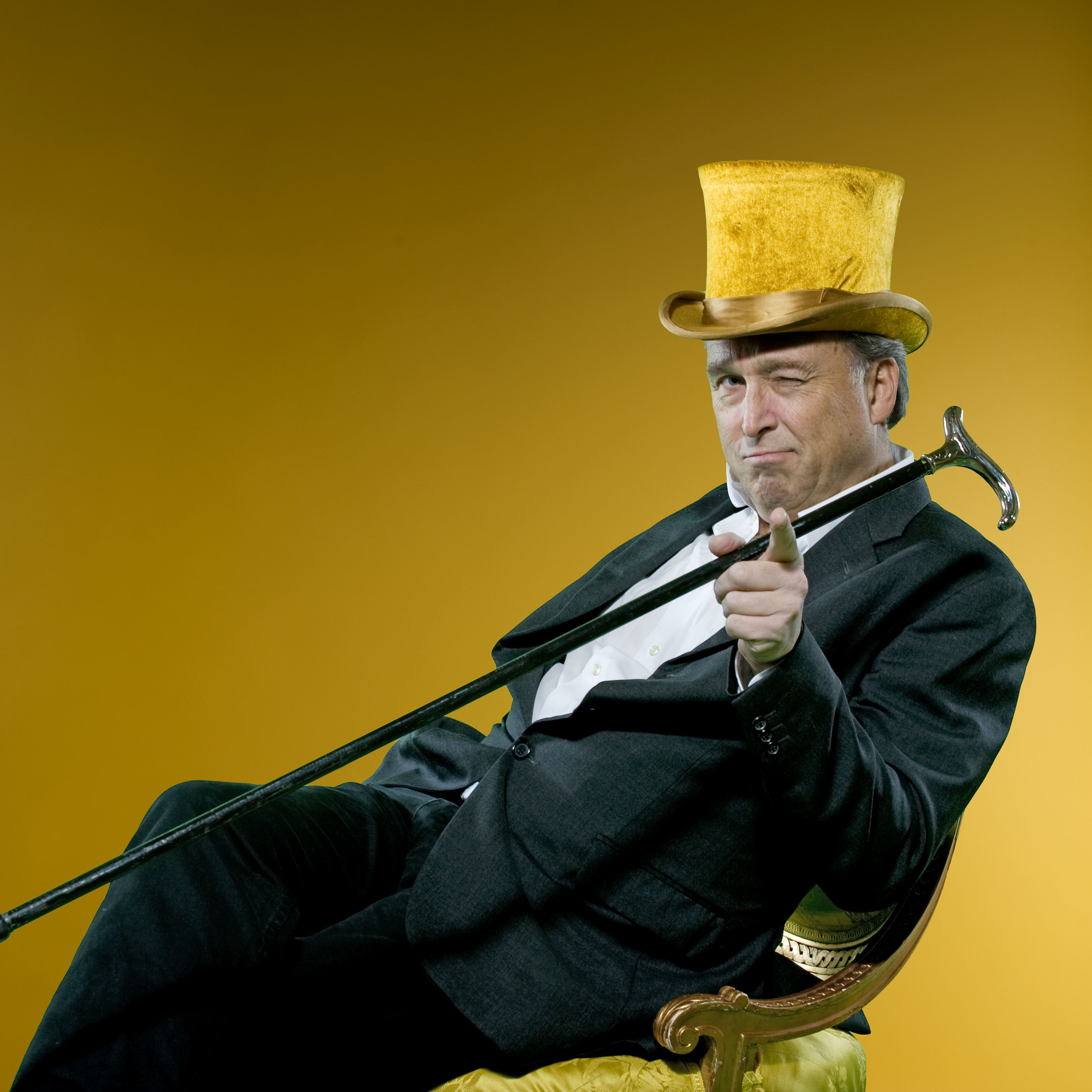
- Zandén in 2011.
- Born: 23 July 1954 (age 72); Stockholm, Sweden
- Occupation: Actor
- Years active: 1981—present
- Spouses: Philippa Wallér Susanne Bier; Maria Salomaa; (m. 2013)
- Relatives: Jessica Zandén (sister)

Philip Zandén (born 23 July 1954) is a Swedish actor. He has appeared in more than 60 films and television shows since 1981. He is the brother of actress Jessica Zandén. Through his marriage to the Danish filmmaker Susanne Bier, he is the father of the actress Alice Bier Zandén.

== Partial filmography ==
- Jönssonligan och Dynamit-Harry (1982) - Direktörsassistenten
- Mamma (1982) - Arne
- Ronia, the Robber's Daughter (1984) - Adelsherre
- False as Water (1985) - Jens
- Stilleben (1985) - The young man
- The Mozart Brothers (1986) - Flemming
- Amorosa (1986) - Adolf von Krusenstjerna
- Lethal Film (1988) - Lucho
- Jungfruresan (1988) - Lindqvist
- Nallar och människor (1989) - (voice)
- Codename Coq Rouge (1989) - Appeltoft
- Exit (1990) - Åke/the emaciated man/warthog (voice)
- The Guardian Angel (1990) - Jacob
- Riktiga män bär alltid slips (1991) - Felix
- The Boys from St. Petri (1991) - Jacob 'Rosen' Rosenheim
- Freud Leaving Home (1991) - David Cohen
- Brev til Jonas (1992)
- Dreaming of Rita (1993) - Steff
- Black Harvest (1993) - Isidor Seemann
- Det bli'r i familien (1993) - Jan
- Like It Never Was Before (1995) - Superintendent
- Jomfruene i Riga (1996)
- Sånt är livet (1996) - Stef Bäckman
- Credo (1997) - Inspektøren
- The Prompter (1999) - Tubaisten
- Faithless (2000) - Martin Goldman
- Amatørene (2001) - Iver
- Humørkortstativsælgerens søn (2002) - Staffan
- Open Hearts (2002) - Tommy
- Doxa (2005) - Ingemar
- Den utvalde (2005) - Kjell
- Min frus förste älskare (2006) - Robert
- Moreno and the Silence (2006) - Reinhart
- Suddenly (2006) - Simon
- Beck – Den japanska shungamålningen (2007, TV Series) - Malte Beverin
- Så olika (2009) - Joel Adler
- Retrace (2011) - Steve
- Love Is All You Need (2012) - Male Doctor
- Disciple (2013) - Lotskapten Hallström
- Serena (2014) - Calhoun
- Micke & Veronica (2014) - Tommy
- Under pyramiden (2016) - Arthur Ramsby
- Jag älskar dig - En skilsmässokomedi (2016) - Chefen
- Kungen av Atlantis (2019) - Magnus
- 438 dagar (2019) - Carl Bildt
