= The Caretaker (Rash novel) =

2023 novel by Ron Rash

- Author: Ron Rash
- Genre: Fiction
- Published: 2023

The Caretaker is a 2023 novel by Ron Rash.

== Plot summary ==
Jacob Hampton has been disowned by his wealthy parents as a consequence for eloping with Naomi, a hotel maid from out-of-town. After he is drafted into the Korean War, he asks his friend Blackburn Gant to take care of the pregnant Naomi. Blackburn was also abandoned by his family and works as a cemetery caretaker, having been disfigured by polio.

== Themes ==
The novel deals with themes of class differences, Southern honor, rebirth and the passage of time.

== Reception ==
The book received positive reviews from critics. Reviewers praised its depiction of mid-century North Carolina and its nuanced characters. Kirkus Reviews wrote that "Rash writes with finesse and affection, as usual, of western North Carolina and its people. But the mood isn't mere nostalgia—there's a flint and an unflinching realism underneath, especially in his portrayal of the stalwart, utterly solid Blackburn Gant". Publishers Weekly praised the book's "lyrically nuanced prose faithfully evokes the Appalachian landscape, and Rash again showcases an ability to dig beneath the surface of his characters to expose their base desires and intentions." The book was also praised by John Caleb Grenn in the Mississippi Clarion Ledger.
