= The World Made Straight =

Novel by Ron Rash

- Author: Ron Rash
- Language: English
- Genre: Southern Gothic, Bildungsroman
- Publisher: Henry Holt
- Publication date: April 2006
- Publication place: United States
- Media type: Print (hardcover)
- Pages: 289 (hardcover edition)
- ISBN: 0-8050-7866-5 (Hardcover edition)
- OCLC: 60824236
- Dewey Decimal: 813/.54 22
- LC Class: PS3568.A698 W67 2006

The World Made Straight is a 2006 novel by Ron Rash.

== Plot ==
In 1970s western North Carolina, a young man stumbles across a grove of marijuana, sees an opportunity to make some easy money, and steps into the jaws of a bear trap. He is discovered by the ruthless farmer who set the trap to protect his plants, and begins his struggle with the evils of his community's present as well as those of its history. Before long, he has moved out of his parents' home to live with a onetime schoolteacher who now lives in a trailer outside town, deals a few drugs, and studies journals from the American Civil War. Their fates become entwined as the community's terrible past and corrupt present lead to a violent reckoning with the marijuana farmer and with a Civil War massacre that continues to divide an Appalachian community.

== Characters ==
- Travis Shelton, 17 years old, high school dropout discouraged from bettering himself by his tobacco farmer father.
- Leonard Shuler, a former schoolteacher, now small-time drug dealer, whose career was ended by a vindictive student.
- Carlton Toomey, a ruthless and wily farmer and drug dealer.
- Dena, once a pretty young woman, who has become a heavy drug user.

== Release details ==
- 2006, USA, Henry Holt ISBN 0-8050-7866-5, Pub date April 2006, Hardcover

== Film adaptation ==
The novel was adapted into a feature film, with a screenplay by Shane Danielsen. Jeremy Irvine starred as Travis, and Noah Wyle played his mentor Leonard. Adelaide Clemens, Minka Kelly, Steve Earle, and Haley Joel Osment were also among the cast. Michael Wrenn and Todd J. Labarowski produced, and producer David Burris made his directorial debut. The film was shot in North Carolina and was released in January 2015. It received mixed reviews.
