= Wiley Cash =

American novelist

- Born: September 7, 1977 (age 48); Fayetteville, North Carolina, U.S.
- Education: University of Louisiana at Lafayette (PhD); University of North Carolina at Greensboro (MA); University of North Carolina at Asheville
- Occupation: Novelist
- Spouse: Mallory Cash (2010-present)
- Children: 2
- Relatives: Cliff Cash (brother)
- Writing career
- Notable awards: Southern Book Prize, CWA New Blood Dagger, Gold Dagger
- Website: wileycash.com

Wiley Cash (born September 7, 1977) is a New York Times best-selling novelist from North Carolina. He is the author of four novels, the first three of which are A Land More Kind Than Home, This Dark Road to Mercy, and The Last Ballad. His work has won numerous awards, including the Southern Book Prize three times, and the Crime Writers' Association's CWA New Blood Dagger and Gold Dagger.

== Personal life ==
Cash was born in Fayetteville, North Carolina, and grew up in Gastonia, North Carolina. His mother was a nurse, and his father was a pharmacist. He was raised Southern Baptist. His brother is the comedian Cliff Cash; they also have a sister. Cash attended Ashbrook High School and Gaston Day School in Gastonia.

After graduating from the University of North Carolina at Asheville, Cash earned an M.A. from UNC-Greensboro, then a Ph.D. in American Literature from University of Louisiana at Lafayette, where he was mentored by writer Ernest J. Gaines.

In 2016, he became writer-in-residence at UNC-Asheville, his alma mater. He previously taught at Southern New Hampshire University.

He lives in Wilmington, North Carolina, with his wife and two children.

== Career ==
Cash's writing has been praised for his ear for Southern dialect, Southern Gothic qualities, and blending of family drama with suspense. He often uses a multi-character perspective in his works, shifting chapters between a number of characters to tell the story. The Last Ballad uses eight.

Vanity Fair jokingly dubbed him "the Justin Timberlake of American literature" after Cash was mistaken for the singer at Timberlake's New York restaurant.

All of Cash's books are set in his home state of North Carolina. He told an interviewer for National Public Radio that North Carolina plays a central role in his writing: "Every time I put pen to paper, it's an act of trying to reclaim a place I love."

Cash's 2012 debut novel, A Land More Kind Than Home, a thriller with Southern Gothic elements which follows the destructive wake of a deceptive snake-handling faith healer, was positively reviewed by The Washington Post and other national publications. It was named one of the 100 most notable books of 2012 by The New York Times, which called it "mesmerizing".

His second novel, This Dark Road to Mercy, tells the story of two young girls who are thrown together with their estranged father, a washed-up baseball player. It is set during the 1998 home run battle between Mark McGwire and Sammy Sosa. Chicago Tribune reviewer Hope Reese praised Cash's "knack for flow and dialogue" but said that the story felt rushed and underexplored. Washington Post reviewer Ron Charles felt that This Dark Road to Mercy was overly predictable and flat in comparison to Cash's debut.

His 2017 novel The Last Ballad is a fictionalized version of the 1929 Loray Mill strike in Gastonia, centered on the murder of activist and musician Ella May Wiggins. He was drawn to the subject by the fact that its history had been seemingly forgotten despite its close proximity to his own family and hometown; his parents both grew up in nearby milling communities, and his mother's maiden name was Wiggin. He also took inspiration from music of the 1920s and 1930s thanks to his friendship with members of the string band Old Crow Medicine Show. New York Times reviewer, Amy Rowland, praised the novel's blend of fact and fiction, saying "Cash vividly blends the archival with the imaginative. .... Cash, with care and steadiness, has pulled from the wreckage of the past a lost moment of Southern progressivism."

Cash also contributed an essay to the 2009 book This Louisiana Thing that Drives Me: The Legacy of Ernest J. Gaines.

His fourth novel, When Ghosts Come Home, is a murder mystery set in the town of Oak Island, North Carolina. It was published by Morrow in 2021. Reviewing the book for the Atlanta Journal-Constitution, Phil Kloer called it a "gripping, multi-layered novel about the South and race and how the past keeps a grip on the present."

In 2025, he was named as a recipient of the North Carolina Award, the highest civilian award bestowed by the U.S. state of North Carolina.

== Books ==
- A Land More Kind Than Home (2012)
- This Dark Road to Mercy (2014)
- The Last Ballad (2017)
- When Ghosts Come Home (2021)

== Awards and nominations ==
- CWA New Blood Dagger, 2012, for A Land More Kind than Home
- PEN/Robert W. Bingham Prize shortlist, 2013, for A Land More Kind than Home
- Southern Book Prize, 2013
- Thomas Wolfe Memorial Literary Award, 2014 for A Land More Kind Than Home
- CWA Gold Dagger, 2014, for This Dark Road to Mercy
- Edgar Award (finalist), 2015, for This Dark Road to Mercy
- Southern Book Prize, 2018, for The Last Ballad
- American Library Association Book of the Year, 2018, for The Last Ballad
- Southern Book Prize, 2022, for When Ghosts Come Home
- North Carolina Award, 2025
