= Tony Earley =

American novelist and short story writer

- Born: 1961 (age 64–65); San Antonio, Texas
- Education: Warren Wilson College; University of Alabama
- Occupations: Novelist, short story writer
- Writing career
- Notable work: Jim the Boy (2000)

Tony Earley (born 1961) is an American novelist and short story writer. He was born in San Antonio, Texas, but grew up in North Carolina. His stories are often set in North Carolina.

Earley studied English at Warren Wilson College and after graduation in 1983, he spent four years as a reporter in North Carolina, first as a general assignment reporter for The Thermal Belt News Journal in Columbus, North Carolina, and then as sports editor and feature writer at The Daily Courier in Forest City, North Carolina. Later he attended the University of Alabama in Tuscaloosa, where he received an MFA in creative writing. He quickly found success writing short stories, first with smaller literary magazines, then with Harper's Magazine, which published two of his stories: "Charlotte" in 1992 and "The Prophet From Jupiter" in 1993. The latter story earned Harper's a National Magazine Award for Fiction in 1994.

In 1996, Earley's short stories earned him a place on Granta's list of the "Best of Young American Novelists", and shortly after that announcement, The New Yorker featured him in an issue that focused on the best new novelists in America. He has twice been included in the annual The Best American Short Stories anthology. His writing style has been compared by critics to writers as distant as a young Ernest Hemingway and E. B. White. One of his favorite writers is Willa Cather.

On May 15, 2010 Earley gave a humorous commencement speech at Warren Wilson College. He was inducted into the Fellowship of Southern Writers in 2010. He lives with his wife and two daughters in Nashville, Tennessee, where he is the Samuel Milton Fleming Professor of English at Vanderbilt University.

== Prizes ==
Year	Work	Award	Category	Result	Ref
	Here We Are in Paradise	International Dublin Literary Award	—	Longlisted	
1997	"The Paperhanger"	O Henry Award	—	Won	
2000	Jim the Boy	Booklist Editor's Choice	Adult Books for Young Adults	Select	
2001	Jim the Boy	Southern Book Prize	—	Won	
2002	Jim the Boy	Alabama Author Award	Juvenile	Won	

== Bibliography ==
=== Jim the Boy series of novels ===
- Jim the Boy (2000, Little Brown)
- The Blue Star (2008, Little Brown)

=== Collections ===
- Here We Are in Paradise (1994)
- Mr. Tall (2014)

=== Essays and reporting ===
- Somehow form a Family: Stories That Are Mostly True (2001)
- Earley, Tony (December 3, 2012). "Nighthawk". Gut Course. The New Yorker. Vol. 88, no. 38. pp. 82–83.

=== Short stories ===
- "Backpack" in The New Yorker (2018)
- "The Prophet from Jupiter" in Harper's
- "Place of Safety" in Harper's

=== Speeches and interviews ===
- Commencement at Warren Wilson College: A great class hears a great address (2010)
- Audio Interview with Bill Goldstein for The New York Times (2000)
- Interview with Deborah Treisman for The New Yorker (2018)

== Extern ==
- Tony Earley at LibraryThing
