= Credo (1997 film) =

1997 Danish thriller film

- Directed by: Susanne Bier
- Written by: Peter Asmussen; Susanne Bier; Jakob Grønlykke
- Based on: Dyr by Juliane Preisler
- Produced by: Peter Aalbæk Jensen; Ib Tardini
- Starring: Sofie Gråbøl; Ellen Hillingsø
- Cinematography: Göran Nilsson
- Edited by: Per K. Kirkegaard; Jacob Thuesen
- Music by: Hilmar Örn Hilmarsson
- Production company: Zentropa
- Distributed by: Metronome
- Release date: 12 September 1997 (Denmark)
- Running time: 87 min
- Country: Denmark
- Languages: Danish, Swedish, Norwegian

Credo is a 1997 Danish thriller film. Its original Danish title is Sekten, which means "The Sect". Written and directed by Susanne Bier, the film stars Sofie Gråbøl and Ellen Hillingsø, and was produced by Zentropa.

== Cast ==
- Sofie Gråbøl ... Mona
- Ellen Hillingsø ... Anne
- Sverre Anker Ousdal ... Dr. Lack
- Stina Ekblad ... Karen
- Ghita Nørby ... Mother-in-law
- Christina Ankerskjold ... Freja
- Camilla Søeberg ... Bolette
- Ulrich Thomsen ... Svane
- Jesper Langberg ... Dr. Frederiksen
- Jesper Christensen ... Brother 1
- Torben Jensen ... Brother 2
- Marianne Mörck ... Fortune Teller
- Solbjørg Højfeldt ... Psychologist
- Philip Zandén ... Inspector
- Ilse Rande ... Wedding Planner
