= Cliff Cash =

American stand-up comedian (born 1980)

- Born: Clifton Freeman Cash; 1980 (age 45–46); Gastonia, North Carolina, U.S.
- Education: University of North Carolina at Asheville
- Occupation: stand-up comedian
- Years active: 2011-present
- Relatives: Wiley Cash (brother)
- Website: comediancliffcash.com

Clifton Freeman Cash (born 1980) is an American stand-up comedian who was born in Gastonia, North Carolina and now resides in Wilmington, North Carolina.

His album Half Way There, released on January 8, 2021, on Stand Up! Records, reached No. 1 on the iTunes comedy chart.

== Personal life ==
Cash was born in Gastonia, North Carolina and raised in a conservative Southern Baptist home. He is the younger brother of novelist Wiley Cash. The two have often appeared on stage together. They also have a sister.

He attended the University of North Carolina at Asheville.

He lives in Wilmington, North Carolina. He was divorced in 2017.

He has made a goal of visiting and documenting all 61 U.S. national parks while on tour as a comic.

== Career ==
Cash's first open mic was in 2011. Before becoming a full-time comedian, Cash worked in sales and real-estate investing for six years, then started a recycling company, Green Coast Recycling. Cash won a Pelican award from the North Carolina Coastal Federation in 2013 for organizing the environmental group Friends of the Lower Cape Fear.

His comedy, inspired by George Carlin, is often satiric and politically pointed, tackling topics such as racism, religious fundamentalism, and the MeToo movement. It often reflects his progressive political outlook, contrasting it with his conservative upbringing and Southern cultural stereotypes. He often uses shows as fundraisers for environmental and other causes. Bill Poteat of the Gaston Gazette noted that Cash's skewering of southern conservatism can be sarcastic, "yet the humor is at its foundation gentle rather than confrontational".

With two other Southern comics, Tom Simmons and Stewart Huff, Cash launched the Sick of Stupid Tour, which he described as "the unofficial rebuttal" to the more stereotypically Southern Blue Collar Comedy Tour and a different perspective on topics like gay rights, religion and gun control to shows like Duck Dynasty.

He has performed across the U.S. since 2016, including the Houston Whatever Fest, Cape Fear Comedy Festival, Norfolk Comedy Festival, Altercation Comedy Festival, San Luis Obispo Comedy Festival, and the Boise, Idaho Treefort Music Fest. He won the Port City’s Top Comic contest in 2013, was a semifinalist and regional winner in Comedy Central's Up Next competition, and a semifinalist on Standup NBC.

He appeared on two episodes of the Fox series Laughs in 2014.

=== Albums ===
Half Way There was distilled from four hours of material recorded at Dead Crow Comedy Room in Wilmington in 2016. It begins with Cash in character as a stereotypical "redneck", satirizing conservative attitudes, before segueing into his own voice, which is more observational and left-leaning. Richard Lanoie of The Serious Comedy Site reviewed the album positively, writing "I enjoyed it a lot. I just wish there was more, lots more."

== Discography ==
- Cliff Cash, Half Way There (Stand Up! Records, 2021)
