= My Sunshine Away =

2015 novel by M. O. Walsh

- Author: M.O. Walsh
- Language: English
- Genre: Coming-of-age, mystery
- Published: February 10, 2015
- Publisher: Amy Einhorn Books
- Publication place: United States
- Media type: Hardcover
- Pages: 306
- Awards: Housatonic Book Award for Fiction
- ISBN: 978-0399169526
- OCLC: 876466298
- Dewey Decimal: 813.6

My Sunshine Away is a 2015 coming-of-age mystery novel by M.O. Walsh about a free-spirirted young girl, Lindy Simpson, who experienced a crime at her home in the southern suburbia of Baton Rouge. It was published on February 10, 2015 by Amy Einhorn Books. It won the Southern Book Prize award and Housatonic Book Award for Fiction in 2016.

== Premise ==
In the town of Baton Rouge, Louisiana, 15 year old free-spirited and track star Lindy Simpson discovers a horrible crime one late evening near her home on the Summer of 1989 before becoming as a idyllic stretch of the Southern suburbia having a dark side.

== Reception ==
Alfred Hickling of The Guardian offers an intense assessment on My Sunshine Away, highlighting Walsh's debut as his book being a homage and apology to the mediocrity of his hometown while being an exercise in southern gothic that shows the justifying actions of Walsh's teenage self as the narrator of the book, showing the tone as supplicatory and insistent, yet becomes deeply unsettling by the sense of intimacy that amplifies the themes of lost innocence, the end of childhood, and the painful discovery of the world is not as simple as people being friendly. Publishers Weekly gave a good review about the book as often charming, and thoroughly immersive. Kirkus Reviews states the book looking back on the floods, fires, mosquitoes, heat waves and psychopaths of Walsh's childhood. Booklist and BookPage awarded it starred reviews while both The Book Reporter and The Arts Desk also raved about the novel.
