= Celia Rivenbark =

American humor columnist and author

Celia Rivenbark is an American humor columnist and award-winning, bestselling author.

== Background ==
Rivenbark was born and raised in Duplin County, North Carolina. She is married to Scott Whisnant, the Director of Government Relations for New Hanover Health Network.

Rivenbark resides in Wilmington, North Carolina with her husband and daughter, Sophie.

== Journalism career ==
Rivenbark graduated from college and started working for The Wallace Enterprise in Wallace, North Carolina. She later moved to the Morning Star in Wilmington, where she wrote a humor column. Her column won her a national health journalism award in addition to some press awards.

Rivenbark also authored weekly humor columns for The Sun News of Myrtle Beach, South Carolina. A collection of her columns was published in 2000 by Coastal Carolina Press.

== Literary career ==
Three of Rivenbark's books were nominated for the James Thurber Prize:

- Bless Your Heart, Tramp in 2001,
- We're Just Like You, Only Prettier (finalist) in 2004,
- Belle Weather: Mostly Sunny with a Chance of Scattered Hissy Fits (semi-finalist) in 2006.

In 2004, Rivenbark's book We're Just Like You, Only Prettier won the Southern Book Prize Nonfiction Book of the Year title. Belle Weather: Mostly Sunny with a Chance of Scattered Hissy Fits (2006), and You Can't Drink All Day If You Don't Start in the Morning (2010) were later prize finalists.

Entertainment Weekly Magazine designated Rivenbark's book Stop Dressing Your Six-Year-Old Like a Skank as 2006's best title. Her book You Don't Sweat Much for a Fat Girl was a New York Times bestseller.

== Works ==
- Bless Your Heart, Tramp, 2000
- We're Just Like You, Only Prettier, 2004
- Stop Dressing Your Six-Year-Old Like a Skank, 2006
- Belle Weather: Mostly Sunny with a Chance of Scattered Hissy Fits, 2008
- You Can't Drink All Day If You Don't Start in the Morning, 2009
- You Don't Sweat Much for a Fat Girl: Observations on Life from the Shallow End of the Pool, 2011
- Rude Bitches Make Me Tired, 2013
