= Serena (2014 film) =

American-French drama film

- Theatrical release poster
- Directed by: Susanne Bier
- Written by: Christopher Kyle
- Based on: Serena by Ron Rash
- Produced by: Nick Wechsler; Susanne Bier; Steve Schwartz; Paula Mae Schwartz; Todd Wagner; Ron Halpern; Ben Cosgrove
- Starring: Bradley Cooper; Jennifer Lawrence; Rhys Ifans; Toby Jones; David Dencik; Sean Harris; Ana Ularu
- Cinematography: Morten Søborg
- Edited by: Pernille Bech Christensen; Matthew Newman; Simon Webb
- Music by: Johan Söderqvist
- Production companies: 2929 Entertainment; Chockstone Pictures; Nick Wechsler Productions
- Distributed by: Magnolia Pictures (United States); StudioCanal (United Kingdom and France)
- Release dates: October 13, 2014 (BFI London Film Festival); October 24, 2014 (United Kingdom); November 12, 2014 (France); March 27, 2015 (United States)
- Running time: 110 minutes
- Countries: United States; France
- Language: English
- Budget: $25–30 million
- Box office: $5 million

Serena is a 2014 drama film based on the 2008 novel of the same name by American author Ron Rash. Directed by Susanne Bier, the film stars Jennifer Lawrence and Bradley Cooper as newlyweds running a timber business in 1930s North Carolina. It received negative reviews and was a box office failure, grossing $5 million worldwide against a $25–30 million production budget.

== Plot ==
In Depression-era North Carolina, George Pemberton is an ambitious timber baron. On a visit to Boston, he falls in love with Serena Shaw, a young woman with a sad past. They marry, and she joins him at the timber camp and starts to take control, pressuring and questioning George while remaining affectionate.

George's business partner Buchanan feels threatened as Serena begins to undermine his authority. The partnership worsens, and Buchanan strikes a deal with the local sheriff, who wants to buy George's land to make a national park. George is hurt by his betrayal, and Serena convinces him Buchanan was never his friend.

On a shooting trip, George and Buchanan go alone to flush out a bear. George contemplates killing him, only to hesitate and be seen by him. Buchanan cocks his rifle, but George fires first and kills him. Campbell, George's worker, witnesses the murder but denies it to Sheriff McDowell, and the death is ruled an accident. Serena consoles George and justifies his actions.

After seeing his illegitimate son Jacob posing with his mother, Rachel, for a picture, George feels responsible for the boy and begins giving her money. Serena remains unaware of this, but considers Rachel and the baby a threat.

When camp worker Galloway loses his hand to an errant axe swing, Serena uses a belt as a tourniquet to save his life, earning his devotion. Later, George rushes the pregnant Serena to the hospital after she experiences heavy bleeding and pain. She miscarries, and they learn she can never again bear children. Tensions grow, and the parentage of Rachel's baby becomes more obvious to Serena.

While Serena and George are away, Campbell takes ledgers from the safe and presents them to the Sheriff. He is preparing to testify that George has been bribing a senator and shot Buchanan deliberately. Discovering what Campbell has done, George and Serena realize he could ruin them.

Galloway tells Serena that he knows where Campbell is, and tells George there is a panther in the forest so he's busy hunting it. Meanwhile, Galloway heads into town to kill Campbell and retrieve the ledgers. Finding George’s hidden picture of Rachel and her baby and discovering that George has been giving Rachel money, Serena scratches the baby's face from the photograph.

Serena leaves with Galloway, telling George that she has business to take care of. Not finding Rachel at home, they head for the Widow Jenkins’. George's employee Vaughn calls the Sheriff, worried about Rachel and what Serena plans to do. The Sheriff goes to Widow Jenkins', finding her with her throat slashed, and takes Rachel and her baby away.

In the morning, the Sheriff questions George, revealing that Galloway killed Campbell and the Widow Jenkins and that he is after Rachel and her child. George asks Serena if she sent him to kill Rachel and Jacob, which she insists was necessary. He storms out; when Serena follows him, he briefly chokes her before driving off with a gun and the ledgers.

George goes to the Sheriff, gives him the ledgers, and promises to turn himself in if he tells him where Rachel and the baby are. George races to save her before Galloway finds her. Galloway tracks Rachel to the train station, where she hides in a shed. As the train approaches, George finds Galloway, who sees Rachel jump onto the train. George goes after them and slashes Galloway's throat.

George bids Rachel and the baby farewell as they depart to live with Vaughn. George returns to the camp and sets off to hunt the panther. He shoots it, but it leaps at him from behind, fatally wounding him. He manages to kill it with a hunting knife before dying.

The Sheriff returns to the Pemberton cabin with George's body. Serena, having expected him to return, grows upset and refuses to identify his body. As the Sheriff leaves, she lies on the bed and uses a lighter to set the cabin on fire. Serena remains motionless as it burns, killing her.

== Cast ==
- Bradley Cooper as George Pemberton
- Jennifer Lawrence as Serena Pemberton (née Shaw)
- Rhys Ifans as Galloway
- Sean Harris as Campbell
- Toby Jones as Sheriff McDowell
- Sam Reid as Joe Vaughn
- David Dencik as Mr. Buchanan
- Conleth Hill as Dr. Chaney
- Blake Ritson as Lowenstein
- Ned Dennehy as Ledbetter
- Charity Wakefield as Agatha
- Michael Ryan as Coldfield
- Kim Bodnia as Abe Hermann
- Ana Ularu as Rachel Hermann
- Bodil Jørgensen as Mrs. Sloan
- Douglas Hodge as Horace Kephart

== Production ==
The film was originally to be directed by Darren Aronofsky, with Angelina Jolie as the title character. Susanne Bier replaced Aronofsky as director and brought on Jennifer Lawrence instead. Lawrence recommended Bradley Cooper, with whom she had worked previously on Silver Linings Playbook; they had gotten along so well that they often spoke about working together in the future. When Lawrence read the script for Serena, she sent a copy to Cooper and asked if he would do it with her. He agreed and Bier cast him as George Pemberton.

At the time, this was the third project to star Cooper and Lawrence, after Silver Linings Playbook and American Hustle, and their second time playing mutual love interests.

Filming took place in the Czech Republic at Barrandov Studios from March 26 to May 2012. Bier took more than eighteen months to complete the film, but there were no re-shoots or problems in post-production. Bier also had to take time away to promote Love Is All You Need.

== Release ==
The film premiered at the BFI London Film Festival on October 13, 2014, was released in the United Kingdom on October 24, 2014, and France on November 12, 2014. Magnolia Pictures distributed the film in the United States. The film was released on all video on demand and digital stores on February 26, 2015, before a limited theatrical run on March 27, 2015.

== Reception ==
=== Box office ===
Serena earned £95,000 ($153,310) on its opening weekend in the United Kingdom, debuting at No. 19 at the UK box office. In its second week, the film dropped to finish 34th, grossing £11,645 from 37 screens. The movie ended its run with a total gross of $320,907 (£200,557).

It made $1 million on video on demand in the United States before its theatrical release, and opened in 59 screens across the United States on March 20, 2015, and earned $100,090 for a 30th-place finish.

As of November 9, 2014, Serena had a theatrical domestic gross of $100,090 and an international theatrical gross of $3,723,317 for a worldwide total of $3,823,407.

=== Critical response ===
Serena received negative reviews from critics. On Rotten Tomatoes, the film has a score of 17% based on 112 reviews with an average rating of 4.28/10. The website's critical consensus states "Serena unites an impressive array of talent on either side of the cameras – then leaves viewers to wonder how it all went so wrong." On Metacritic the film has a score of 36 out of 100 based on reviews from 29 critics, indicating "generally unfavorable reviews".

Andy Lea of Daily Star wrote in a positive review that, "It's another terrific performance from Lawrence, who almost manages to sell Serena's all too quick transformation from steely feminist to crazed femme fatale." Similarly, Peter Bradshaw of The Guardian praised Lawrence, "Lawrence brings her A-game. She is passionate, impetuous and confident, with a tough determination to grab the brass ring that has been presented to her." Guy Lodge of Variety agreed, "The Stanwyck comparisons lavished upon Lawrence's Oscar-winning work in Silver Linings Playbook resurface here; she certainly looks every inch the Golden Age siren with her crimped vanilla locks and array of creamy silken sheaths that, true to vintage Hollywood form, never seem to get sullied in the wild." He added, "The star also makes good on her proven chemistry with Cooper, who acquits himself with stoic intelligence and a variable regional accent in an inscrutable role that, for its occasional flourishes of Clark Gable bravado, is equal parts hero, anti-hero and patsy."

In The Canberra Times, Jake Wilson praised Cooper, arguing, "Cooper once again proves his value as a leading man who approaches his roles like a character actor." However, he was more nuanced about the cinematography, suggesting it made "the setting slightly abstract, in the manner of her former mentor Lars von Trier – and the storytelling suffers from some sudden transitions and ill-explained twists." He concluded, "if this is not a perfect film, it's an unusually haunting one."

Writing for the Toronto Star, Peter Howell criticized the film, suggesting the cinematography was "bland, unsteady and lacking in definition." In the Vancouver Sun, Katherine Monk argued that Bier was "probably trying to make a movie similar in feel to The Piano." However, she argued that the "whole national park subplot is confusing and blurs the blacks and whites required to generate sympathy, and every character suffers a similarly grey fate." She concluded, "by the end, we barely like anyone in this smoky landscape, let alone care about what happens to them." Writing for The Toronto Sun, Bruce Kirland stressed the setting of the Great Depression, suggesting it was, "the rural reflection of the film versions of The Great Gatsby, which are based on the classic 1925 novel by F. Scott Fitzgerald." Nevertheless, he called the film a "colossal bore."

In The Daily Telegraph, Robbie Collin praised Lawrence's acting at the expense of Cooper's, suggesting, "Lawrence comes out of it significantly better than Cooper," adding that she was "effectively Lady Macbeth in jodhpurs and a pussy-bow blouse." He concluded on a despondent note, writing "all [the film] amounts to is dead wood." Stephen Dalton of The Hollywood Reporter criticised the film, arguing, "it is difficult to believe a single word of it, still less to care about these relentlessly selfish and short-sighted characters." Dalton praised Lawrence's and Cooper's acting, but suggested the problem lay in "Christopher Kyle's script, a string of jarring cliches and clunky attempts at subtext" and "Johan Soderqvist's cloying, imploring orchestral score."

In The Irish Times, Donald Clark praised the cinematography as "exquisite," but suggested that Lawrence's performance was "genuinely poor." He concluded, "Nobody is likely to see the [film]." Writing for The Independent, Geoffrey Macnab called it "a strangely dour and downbeat affair." He suggested it was reminiscent of Michael Cimino's Heaven's Gate. However, he criticized its "heavy-handed poetic symbolism" and "the guilt and self-loathing that its characters feel."
