= Fire & Flavor =

American cooking products company

Fire & Flavor Grilling Co.
- Industry: All Natural Cooking & Grilling Products
- Founded: 2003
- Headquarters: Athens, Georgia, United States
- Area served: North America
- Key people: Davis Knox: President; Gena Knox: CEO
- Number of employees: 20+
- Website: Official website

Fire & Flavor is a privately held cooking products company located in Athens, Georgia. It specializes in all-natural cooking products and was founded by husband-and-wife team Davis and Gena Knox in 2003. Fire & Flavor is known for helping to popularize the plank grilling technique and for producing all natural cooking products such as grilling charcoal, brines, dry rubs and seasonings.

Fire & Flavor has been listed as one of Inc. Magazine’s top 100 fastest growing private companies. It has retail distribution in all 50 US states and Canada. As of 2007, the company had distribution in the United States and abroad at more than 8,000 retail stores and 4,000 restaurants.

In 2012, Fire & Flavor partnered with John Wayne Enterprises to develop a line of BBQ items under the John Wayne Stock & Supply brand.

In 2020, Fire & Flavor announced that it has established a strategic relationship with Green Bay, Wisconsin-based logistics and marketing company, Englewood Marketing Group (EMG).
