= When Ghosts Come Home =

2021 novel by Wiley Cash

- Author: Wiley Cash
- Genre: Crime fiction
- Published: 2021

When Ghosts Come Home is a 2021 novel by Wiley Cash.

== Plot summary ==
In 1984, Sheriff Winston Burnes must control escalating fear and racial tensions in Oak Island, North Carolina after a mysterious plane crash and shooting of a man.

== Background ==
While writing the novel, Cash researched the history of Brunswick County, North Carolina and interviewed a district attorney on how cases were prosecuted.

== Reception ==
The book received mostly positive reviews from critics. Reviewers praised the novel's characters and portrayal of 1980s North Carolina. In the Minnesota Star Tribune, Pamela Miller called it "a pretty darned good murder mystery that attempts, with some success, to examine the history of race relations in his beloved state during a certain era." A review from The New York Times praised the setting and storytelling but criticized its handling of racial themes, writing that "this suspenseful Reagan-era story of a Southern sheriff haunted by a violent act in his past seems most believable as the invention of a well-intentioned author writing in 2021."
