= Sarah Jane Foster =

American educator (1839–1868)

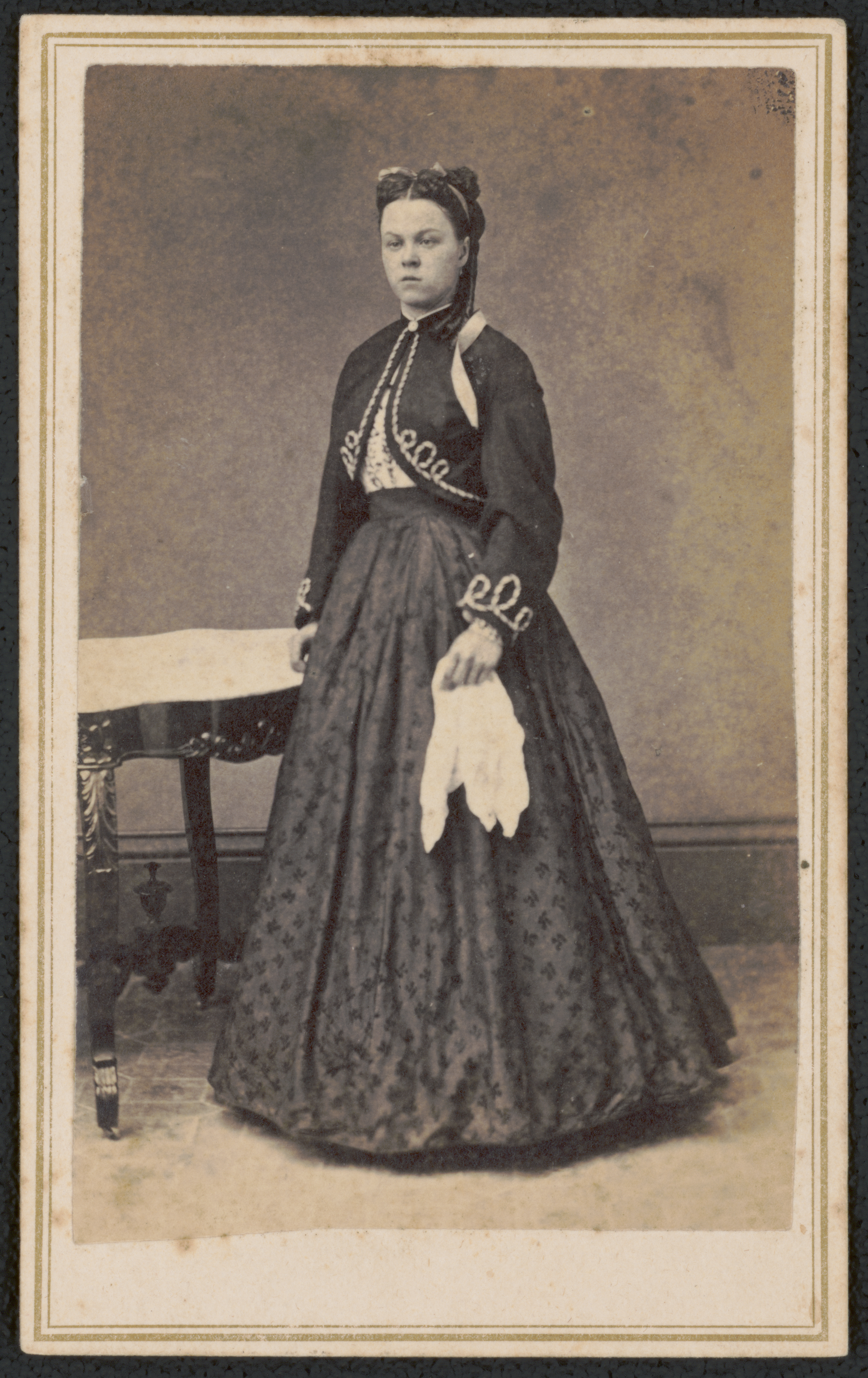
- Born: October 12, 1839
- Died: June 25, 1868 (aged 28)

Sarah Jane Foster (October 12, 1839 – June 25, 1868) was an educator of newly-freed blacks in Martinsburg, West Virginia, one of many northern volunteers who travelled south to aid and teach freedmen following the American Civil War.

== Early life ==
Sarah Jane Foster was born on October 12, 1839, the second of children of Moses B. Foster and Eliza A. Benson Foster. She grew up in Gray, Maine. Her exact level of education is unknown. Though she was too poor to have attended much in the way of formal schooling (she longed to have enough money to purchase her own books), she was well read and had well-educated siblings, including a doctor, a nurse and author, and a clergyman. Her family attended a Free Will Baptist church.

Initially Foster worked as a domestic servant and cared for the sick and dying, then as a teacher. She began writing for Home Monthly, a woman's magazine, and Zion's Advocate, a Baptist newspaper published in Portland, Maine. She also wrote short stories and sentimental poetry.

Foster was hired by Reverend Silas Curtis of the Free Will Baptist Home Missionary Society to teach in Martinsburg and she arrived in November 1865, documenting her work in dispatches for the Zion's Advocate. She taught in an "uncommonly bad" basement classroom, lacking a blackboard and sufficient textbooks, teaching about 80 students each day and 45 each night. Previous attempts at schooling had been met with harassment and violence, so she was publicly accompanied by male students to protect her, including her assistant John Brown (the namesake of the abolitionist hero). This led to a different kind of harassment, alleging Foster was engaged in sexual relationships with Brown and her students, or part-black herself. The harassment was so intense that an armed Freedmen's Bureau agent had to escort her home one evening. Foster was only in Martinsburg for four months; in April 1866 she was transferred to Harpers Ferry and in July, while on summer leave in Maine, she was dismissed.

Undeterred, Foster applied to the American Missionary Society and was hired to work with Francis L. Cardozo in Charleston, South Carolina, but she was soon sent to rural Charleston Neck, where she taught on an isolated farm away from the possible outrages of local whites. There she contracted yellow fever and died back in Maine on June 25, 1868.

== Legacy ==
Her great-great-nephew Wayne E. Reilly published selections of her diary entries, letters, and other writings as Sarah Jane Foster, teacher of the freedmen : a diary and letters and diary entries of Foster and her sister as The Diaries of Sarah Jane and Emma Ann Foster: A Year in Maine During the Civil War.
