= Jim the Boy =

2000 coming-of-age novel by Tony Earley

- First edition cover
- Author: Tony Earley
- Cover artist: Michael Ian Kaye (jacket design); Ross MacDonald (jacket art)
- Language: English
- Genre: Novel
- Set in: Fictional town in North Carolina
- Publisher: Little, Brown and Co.
- Publication date: June 2000
- Publication place: United States
- Media type: Print (hardback & paperback)
- Pages: 240 pp (first edition, hardback)
- ISBN: 0-316-19964-8 (first edition, hardback)
- OCLC: 42021547
- Dewey Decimal: 813/.54 21
- LC Class: PS3555.A685 J55 2000

Jim the Boy is a coming-of-age novel by Tony Earley, published by Little, Brown in 2000. It details the early life of Jim Glass, who lives with his mother, Elizabeth, and three uncles Coran, Zeno and Al, in the small fictional town of Aliceville, North Carolina.

== Allusions from other works ==
- Nashville Musician Paul Burch, Earley's neighbor at the time, was asked to write an album based on the story lines and characters in the book. The album, Last of My Kind, was released by Merge Records in 2001.
- In one scene Jan Karon's book In This Mountain, the local bookseller is seen reading Jim the Boy
