= Jessica Zandén =

Swedish actress (born 1957)

- Born: Anna Jessica Zandén; 28 March 1957 (age 69); Stockholm, Sweden
- Occupation: Actress
- Years active: 1983–present
- Relatives: Philip Zandén

Anna Jessica Zandén (born 28 March 1957) is a Swedish actress. She has appeared in more than 50 films and television shows since 1983. She is the sister of actor Philip Zandén and the aunt of Alice Bier Zandén.

She was born on 28 March 1957. She attended the Stockholm Theater Academy from 1978–1981. Her breakthrough role was in the TV series Tre kärlekar (1989–1991).

== Selected filmography ==
- Tre kärlekar (1989–1991)
- Freud Leaving Home (1991)
- The Ferris Wheel (1993)
- In Bed with Santa (1999)
- Once in a Lifetime (2000)
- Beck – Levande begravd (2009)
- Vår tid är nu (2017–2021)
