= Freud Leaving Home =

- Directed by: Susanne Bier
- Written by: Marianne Goldman
- Produced by: Peter Kropenin
- Starring: Ghita Nørby; Gunilla Röör
- Cinematography: Erik Zappon
- Edited by: Pernille Bech Christensen
- Music by: Johan Söderqvist
- Distributed by: Les Acacias Cinéaudience
- Release date: 18 October 1991
- Running time: 103 minutes
- Countries: Sweden; Denmark
- Language: Swedish

Freud Leaving Home (Swedish: Freud flyttar hemifrån...) is a 1991 Swedish comedy film directed by Susanne Bier. The film stars Ghita Nørby, Gunilla Röör, Palle Granditsky, Philip Zandén and Jessica Zandén.

The film follows a girl, Freud, from a Jewish family in Sweden. It was the first feature film in Sweden to depict Swedish-Jewish culture. The film won ten awards and was nominated for three others.

== Plot ==
The story revolves around three children, now adults, who gather at their family home in Stockholm, Sweden to celebrate their mother's 60th birthday. The daughter Angelique Cohen still lives at home, and her nickname is Freud, because she has an awful habit of psychoanalyzing everything and everyone, including members of the family.

Her brother David Cohen is gay and lives in Miami, Florida, with his partner Mike. His family hasn't really come to terms with him being gay yet. In one memorable moment, his father tells him to stop dancing around at Disney World like a "ridiculous fag’", to which David replies: "But I am a ridiculous fag". The daughter Deborah Cohen has become an Orthodox Jew and emigrated to Israel. The parents are Rosha, a Holocaust survivor, and Ruben, who is an antiques dealer.

Long-buried conflicts emerge when the kids find out that their party-loving mother, Rosha, who dominates the family, is to die of cancer within a few weeks. Rosha reveals to the family that she had wanted to marry her husband's brother, but she says that did not stop her from being a devoted spouse and generous mother. The birthday party gets postponed rather than cancelled, because Rosha refuses to die in the hospital and insists on dying as she had lived — after the party was over.

Ultimately, before she succumbs to her terminal cancer, she helps her husband and children confront the realities they are running from by encouraging them to make decisions rather than live passively. She advises Deborah, the overly-religious daughter, to get the abortion she wants. She tells her son that she will always love him despite his lifestyle; and she is pleased by Freud's desire to now move out of the house, after she lunges into a love affair with a free-spirited, unconventional Swede.

== Cast ==
- Ghita Nørby as Rosha Cohen
- Gunilla Röör as Freud
- Palle Granditsky as Ruben Cohen
- Philip Zandén as David Cohen
- Jessica Zandén as Deborah Cohen
- Peter Andersson as Adrian
- Stina Ekblad as Nurse
- Nils Eklund as Herman
- Basia Frydman as Vera
- Pierre Fränckel as Max
- Peter Stormare as Berra
- Johan Rabaeus as Dr. Lundgren
- Torgny Anderberg as Chicken Customer
- Lottie Ejebrant as Party Woman

== Reception ==
Film critic Kevin Thomas wrote Freud Leaving Home is "compassionate, emotion-charged and deeply perceptive ... its key setting is the comfortable Stockholm apartment of the Cohens, who are about to celebrate the 60th birthday of the vivacious Rosha Cohen; still living at home is her neurotic daughter, a perennial psych student nicknamed Freud. The hopefully joyous occasion takes a thoroughly unexpected tack that forces Freud at last to confront her need for independence. The result is a film at once sad, funny and courageous."

The Philadelphia Inquirer said the film "is a work of remarkable psychological insight that pivots on a painful truth for many Holocaust survivors: The memories of their suffering do not die with them, but live on to burden their children. It musters a delicate, often risky blend of humor and melancholy to explore how Rosha's experience has changed the dynamics of her family. Bier has the good judgment to avoid suggesting that everything can be healed or forgiven. Rosha's dealings with her husband and his brother are predictable in their development, but the tangled and often barbed feelings of her three children give Freud Leaving Home a fresh and original voice."

The Video Librarian opined that "despite some of the fascinating conflicts involved, Freud Leaving Home often seems shrill and erratic, caught up too much in the family's arguing and then dramatically changing tone to reveal the characters' love for one another."

== Awards ==
=== Won ===
- 1992 Angers European First Film Festival:
  - Audience Award - (Susanne Bier)
  - C.I.C.A.E. Award - (Susanne Bier)
- 1992 Bodil Awards:
  - Best Actress - (Ghita Nørby)
- 1992 Créteil International Women's Film Festival:
  - Grand Prix Award - (Susanne Bier)
- 1992 European Film Awards:
  - Best Supporting Actress - (Ghita Nørby)
- 1992 Guldbagge Awards:
  - Best Actress - (Gunilla Röör)
- 1991 Montréal World Film Festival:
  - Special Mention - (Susanne Bier)
- 1992 Robert Festival:
  - Best Actress - (Ghita Nørby)
  - Best Screenplay - (Marianne Goldman)
  - Best Supporting Actress - (Jessica Zandén)

=== Nominated ===
- 1992 Guldbagge Awards:
  - Best Actress - (Ghita Nørby)
  - Best Director - (Susanne Bier)
  - Best Screenplay - (Marianne Goldman)

== See also ==
- Cinema of Sweden
- List of Swedish films of the 1990s
- List of LGBTQ-related films of 1991
