= Saints at the River =

2004 novel by Ron Rash

- Author: Ron Rash
- Cover artist: Debra McClinton/Getty Images
- Language: English
- Genre: Fiction
- Published: 2004 Henry Holt
- Publication place: United States
- Media type: Print Hardback
- Pages: 239
- ISBN: 0-8050-7487-2

Saints at the River is a 2004 novel by American author Ron Rash. It is Rash's second published novel. It is the winner of the Weatherford Award for Best Novel and has been used by several schools as a summer reading assignment for their incoming freshmen, including Clemson University, Temple University, and University of Central Florida.

== Plot ==
The story begins with a brief prologue description of a 12-year-old girl drowning in the Tamassee River, the boundary between Georgia and South Carolina. From then on, the story is told from the point of view of Maggie Glenn, a 28-year-old photographer for The Messenger newspaper assigned to cover the story.

=== Part One (Ch. 1-5) ===
The story begins with the introduction of Maggie Glenn. She has been assigned by her boss, Lee Gervais, to cover the events surrounding the drowning of a little girl in the Tamassee River with her colleague, Allen Hemphill.

== Characters ==
=== Major characters ===
- Maggie Glenn - the narrator of the story. Maggie is a 28-year-old photographer for The Messenger newspaper and has been assigned to cover the story of the drowning. Maggie is originally from Tamassee, South Carolina.
- Allen Hemphill - assigned to cover the story of the drowning with Maggie. He is 39-years-old.

=== Minor characters ===
- Lee Gervais - Maggie's boss and managing editor of The Messenger. Lee is 38-years-old, and it is implied that he has never had to work for anything, as he comes from a wealthy family.
- Thomas Hudson - owner of The Messenger newspaper, published out of Columbia, South Carolina.

== Publication history ==
- 2004, USA, Henry Holt ISBN 0-8050-7487-2, Pub date 2004, Hardback

== Awards and nominations ==
- Weatherford Award for Best Novel (2004)
