= Alice Bier Zandén =

Danish-Swedish actress (born 1995)

- Born: 26 September 1995 (age 30)
- Occupation: Actress
- Relatives: Susanne Bier, Philip Zandén, Jessica Zandén

Alice Esther Bier Zandén (born 26 September 1995) is a Danish-Swedish actress.

She appeared in the 2016 British television series The Night Manager and played the title role in the 2023 Danish film Ehrengard: The Art of Seduction, and studied at the Danish National School of Performing Arts. She is the daughter of the Danish filmmaker Susanne Bier and the Swedish actor Philip Zandén, and a niece of the actress Jessica Zandén.

== Selected filmography ==
Zanden has appeared in:

- The Night Manager (2016)
- Ehrengard: The Art of Seduction (2023)
- En af os ryster ('One of us is shaking') (2024)
- Generationer ('Generations') (2025)
