= Sara Foster (chef) =

American chef and restaurateur

Sara Foster is an American chef, restaurateur and cookbook author in Durham, North Carolina. She is the founder and owner of the gourmet cafe and market Foster's Market, which opened in Durham in 1990. She is the author of four cookbooks, and has appeared in many national magazines. She has been a frequent guest on The Today Show and Martha Stewart Living since 1995. Foster is known for her use of fresh vegetables and herbs in southern food and for her long history of advocating for the use of locally grown produce in her restaurants and in home cooking.

== Early career ==
One of Foster's first jobs was assisting a French chef at the 1980 Olympics. She subsequently worked as a part-time chef at SoHo Charcuterie, a New American cuisine restaurant, and in the catering kitchen of Ronnie Davis of Washington Street, both in New York City. After graduating from New York Restaurant School in 1981, Foster worked alongside Martha Stewart as a chef for her catering company. Foster subsequently opened a catering business of her own in Greenwich, Connecticut.

== Foster's Market ==
Sara Foster opened Foster's Market in Durham, North Carolina in 1990, at the site of a former lawn mower repair shop. It was one of the first businesses in the region to offer prepared foods that featured local produce, specialty grocery items, locally roasted coffee and select wines. It also featured a bakery and full service catering. In its early days, the market existed primarily as a take-out shop. Over the years, customer demand for eat-in options resulted in the addition of tables both indoors and outdoors. A second location opened in Chapel Hill, North Carolina in 1998. This location was sold to acting general manager Sera Cuni in 2013 and now operates under the name of "The Root Cellar".

== Cookbooks ==
Foster's first cookbook, The Foster's Market Cookbook Recipes for Morning, Noon and Night won the Southern Independent Booksellers Alliance Book Award in 2003, an award which recognizes booksellers' favorite books of the year.

Her second cookbook, Fresh Every Day: More Great Recipes from Foster’s Market, was released in May 2005 and reached the Top 10 on Amazon and the Los Angeles Times' bestseller list.

In March 2007, she released Sara Foster's Casual Cooking: Simple Fresh Recipes for the Way We Eat Today.

Sara Foster’s Southern Kitchen released in April 2011.
