= Gena Knox =

American food writer

- Born: Reynolds, Georgia, U.S.
- Education: University of Georgia
- Occupations: Food writer, cookbook author, entrepreneur
- Known for: Founder and CEO of Fire & Flavor
- Spouse: Davis Knox
- Children: 4

Gena Knox is an American food writer, cookbook author, and entrepreneur. Her first cookbook, Gourmet Made Simple, was released in May 2008. She is also the founder and CEO of Fire & Flavor, a company specializing in grilling planks and at-home cooking products. Knox's third book, Southern My Way: Food & Family, was released in 2013.

== Career ==
Knox was born in Reynolds, Georgia, a small farming town in central Georgia. Her mother, grandmother, and great-grandmother were all talented cooks, and she credits them for instilling a love for Southern cuisine and teaching her how to cook classic Southern dishes.

Knox attended college at the University of Georgia, Athens, where she pursued a degree in landscape architecture and met her husband Davis Knox. After graduating college Gena started a catering business in Colorado and later completed a culinary program through Cooks Street Cooking School in Denver and Aspen. She then returned to Georgia to begin a career as a landscape architect in Sea Island Resort on the coast of Georgia.

While working as a landscape architect, Knox remained an avid cook and became interested in a technique called "plank grilling". She had a hard time finding retailers that offered the planks, so decided to make her own and officially founded Fire & Flavor with her husband in September 2003.

In May 2008, Knox authored and published her first cookbook, Gourmet Made Simple. Also in 2008, she was chosen by Georgia Trend magazine as one of their 40 Under 40. Knox has appeared numerous times on Good Day Atlanta and other morning shows and is a grilling expert for AOL Food in the website's ‘Summer Grilling’ Program.

== Personal life ==
Knox currently resides in Athens, Georgia with her husband and business partner, Davis Knox, and their four children.
