= Margaret Renkl =

American writer (born 1961)

- Born: 1961 (age 64–65); Andalusia, Alabama, U.S.
- Education: Auburn University (BA); University of South Carolina (MA)
- Employer: The New York Times
- Spouse: Haywood Moxley
- Children: 3

Margaret Renkl (born October 1961) is an American writer and contributing opinion writer for the New York Times who lives in Nashville, Tennessee. Renkl is the author of Late Migrations: A Natural History of Love and Loss, and two other books. Her weekly opinion columns focus on nature, politics, and culture.

== Early life and education ==
Renkl was born in Andalusia, Alabama, and moved with her family to Birmingham, Alabama as a child. Renkl spent much of her childhood out-of-doors, with frequent visits to her maternal grandparents, who remained in Lower Alabama.

Renkl's mother was descended from peanut farmers, and her father was an apartment complex developer. Renkl, who attended Auburn University, described herself as an eager and enthusiastic undergraduate student who "wanted to learn everything, read everything, think about everything." While a student, she was involved in running a literary magazine, and upon graduation, was accepted into a literature PhD program at the University of Pennsylvania. Renkl, who had never traveled farther north than Tennessee, found the northern climate inhospitable. The doctoral program, with its focus on critical theory, was a poor fit for her poetic aspirations. Renkl returned south after one semester, and later obtained a master's degree from a graduate writing program at the University of South Carolina.

== Career ==
Renkl taught high school English at Harpeth Hall, a private school in Nashville, Tennessee, from 1987 to 1997. She quit teaching after a difficult pregnancy with her second child, and spent years freelance writing for various publications, including Glamour, Guernica, Literary Hub, Oxford American, and River Teeth. In October 2009, Renkl founded Chapter16, an online literary magazine featuring Tennessee and Tennessee-adjacent writers. She stepped down as founding editor after ten years. Renkl's work began appearing in The New York Times in 2015, with an essay focusing on caregiving for elderly relatives. Soon after, she was offered a weekly column, writing early pieces on the backyard drama of nesting birds and the way the 2016 United States presidential election played out in her local neighborhood. Renkl devoted fifteen years to writing poetry, but eventually focused more on prose after concluding that poetry would "require an intensity and concentration that ultimately I just don’t have."

=== Late Migrations ===
The raw material for Renkl's 2019 nonfiction book, Late Migrations: A Natural History of Love and Loss, arose from a weekly blog she began as she and her husband dealt with caring for Renkl's parents and mother-in-law. The book interweaves short pieces on nature and the natural world with family stories and memories from Renkl's life. Renkl had not planned to turn the material into a book, considering the blog a way to process her grief. "I found that I took a lot of comfort from watching the natural cycles in my yard. I didn't actually start writing the nature essays until a few months later, when the primary season for the 2018 election really started gearing up. And all this ugliness was coming out." The book, which includes artwork by Renkl's brother, Billy Renkl, received generally favorable reviews, though some critics found the book hard to characterize.

== Influences ==
While Renkl's formal education was mainly focused around poetry, she eventually settled on her current prose style, including some notably short micro-essays. Renkl names E.B. White, Annie Dillard, Mary Oliver, Wendell Berry, and James Agee among the writers who have influenced her work. In Death of a Cat, Renkl explicitly links an existential understanding of the animal world to E.B. White's Death of a Pig. Danny Heitman of The Wall Street Journal noted that Renkl's nature writing "seems like a belated answer to White." Renkl's nature writing has been compared to naturalist writers such as Annie Dillard and Peter Matthiessen. Late Migrations was selected for Jenna Bush Hager's book club; Hager compared it to writing by Mary Oliver.

=== The South ===
Renkl is influenced by her upbringing and life in the American South. In her opinion essay "What is a Southern Writer?" Renkl grapples with the region's meaning, both in her work and for the canon as a whole, writing:

People can hardly help loving the hands that rocked their cradles or the landscapes that shaped their souls, but I doubt there’s a single writer in the South for whom life here isn’t a source of deep ambivalence. And yet all the writers I’ve mentioned had opportunities to leave—many actually did leave for a time before returning to stay. It has all made me wonder: What if being a Southern writer has nothing to do with rural tropes or lyrical prose or a lush landscape or humid heat so thick it’s hard to breathe? What if being a Southern writer is foremost a matter of growing up in a deeply troubled place and yet finding it somehow impossible to leave? Of seeing clearly the failings of home and nevertheless refusing to flee?

== Personal life ==
Renkl is married to Haywood Moxley, a writer and English teacher. They have three adult sons.

== Bibliography ==
=== Poetry ===
- The Marigold poems. Galloway Township, NJ: Still Waters Press. 1993.

=== Essays ===
- Late Migrations: A Natural History of Love and Loss. Minneapolis, MN, USA: Milkweed Editions. 2019-07-09.
- Graceland, At Last: Notes on Hope and Heartache From the American South. Minneapolis, MN, USA: Milkweed Editions. 2021-09-14.
- The Comfort of Crows: A Backyard Year. Minneapolis, MN, USA: Spiegel & Grau LLC. 2023-10-24.
