= Ron Rash =

American writer of poetry and fiction (born 1953)

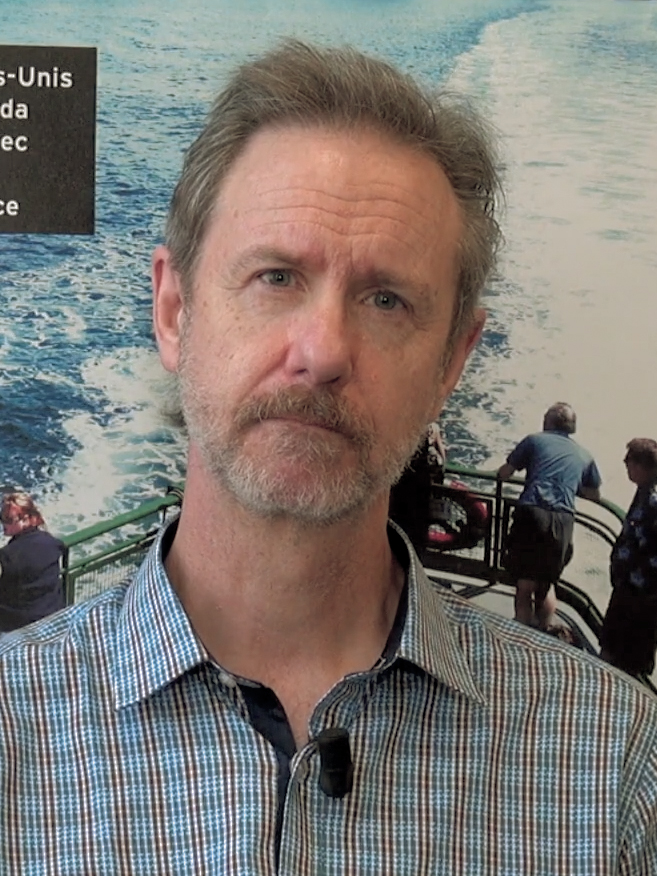
- Born: September 25, 1953 (age 73); Chester, South Carolina, U.S.
- Education: Gardner–Webb University (BA); Clemson University (MA)
- Occupations: Novelist, poet, and academic
- Spouse: Ann Rash
- Children: 1 daughter, 1 son
- Writing career
- Notable works: Serena, Burning Bright, The Cove, Nothing Gold Can Stay
- Notable awards: Frank O'Connor International Short Story Award; 2010
- Website: ronrashwriter.com

Ron Rash (born September 25, 1953) is an American poet, short story writer and novelist and the Parris Distinguished Professor in Appalachian Cultural Studies at Western Carolina University.

== Early life ==
Rash was born on September 25, 1953, in Chester, South Carolina and grew up in Boiling Springs, North Carolina. He is a graduate of Gardner–Webb University and Clemson University from which he holds a B.A. and M.A. in English, respectively.

== Career ==
Rash's poems and stories have appeared in more than 100 magazines and journals. Serena was a 2009 PEN/Faulkner Award finalist.

Rash has achieved acclaim as a short story author, winning the Frank O'Connor International Short Story Award in 2010 for Burning Bright. Recent work such as The Outlaws (Oxford American, Summer, 2013) focused on ordinary lives in southern Appalachia. Jim Coby examined Rash's use of mystery thriller tropes in One Foot in Eden.

Rash holds the John and Dorothy Parris Professorship in Appalachian Cultural Studies at Western Carolina University, where he teaches poetry and fiction in the Department of English.

== Literary work ==
One Foot in Eden (2002) was Rash's first novel. It fleshes out the characters and themes of Raising the Dead (2002), tells the story of a community displaced, disguised as a murder mystery and imbued with Rash's poetic language.

His sophomore effort, Saints at the River (2004), covers a dispute in a South Carolina community torn over the issue of environmentalism.

The World Made Straight (2006) is his third. This piece acts with dual purpose, as a coming-of-age story set in the 1970s Appalachia and a meditation on the role of the past on the present, in this case a Civil War massacre that has divided Madison County, North Carolina. It was later adapted into a feature film, directed by David Burris and released in 2015.

Next was Serena (2008), which was also adapted into a feature film, too called Serena (2014), directed by Susanne Bier and starring Jennifer Lawrence and Bradley Cooper. The film was a critical and box office failure. In both, an ambitious wife of a North Carolina timber baron, Serena, brings the spirit of Lady MacBeth to depression-era North Carolina.

In The Cove (2012), the main family is afflicted with a series of grave misfortunes. Their lives, particularly Laurel's, are interrupted at the arrival of a mute stranger who has been found after suffering a severe number of wasp stings.

== Awards ==
- 1987: General Electric Younger Writers Award
- 1996: The Sherwood Anderson Prize
- 2002: Novello Literary Award (One Foot in Eden)
- 2002: ForeWord Magazine's Gold Medal in Literary Fiction (One Foot in Eden)
- 2002: Appalachian Book of the Year (One Foot in Eden)
- 2004: Fiction Book of the Year by the Southern Book Critics Circle (Saints at the River)
- 2004: Fiction Book of the Year by the Southeastern Booksellers Association (Saints at the River)
- 2004: Weatherford Award for Best Novel of 2004 (Saints at the River)
- 2005: James Still Award from the Fellowship of Southern Writers
- 2005: O. Henry Prize Stories included "Speckled Trout". This story formed the basis for the first chapter of The World Made Straight.
- 2008: Finalist for the PEN/Faulkner Award for Fiction (Chemistry and Other Stories)
- 2009: Finalist for the PEN/Faulkner Award for Fiction (Serena)
- 2010: The Best American Short Stories 2010 included "The Ascent"
- 2010: Heasley Prize at Lyon College
- 2010: Frank O'Connor International Short Story Award (Burning Bright)
- 2010: Inducted into the South Carolina Academy of Authors
- 2011: SIBA Book Award (Fiction) for Burning Bright
- 2012: David J. Langum, Sr. Prize in American Historical Fiction for The Cove
- 2014: Grand Prix de Littérature Policière for The Cove
- 2018: The Best American Short Stories 2018 (Fiction) for "The Baptism"

=== New York Times Bestseller list ===
- Serena was listed as #34 for Hardcover Fiction in the November 2, 2008 issue of The New York Times Book Review.
- The Cove was listed as #16 for Hardcover Fiction in the April 29, 2012 issue of The New York Times Book Review and remained on the list as #29, #22, and #31 for the three subsequent weeks.
- Nothing Gold Can Stay was listed as #28 for Hardcover Fiction in the March 10, 2013 issue of The New York Times Book Review.

== List of works ==
=== Novels ===
- One Foot in Eden (2002)
- Saints at the River (2004)
- The World Made Straight (2006)
- Serena (2008)
- The Cove (2012)
- Above the Waterfall (2015)
- The Risen (2016)
- The Caretaker (2023)

=== Short story collections ===
- The Night The New Jesus Fell to Earth and Other Stories from Cliffside, North Carolina (1994)
- Casualties (2000)
- Chemistry and Other Stories (2007)
  - Thirteen short stories, eight of which were previously published in Casualties ("Chemistry," "Last Rite," "Not Waving But Drowning," "Overtime," "Cold Harbor", "Honesty", "Dangerous Love," "The Projectionist's Wife,"). Also includes the O. Henry Prize Winner "Speckled Trout" as well as "Pemberton's Bride," a story that gives a taste of Rash's forthcoming novel.
- Burning Bright (2010)
- Nothing Gold Can Stay (2013)
- Something Rich and Strange (2014)
- In the Valley (2020)
  - Stories and a novella based on Serena

=== Poetry ===
- Eureka Mill (1998)
- Among the Believers (2000)
- Raising the Dead (2002)
- Waking (2011)

=== Children's book ===
- The Shark's Tooth (2001)

=== Magazine publications ===
- The Woman at the Pond (The Southern Review, Vol. 46.4, 2010)
- The Outlaws (Oxford American, Summer, 2013)
