= Love Is All You Need =

- Theatrical poster
- Directed by: Susanne Bier
- Screenplay by: Anders Thomas Jensen
- Story by: Susanne Bier; Anders Thomas Jensen
- Produced by: Sisse Graum Jørgensen; Vibeke Windeløv
- Starring: Pierce Brosnan; Trine Dyrholm; Kim Bodnia
- Cinematography: Morten Søborg
- Edited by: Pernille Bech Christensen; Morten Egholm
- Music by: Johan Söderqvist
- Production companies: Zentropa Productions; Arte
- Distributed by: Nordisk Film (Scandinavia); Teodora Film (Italy); Les Films du Losange (France); Prokino Filmverleih (Germany)
- Release dates: 2 September 2012 (Venice); 6 September 2012 (Denmark); 16 November 2012 (Sweden); 22 November 2012 (Germany); 19 December 2012 (France); 20 December 2012 (Italy)
- Running time: 116 minutes
- Countries: Denmark; Sweden; Italy; France; Germany
- Languages: Danish; English; Italian
- Budget: €5.5 million ($7.1 million)
- Box office: $16.7 million

Love Is All You Need (Danish: Den skaldede frisør, lit. 'The Bald Hairdresser') is a 2012 Danish romantic comedy film directed by Susanne Bier and starring Pierce Brosnan and Trine Dyrholm.

== Plot ==
Danish hairdresser Ida (Trine Dyrholm), who has recently completed a successful breast cancer treatment after undergoing a mastectomy, returns home to find her husband Leif having an affair with his accountant, Tilde. In a different part of Copenhagen, English businessman Philip (Pierce Brosnan) is a successful exporter of fruits and vegetables who has become misanthropic after the death of his wife.

Meanwhile, Ida's daughter Astrid and Philip's son Patrick have gone to Italy to prepare Patrick's family's villa for their wedding, which is to take place only three months after they met.

Ida is in denial about her husband leaving her. She intends to travel alone to Italy for the wedding, but at Copenhagen airport, she bumps into Philip for the first time (her car collides with Philip's). After he shouts at her for being a reckless driver, he realizes she is Astrid's mother, and the two travel the rest of the way to the villa together. They do not have a favourable view of one another, as Philip finds Ida irritating, while Ida thinks that Philip is rude and mean.

At the villa, drama ensues when Leif brings his new girlfriend, Tilde, to the wedding and everyone is surprised when she introduces herself as his fiancée. Upset, Ida goes for a swim in the cove near the house. Philip sees her swimming nude and runs to urge her out of the water as the current can be dangerous. On their walk home, he shows her the groves of lemon and orange trees on the estate.

Philip begins to feel attracted to Ida's warm and sunny personality, and eventually confides the way in which his wife died to her. He also rejects the advances of Benedikte, his sister-in-law. At a celebration before the wedding, Philip dances with Ida. He allows Leif to cut in, but after he pushes Ida around, their son comes to Ida's rescue and punches Leif. Philip then tells Ida she's beautiful and wonderful, but they are interrupted by Benedikte.

Back at the party, Patrick sees Astrid grinding on Alessandro, a hired hand at the villa. He breaks them apart, but Astrid tells him that he is gay. When he goes to apologize to Alessandro, the two end up kissing.

The morning of the wedding, Patrick disappears. Philip finds him and Patrick confesses that he doesn't want to marry and only did it in part because he thought it was something Philip would want him to do. Before the ceremony, Patrick and Astrid inform the guests they will not be getting married. Ida goes to comfort Astrid, and Philip comforts Patrick. Philip is able to say goodbye to Ida before she leaves, but they do not say anything of consequence.

Sometime later, after arriving back in Denmark, Ida comes home to a house filled with roses. Leif tells Ida he still loves her and apologizes to her for leaving her for Tilde. Philip meanwhile finds his life cold and unsatisfactory. He goes to visit Ida at the salon where she works and tells her that he is cutting back on his workload and moving to Italy. He asks Ida to come and visit him. Ida tells him that Leif has moved back and that she loves him. Back at home, Ida realizes she no longer loves Leif and dumps him.

Ida goes to Italy, ditching her wig and wearing her short hair, which is growing back from chemo. She goes to Italy, where she finds Philip, who has gone back to working in the lemon orchard on his estate. She asks him to sit with her while she opens a letter from the hospital, giving her latest test results. Philip and Ida kiss before they open the letter. After reading the results, they smile and then kiss again.

== Cast ==
- Pierce Brosnan as Philip
- Trine Dyrholm as Ida
- Kim Bodnia as Leif
- Paprika Steen as Benedikte
- Sebastian Jessen as Patrick
- Molly Blixt Egelind as Astrid
- Christiane Schaumburg-Müller as Tilde
- Micky Skeel Hansen as Kenneth
- Bodil Jørgensen as Lizzie
- Line Kruse as Bitten
- Ciro Petrone as Alessandro

== Location ==
The southern Italian scenes were shot in Sorrento and on the Amalfi Coast.

== Soundtrack ==
The film's soundtrack features multiple versions of the song "That's Amore".

== Reception ==
On review aggregator Rotten Tomatoes, 75% of 108 reviews are positive, with an average of 6.4/10. The critics consensus reads, "Undeniably slight and fluffy, Love Is All You Need is redeemed by its picturesque setting and warm performances by Pierce Brosnan and Trine Dyrholm." Metacritic assigned the film a score of 60 out of 100 based on 26 critics, indicating "mixed or average reviews".

== Awards and accolades ==
In 2013, Love Is All You Need was selected as best comedy film at the 26th European Film Awards.
