= Serena (novel) =

2008 novel by Ron Rash

- Author: Ron Rash
- Cover artist: Jessica Shatan Heslin, Studio Shatan, Inc.
- Language: English
- Genre: Fiction
- Published: 2008 HarperCollins
- Publication place: United States
- Media type: Print Hardback
- Pages: 384
- ISBN: 0061470856
- OCLC: 190621358
- Dewey Decimal: 813'.54 dc22
- LC Class: PS3568.A698 S47 2008

Serena is a 2008 novel by Ron Rash. Set in 1930s North Carolina, the novel tells the story of newlywed couple Serena and George Pemberton and their timber business. It was listed as #34 on the New York Times Bestseller list for Hardcover Fiction in the November 2, 2008, issue of The New York Times Book Review. It has been adapted into a film by the same name starring Bradley Cooper and Jennifer Lawrence.

== Plot ==
The year is 1929, and newlyweds George and Serena Pemberton travel from Boston to the North Carolina mountains where they plan to create a timber empire. George has already lived in the camp long enough to father an illegitimate child by young Rachel Harmon but Serena is new to the mountains. Upon stepping off the train in Waynesville, George is confronted by Rachel's father, Abe Harmon, who is angry that George has abandoned his daughter. Abe attacks George with bowie knife. Ultimately George wins the battle and kills Abe. George also meets his business partners Wilkie and Buchanan at the train station and introduces them to his new wife, Serena.

Serena will soon show herself to be the equal of any man, overseeing crews, hunting rattlesnakes, even saving her husband's life in the wilderness. Together, the Pembertons ruthlessly kill or vanquish all who fall out of favor. Meanwhile, Rachel Harmon struggles to take care of her son, Jacob. When Serena learns that she will never bear a child, she sets out to murder the son George fathered without her. Mother and child begin a struggle for their lives, and when Serena suspects George is protecting his illegitimate family, the Pembertons' intense, passionate marriage starts to unravel.

In the climax, Serena poisons George and leaves him to die in the woods. Desperately, he attempts to drag himself back to the lumber camp, certain that Serena will be waiting and that everything will be as it was before. Hearing the sound of light footsteps, George is certain that Serena has changed her mind and is returning for him. It is implied, though, that he is finished off by a panther.

In an epilogue set in 1975, an elderly Rachel Harmon reads a Life Magazine interview with Serena, who has prospered as a lumber baroness in Brazil, in a Seattle hospital. On his next visit, Rachel shows the interview to her son.

Soon after, Serena and her henchman, Galloway, are murdered in their hacienda by an assailant armed with a knife. A guard comes on the scene as Serena is dying, however, and identifies her fleeing killer as identical to an old photograph of George. The guard's account is discounted by the Brazilian police.

=== Major characters ===
- Serena Pemberton - Protagonist and Pemberton’s wife. Cunning, manipulative and greedy.
- George Pemberton - Serena's husband and business partner.
- Rachel Harmon - The sixteen-year-old mother of George's illegitimate child, Jacob.
- Galloway - Serena's henchman.
- Mrs. Galloway - Galloway's blind mother who can tell the future of people around her.
- Mr. Harris - A newest partner of Serena and Pemberton who buys land to harvest the mineral instead of logging.
- Mr. Buchanan - One of the Pemberton's business partners.
- Mr. Wilkie - One of the Pemberton's business partners.
- Jacob Harmon - Son of Rachel Harmon and George Pemberton.
- Sheriff McDowell - Sheriff of Waynesville.
- Snipes - A crew foreman.
- Ezra Campbell - Pemberton's bookkeeper.
- Doctor Cheney - The camp's doctor.
- Joel Vaughn - Rachel's friend.
- Preacher McIntyre - preacher that works for Boston Lumber.
- Adeline Jenkins - Rachel's neighbor, who helps take care of Jacob.

== Major themes ==
Greed, corruption, murder, illegitimacy, obsession, childbirth, timber baron, remote mountain life, 1920s, Gender roles, jealousy, lawlessness, mental illness, desperation.

== Awards and nominations ==
- Finalist, 2009: Fiction for the PEN/Faulkner Award
- Listed as #34 on The New York Times Bestseller list for Hardcover Fiction in the November 2, 2008 issue of The New York Times Book Review.

== Film adaptation ==
A film adaptation, Serena, starring Bradley Cooper and Jennifer Lawrence as George and Serena Pemberton, was released in October 2014 to negative reviews.

Major adaptations from the book: Title character is given a deep background in timber business; Greek chorus of loggers omitted; film story not told from Serena's point of view.
