= Motaz Malhees =

Palestinian actor (born 1992)

- معتز ملحّيس
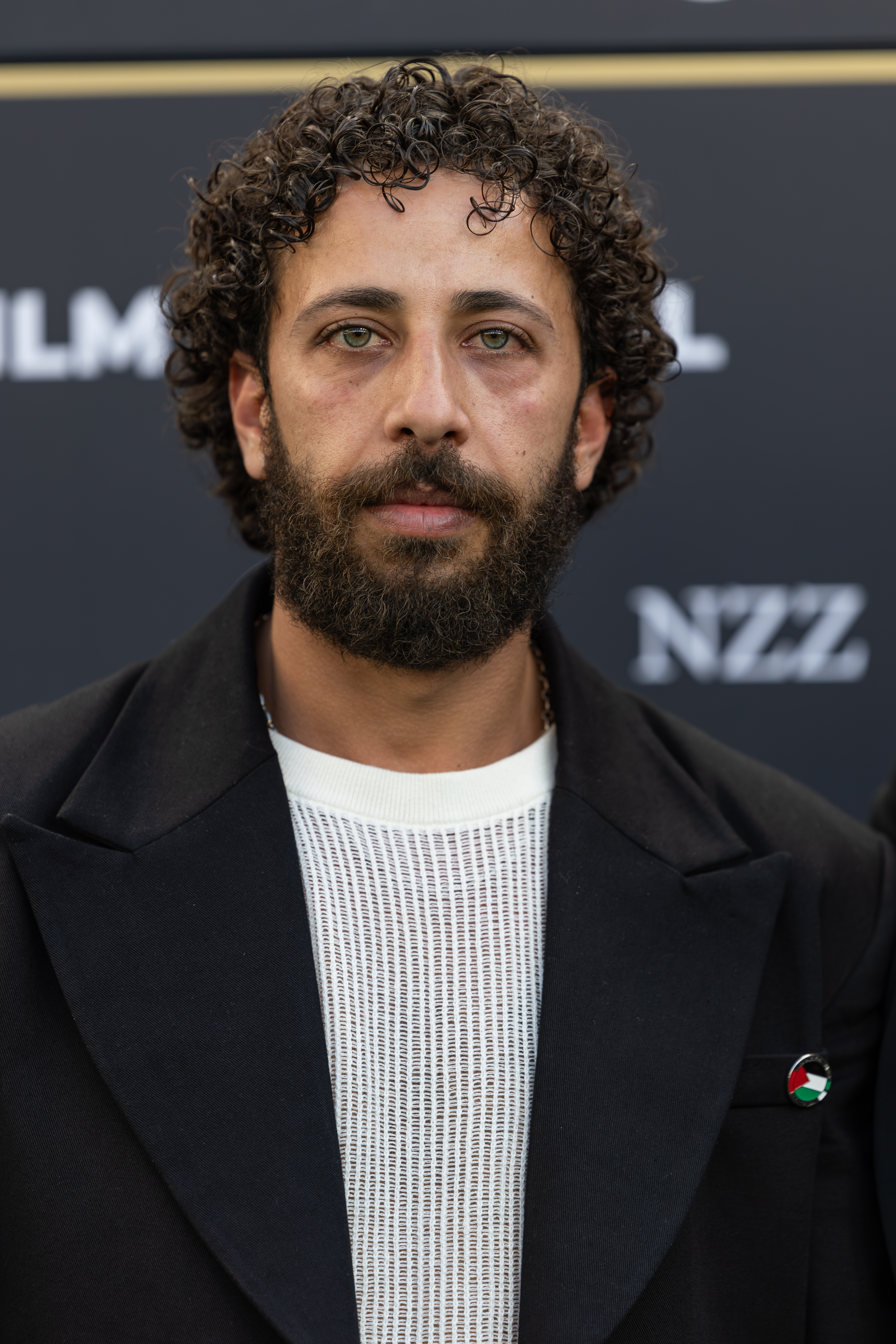
- Malhees at the 2025 Zurich Film Festival
- Born: 21 December 1992 (age 33); Jenin, Palestine
- Education: The Freedom Theatre
- Years active: 2014–present

Motaz Malhees (Arabic: معتز ملحّيس; born 21 December 1992) is a Palestinian actor based in London. He starred in the films 200 Meters (2020) and The Voice of Hind Rajab (2025).

== Early life ==
Malhees was born in Jenin. At age 16, he left school to audition for the Freedom Theatre's acting school, going on to graduate in 2014.

== Career ==
After beginning his career in theatre, Malhees made his feature film debut starring as Kifah in Ameen Nayfeh's family drama 200 Meters, which premiered at the 2020 Venice International Film Festival. The film later had a wide release on Netflix in 2022. In 2024, Malhees appeared in the horror film Speak No Evil with James McAvoy.

Malhees next starred in Kaouther Ben Hania's docudrama film The Voice of Hind Rajab, which premiered at the 2025 Venice International Film Festival. Malhees portrayed Omar Alaqam, the real-life Palestine Red Crescent Society (PRCS) worker who answered the titular 6-year-old's call for help as she was attacked by the IDF. Although The Voice of Hind Rajab was Academy Award-nominated, Malhees revealed he was unable to enter the U.S. as a Palestinian citizen to attend the awards ceremony in March 2026 due to Donald Trump's travel ban.

Malhees has an upcoming role in the Channel 4 drama The Siege.

== Personal life ==
Malhees lives in London.

== Filmography ==
Year	Title	Role	Notes
2017	The Crossing	Mohammed	Short film
2020	200 Meters	Kifah	
2020	The Dream	The Man	Short film
2021	The 50th Psalm		Short film
2021	Blacklisted	Basel	Short film
2022	Hamza: Chase the Ghost Chasing Me		Short film
2024	Speak No Evil	Muhjid	
2025	The Voice of Hind Rajab	Omar A. Alaqam	
TBA	The Siege		
