= 200 Meters (film) =

2020 Palestinian film

- Film poster
- Directed by: Ameen Nayfeh
- Written by: Ameen Nayfeh
- Produced by: Julia Gebauer; Faycal Hassairi; Francesco Melzi d'Eril; May Odeh
- Starring: Ali Suliman; Anna Unterberger; Motaz Malhees
- Cinematography: Elin Kirschfink
- Edited by: Kamal El Mallakh
- Music by: Faraj Suleiman
- Production company: Odeh Films
- Release date: 9 September 2020 (Venice)
- Running time: 96 minutes
- Countries: Palestine; Jordan; Qatar; Sweden; Italy
- Languages: Palestinian Arabic, Hebrew, English
- Box office: $76,670

200 Meters (Arabic: 200 متر) is a 2020 adventure drama film written and directed by Ameen Nayfeh in his feature-length debut. The film premiered in the 17th edition of the Giornate degli Autori section at the 77th Venice International Film Festival on 9 September 2020, where it won the BNL People's Choice Audience Award. It was selected as the Jordanian entry for the Best International Feature Film at the 93rd Academy Awards, but it was not nominated. It won the IFFI ICFT UNESCO Gandhi Medal at 51st International Film Festival of India in January 2021.

== Plot ==
The film revolves around a family in the Palestinian city of Tulkarm, separated by the Israeli wall, and the efforts of the father who tries to visit his son on the other side of the wall.

== Cast ==
- Ali Suliman as Mustafa
- Anna Unterberger as Anne
- Motaz Malhees as Kifah

== Production ==
The film was shot in Tulkarm in the West Bank in 2019.

== Release ==
200 Meters had its world premiere in the 17th edition of the Giornate degli Autori section at the 77th Venice International Film Festival on 9 September 2020. It was screened at the El Gouna Film Festival in October 2020 and at 51st International Film Festival of India under IFFI ICFT UNESCO Gandhi Medal in January 2021. It had an international release on 9 June 2021 and a limited release in USA by Film Movement on 18 November 2022. It was released on VOD by Film Movement Video on 6 December 2022.

== Reception ==
=== Box office ===
200 Meters grossed $76,670 in France and Italy.

=== Critical response ===
The review aggregator website Rotten Tomatoes reported a 90% approval rating, with an average score of 7.5/10, based on 20 reviews.

=== Accolades ===
Year	Award	Category	Recipient(s)	Result	Ref.
2020	Antalya Golden Orange Film Festival	Best Actor	Ali Suliman	Won	
2020	El Gouna Film Festival	Best Actor	Ali Suliman	Won	
2020	El Gouna Film Festival	FIPRESCI Award	Ameen Nayfeh	Won	
2020	El Gouna Film Festival	Cinema for Humanity Prize	Ameen Nayfeh	Won	
2020	Thessaloniki International Film Festival	Best Feature Film	Ameen Nayfeh	Won	
2020	Thessaloniki International Film Festival	Special Jury Award for Best Director	Ameen Nayfeh	Won	
2020	International Film Festival of India	CFT UNESCO - Gandhi Award	Ameen Nayfeh	Won	
2020	Golden Rooster Awards	Best International Film	Ameen Nayfeh	Won	
2020	Le Giornate degli Autori	The BNL People's Choice Award	Ameen Nayfeh	Won	
2021	Atlanta Jewish Film Festival	Human Rights Jury Prize	Ameen Nayfeh	Won	
2021	Fajr International Film Festival	Best Script	Ameen Nayfeh	Won	
2021	Fajr International Film Festival	Best Film	Ameen Nayfeh	Won	
2021	Camerimage	Directors' Debuts	Ameen Nayfeh	Nominated	
2024	Sahara International Film Festival	White Camel winner	Ameen Nayfeh, Ahmad Al-Bazz	Won	

== See also ==
- List of submissions to the 93rd Academy Awards for Best International Feature Film
- List of Jordanian submissions for the Academy Award for Best International Feature Film
- List of Palestinian films
