= Sahara International Film Festival =

Film festival held in the Sahrawi refugee camps, Algeria

Sahara International Film Festival Festival de Cine del Sáhara الصحراء السينمائي الدولي

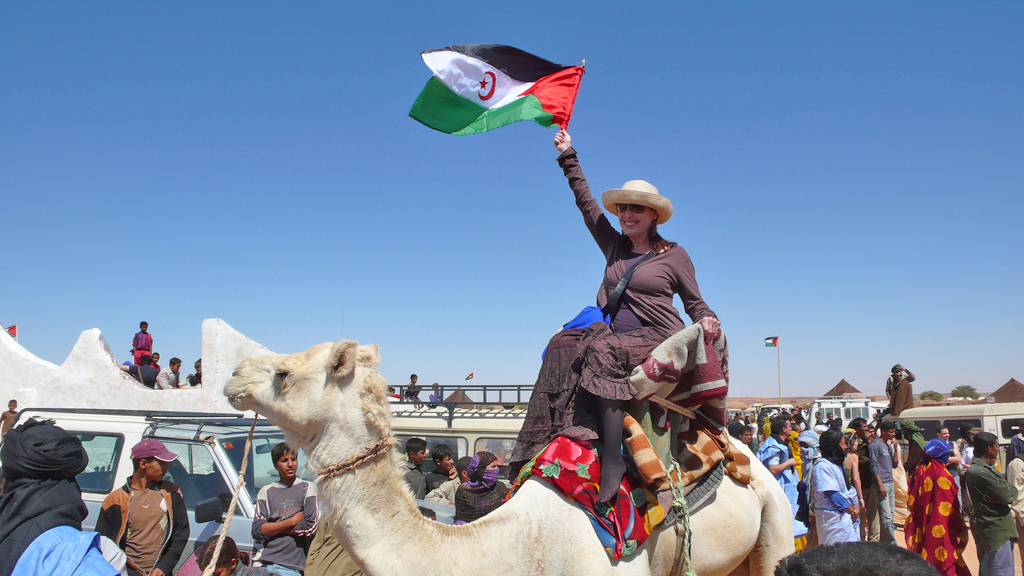
- Spanish actress Verónica Forqué at FiSahara IV (2007)
- Location: Sahrawi refugee camps, Tindouf, Algeria
- Founded: 2003; 23 years ago
- Awards: White Camel
- Website: fisahara.es

The Sahara International Film Festival, also known as FiSahara, is an annual event which takes place in the Sahrawi refugee camps, at the southwest corner of Algeria, near the border with Western Sahara. It is the only film festival in the world held in a refugee camp. The first festival was in large part organised by Peruvian film director Javier Corcuera.

For its first three years, FiSahara was held alternately in the Wilaya of Smara, the Wilaya of Ausserd, and the Wilaya of El Aaiún. Since 2007, the festival has been staged in the Wilaya of Dajla. The event is backed by the Polisario Front, but largely organised and funded by donors from Spain, the former colonial power in Western Sahara. The festival has attracted support from Spanish film celebrities, including Penélope Cruz, Javier Bardem, and Pedro Almodóvar. Musicians like Fermín Muguruza, Manu Chao, Macaco, Iván Ferreiro, El Chojin and Tomasito have performed in concerts during the festival.

FiSahara is billed as an initiative to bring film as an entertainment and cultural form to the thousands of Sahrawis who live in the Algerian desert. It also aims to provide cultural entertainment and educational opportunities to the refugees.

In 2010, a twinning agreement was signed between the FiSahara and the San Sebastian Human Rights Film Festival.

== White Camel winners ==
The White Camel (Arabic: الجمل الأبيض) is the festival's top prize, awarded for the best film by election of the spectators. It consists of a white female camel, which is traditionally donated to the refugee family who hosted the actors or director of the winning film during the festival. The winners receive a trophy depicting a white camel and a desert rose.

Edition	Winner	Original title	Director(s)	Production country(ies)	Ref.
1st (20–23 November 2003)	The Living Forest	O bosque animado	Ángel de la Cruz and Manolo Gómez	Spain	
2nd (3–6 March 2005)	Madame Brouette	L'extraordinaire destin de Madame Brouette	Moussa Sene Absa	Senegal, France and Canada	
3rd (4–9 April 2006)	The Story of the Weeping Camel	Die Geschichte vom weinenden Kamel	Byambasuren Davaa and Luigi Falorni	Mongolia and Germany	
4th (10–15 April 2007)	Azur & Asmar: The Princes' Quest	Azur et Asmar	Michel Ocelot	France, Belgium, Italy and Spain	
5th (15–20 April 2008)	It's a Free World...		Ken Loach	United Kingdom, Italy, Germany, Spain, Poland and France	
6th (5–10 May 2009)	Che: Part Two		Steven Soderbergh	Spain, France, United States and Germany	
7th (26 April–2 May 2010)	The Problem: Testimony of the Sahrawi People	El problema. Testimonio del pueblo saharaui	Jordi Ferrer and Pablo Vidal	Spain	
8th (2–8 May 2011)	Among Wolves	Entrelobos	Gerardo Olivares	Spain and Germany	
9th (1–6 May 2012)	Sons of the Clouds: The Last Colony	Hijos de las nubes: la última colonia	Álvaro Longoria	Spain	
10th (8–13 October 2013)	Mayibuye I		Milly Moabl	South Africa	
11th (29 April–4 May 2014)	Legna	Legna: habla el verso saharaui	Juan Ignacio Robles, Bahia Mahmud Awah and Juan Carlos Gimeno	Spain and (Sahrawi Arab Democratic Republic) Western Sahara	
12th (28 April–3 May 2015)	Granito: How to Nail a Dictator		Pamela Yates	United States	
13th (11–16 October 2016)	Leyuad: A Trip to the Verses Well	Leyuad, un viaje al pozo de los versos	Gonzalo Moure, Brahim Chagaf and Inés G. Aparicio	(Sahrawi Arab Democratic Republic) Western Sahara and Spain	
14th (2–6 December 2018)	Soukeina, 4400 Days of Night	Soukeina, 4400 días de noche	Laura Sipán	Spain	
15th (15–20 October 2019)	Champions	Campeones	Javier Fesser	Spain	
16th (28 November–1 December 2021)	Toufa	توفة	Brahim Chagaf	(Sahrawi Arab Democratic Republic) Western Sahara	
17th (11–16 October 2022)	Wanibik: The People Who Live in Front of Their Land	وَانِي بِيك	Rabah Slimani	Algeria	
18th (29 April–5 May 2024)	200 Meters	٢٠٠ متر	Ameen Nayfeh	Palestine	
19th (27 April–3 May 2026)	All That's Left of You	اللي باقي منك	Cherien Dabis	Palestine, Jordan, Cyprus, Greece, Germany, Qatar, Saudi Arabia, United States and Egypt	

== Guest country ==
In some years, the festival has chosen a country to be a guest in the event. In such cases, films from the guest country are screened, and related events take place along with the other acts in the festival.

Year	Guest Country
2006	Cuba
2009	Algeria
2010	South Africa
2011	Venezuela
2012	Mexico
2013	United States
2014	South Africa
2023	Spain
