= Alexej Manvelov =

Swedish actor (born 1982)

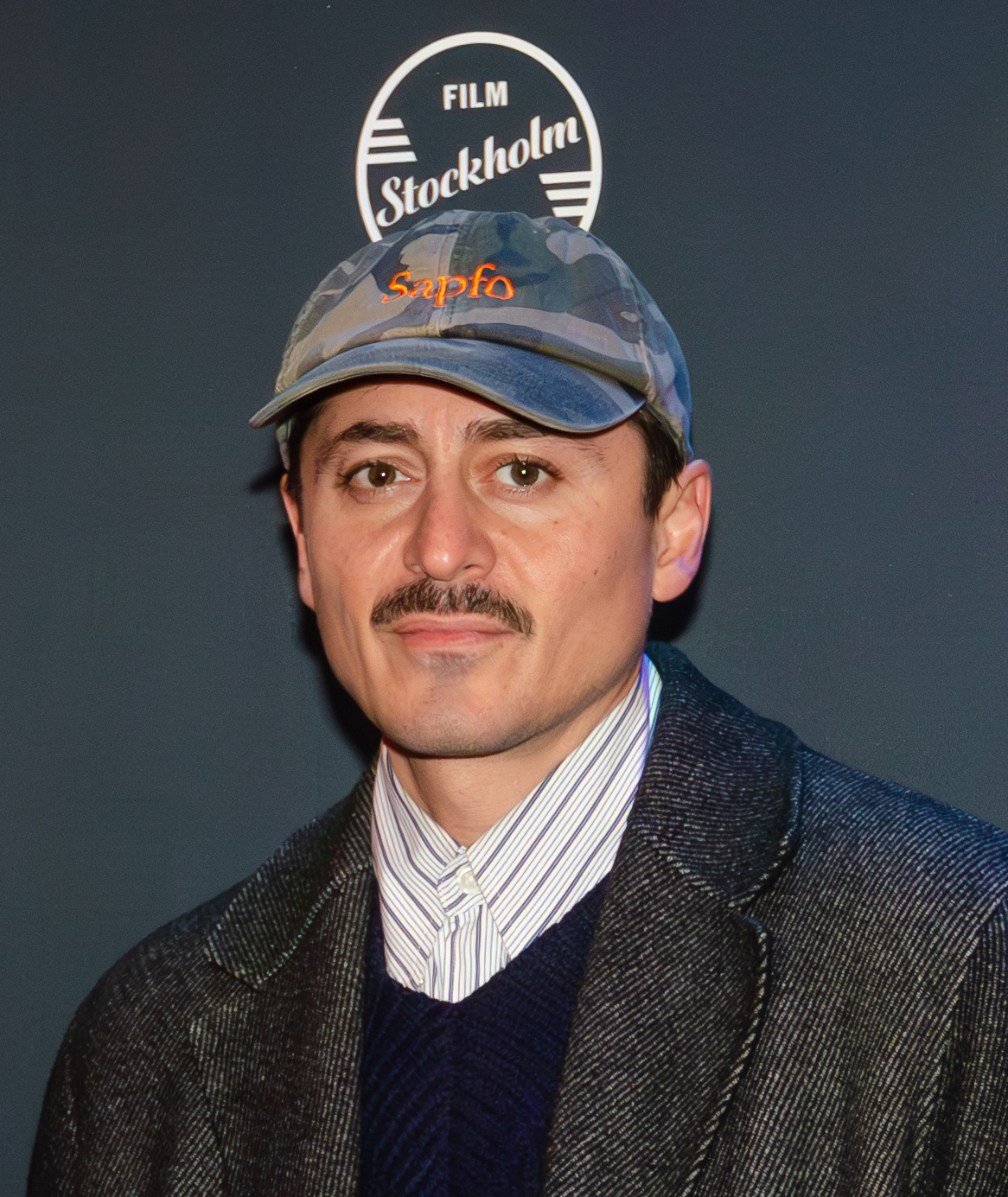
- Manvelov at the Stockholm International Film Festival in 2023
- Born: 31 March 1982 (age 44); Moscow, Soviet Union
- Occupation: Actor
- Years active: 2009–present
- Television: Dept. Q

Alexej Manvelov (born 31 March 1982) is a Swedish television and film actor known for playing Akram Salim in the 2025 Scottish crime thriller television series Dept. Q. He was also featured in the historical limited series Chernobyl (2019) and the third season of Jack Ryan (2022). He has also been featured in Swedish-language works, including Before We Die (2017), Sthlm Requiem (2018), Top Dog (2020), and A Day and a Half (2023).

== Early life and education ==
Alexej Manvelov was born in 1982 in Moscow to a Russian mother and a Kurdish father from Syria. He moved to Sweden at the age of ten, and grew up in Ljungsbro near Linköping.

He worked in the construction industry before moving to Stockholm to pursue his dream of becoming an actor.

== Career ==
Manvelov portrayed Davor, a Croatian gang leader, in the 2017 Swedish television series Before We Die. He had gained the attention of producer Marianne Nordenberg for his previous role in the Swedish series Arne Dahl: Dödsmässa. He also appeared in the Swedish series Jordskott and as Teddy in the 2020 Top Dog. He had a leading role in the 2023 Swedish film A Day and a Half.

He had roles in the historical English-language series Chernobyl and Jack Ryan, as well as the 2022 film The Contractor. He has a main role in the 2025 Scottish crime thriller television series Dept. Q, in which he portrayes the character Akram Salim.

== Partial filmography ==
Year	Title	Role	Notes
2009	Soundcheck	Domino	
2015	Arne Dahl: Dödsmässa	Michail Botkin	2 episodes
2015–2020	Occupied	Nikolai	16 episodes
2017	Jordskott	Dr. Parker	8 episodes
2017–2019	Before We Die	Davor	14 episodes
2018	Sthlm Requiem	Peder	10 episodes
2018	The Unthinkable	Tholen	Film
2019	Chernobyl	Garo	1 episode
2020–2023	Top Dog	Teddy	14 episodes
2022	The Contractor	Asset	Film
2022	Jack Ryan	Alexei Petrov	8 episodes
2023	A Day and a Half	Artan	Film
2025	Dept. Q	Akram Salim	Main role
TBA	The Siege	TBA	Upcoming drama series
