= Hotel for the Holidays =

- Directed by: Ron Oliver
- Written by: Maggie Lane; Margarita Matthews
- Produced by: David Anselmo
- Starring: Madelaine Petsch; Mena Massoud; Max Lloyd-Jones
- Cinematography: Russ Goozee
- Edited by: David B. Thompson
- Music by: Stephen Krecklo; Sean Nimmons-Paterson
- Production companies: Hideaway Pictures; HP Hotel Holiday Productions; Motion Picture Corporation of America
- Distributed by: Amazon Freevee
- Release date: December 2, 2022
- Running time: 84 minutes
- Country: Canada
- Language: English

Hotel for the Holidays is an American romantic comedy film written by Maggie Lane and Margarita Matthews, directed by Ron Oliver, and starring Madelaine Petsch and Mena Massoud. It was released on Amazon Freevee on December 2, 2022.

== Plot ==
The film revolves around the staff and guests at New York City's Hotel Fontaine during the christmas season. The personal and work life of the hotel's manager, Georgia, become entangled when she is torn between Luke, the hotel's resident chef, and Raymond, a former prince staying at the hotel over the holidays.

== Cast ==
- Madelaine Petsch as Georgia, the young owner of Hotel Fontaine
- Mena Massoud as Luke, Georgia’s boyfriend and the chef of Hotel Fontaine
- Max Lloyd-Jones as Prince Raymond
- AJ Zoldy as the Bodyguard, Raymond’s unnamed assistant
- Kayleigh Shikanai as Pandora
- Jamison Belushi as Kiki
- Neil Crone as Milton
- Jayne Eastwood as Florence

== Production ==
Mena Massoud and Madelaine Petsch first met as guests on the talk show A Little Late with Lilly Singh. In August 2022, Massoud teased the release of Hotel for the Holidays by sharing a photo of himself with Petsch on Instagram. It was produced by Brad Krevoy's Motion Picture Corporation of America. The film is set in New York City but was filmed in Ottawa, Canada, primarily at the Fairmont Hotel.

== Release ==
The trailer was released on November 9, 2022. The film was released on Amazon Freevee in the United States, United Kingdom, and Germany on December 2, 2022.
