= A Day and a Half =

2023 Swedish thriller film

- English-language promotional poster
- Swedish: En dag och en halv
- Directed by: Fares Fares
- Written by: Fares Fares; Peter Smirnakos
- Produced by: Christina Legkova; Hanna Lundmark
- Starring: Alexej Manvelov; Alma Pöysti; Fares Fares
- Distributed by: Netflix
- Release date: 1 September 2023
- Running time: 94 minutes
- Country: Sweden
- Language: Swedish

A Day and a Half (Swedish: En dag och en halv) is a 2023 Swedish thriller film directed by Fares Fares, in his directorial debut. It was written by Fares and Peter Smirnakos. The film opens with Artan (Alexej Manvelov) storming the clinic his estranged wife Louise (Alma Pöysti) works at. Armed with a handgun, he demands to see his daughter, who Louise has custody of. Police officer Lukas (Fares) responds to the scene and the trio go on a high-stakes road trip of sorts, where the reasons for their custody dispute and marital difficulties are revealed. The film premiered on Netflix on 1 September 2023.

== Plot ==
Artan goes to the medical clinic where his estranged wife Louise works and demands to speak to her. When he is rebuffed by the receptionist, he reveals he has a gun. He locks down the clinic and confronts a terrified Louise; she did not turn up at their meeting yesterday where he was supposed to be see their daughter Cassandra. He holds her at gunpoint and strikes a man he believes she is sleeping with. He allows for one person to come in alone, and — with trained hostage negotiators hours away — local police officer Lukas goes in.

Artan demands an unmarked car, and the trio make their way to the car. As they travel towards Louise’s parents’ house to get Cassandra, more details are revealed about their relationship. Artan was convicted of assault for pushing Louise’s father, although he claims he tripped, and sentenced to three months in prison. He then lost custody of Cassandra. The car is running low on gas, so they have to make a stop. Artan and Louise continue to argue about their relationship; a core issue is the several-month period that Louise left after the birth of Cassandra. It turns out she had postpartum psychosis, and while Louise was in treatment Artan took up with another woman.

They make it to Louise’s parents’ house to pick up Cassandra. Her father Stefan makes racist and xenophobic remarks to Artan, while her mother Wanja makes cruel, critical comments about her daughter. Stefan tries to stop them from leaving with a rifle, but Lukas disarms him after a struggle.

Artan wants to flee to Albania, but the airlines refuse to accept a man with hostages. They still drive to Arlanda. Artan gives the phone to Lukas so he can call his son for his birthday. Artan and Louise have a heart-to-heart. Louise gives him her necklace, which design features their daughter’s heartbeat. She reveals that she meant to meet him for his planned visit with Cassandra, but fell asleep on the sofa. She says they cannot be together anymore but promises he will be able to see Cassandra. He unloads his gun and gives it to Louise. She rolls down the window and drops it on the ground outside. They share a tearful embrace and Artan apologizes. The tactical team approaches, and pull Artan out of the car to arrest him. The film ends with a hopeful look from Artan as the police lead him away in handcuffs.

== Cast ==
- Alexej Manvelov as Artan Kelmendi: a Swedish man of Albanian descent; in a custody battle over his daughter Cassandra
- Alma Pöysti as Louise Bremer: Artan's estranged wife and medical clinic worker; in a custody battle over her daughter Cassandra
- Fares Fares as Lukas Malki: a local police officer called to the scene of Artan's hostage situation
- Stina Ekblad as Wanja: Louise's hyper-critical mother
- Bengt C.W. Carlsson as Stefan: Louise's racist father
- Annica Liljeblad as Anna: receptionist at the clinic
- Annika Hallin as Kristin Gardelius: a doctor at the clinic

== Production ==
Fares met Alexej Manvelov on the set of Chernobyl (2019) and thought he would be a good fit for the role.

The producers were Christina Legkova and Hanna Lundmark.

== Reception ==
The film earned an average rating of 3.2/5 on the Swedish review aggregator site Kritiker. Writing for Dagens Nyheter, Helena Lindblad characterized the beginning of the film as stiff and uninteresting, but wrote that it became much more compelling as it went along.
