= Mena Massoud =

Egyptian-born Canadian actor (born 1991)

- مینا مسعود
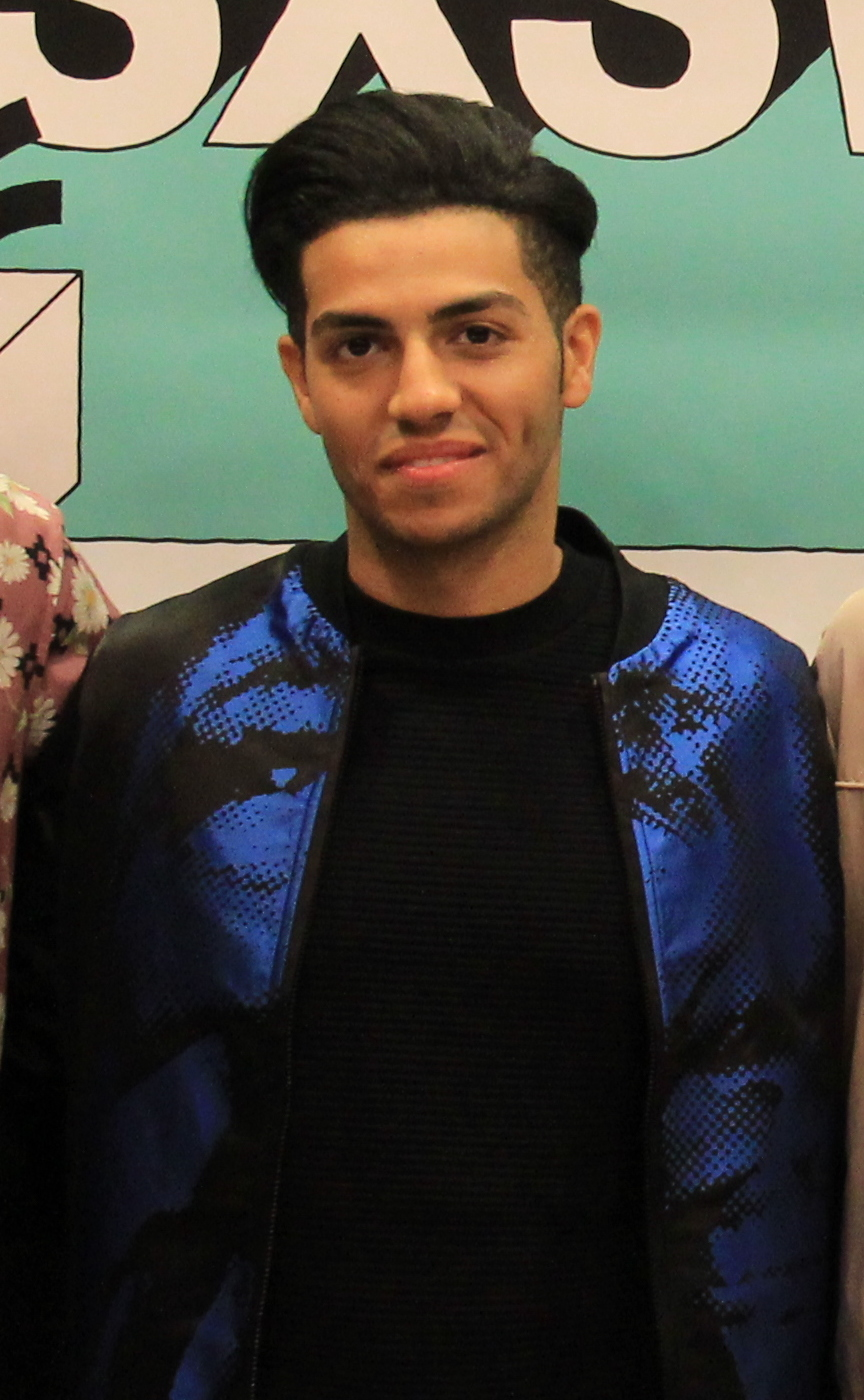
- Massoud in 2019
- Born: Mena Mansour Massoud; September 17, 1991 (age 35); Cairo, Egypt
- Education: Ryerson University
- Occupation: Actor
- Years active: 2011–present
- Spouse: Emily Shah (m. 2025)

Signature
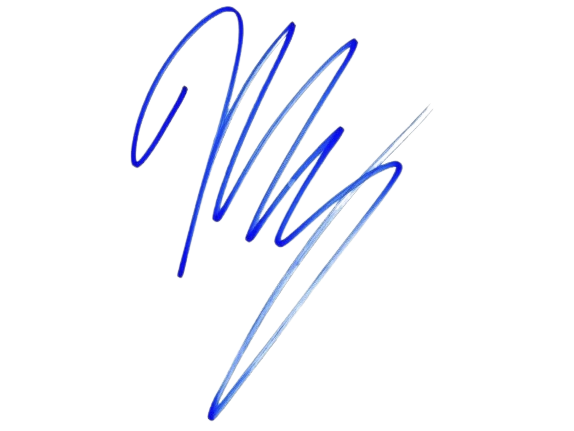

Mena Mansour Massoud (Arabic: مينا منصور مسعود; born September 17, 1991) is a Canadian actor. He made his film debut in the 2017 Canadian dramatic thriller Ordinary Days. His breakthrough came with playing the title character in the Disney fantasy film Aladdin (2019), which earned him nominations for a Teen Choice Award and two National Film & TV Awards.

Massoud also had roles in the Canadian drama series Open Heart (2015), the Amazon Prime series Tom Clancy's Jack Ryan (2018) and the Hulu series Reprisal (2019). He starred in the Netflix film The Royal Treatment (2022) and the horror film The Sacrifice Game (2023), the latter of which he also executive produced.

== Early life ==
Mena Mansour Massoud was born on September 17, 1991, in Cairo to Egyptian Coptic Orthodox Christian parents Gorgit and Mansour Massoud. He has two elder sisters, Marian and Margaret, who both work in the medical field. He and his family emigrated to Canada when he was three years old. When asked why his family left Egypt, Massoud stated:

I was born there. We immigrated when I was 3 1/2 years old, to Toronto. But I'm still very, very close to my culture and – back home in Egypt. We're Coptic Christian and my parents just felt like things were getting a little too dangerous when I was growing up in Egypt. They wanted to create a better life for their family so they decided to immigrate to Canada.

Massoud attended St. Brother André Catholic High School, where he was the head of the improv team. He later attended the University of Toronto with a major in neuroscience, in the pursuit of becoming a doctor or psychologist. Instead of finishing his degree, he auditioned for theatre schools. Massoud eventually transferred to Ryerson University for their theatre performance program, which he graduated from in 2014.

== Career ==
Massoud began acting in 2011, with guest appearances on the television series Nikita and Combat Hospital. His role in Nikita, being his first ever on-screen role, was of a terrorist. In an interview with The Daily Beast, it was stated that this role made him set a goal for himself to "find characters who aren’t terrorists or bring negative connotations because of the color of their skin or ethnicity."

In 2015, he was cast as Jared Malik in the Canadian-drama series Open Heart, which was cancelled after one season. In 2017, he starred as Ollie Santos in the film Ordinary Days, which premiered at the Atlantic International University. In 2018, he had a recurring role as Tarek Kassar in the Amazon Prime original series Jack Ryan.

In 2019, Massoud portrayed the titular character in Disney's fantasy-adventure film Aladdin, which is a live-action adaptation of the animated film of the same name. The film was a critical and commercial success, passing $1 billion in the global box office, and he received nominations for a Teen Choice Award and two National Film & TV Award nominations. In the months following the film's release, Massoud said that "I haven’t had a single audition since Aladdin came out". His role as Aladdin is credited with presenting a more positive and vibrant portrayal of an Arab character in Hollywood. Also in 2019, he played Ethan Hart in the Hulu original series Reprisal, Chaz in the thriller film Strange but True, and Kamal in the drama film Run This Town.

In January 2021, it was announced that Massoud would star in the Egyptian film Fe Ez El-Dohr. In January 2022, he starred in the Netflix film The Royal Treatment alongside Laura Marano. He was announced to star in the horror film The Sacrifice Game, which was released in 2023; he also served as an executive producer for the film.

In 2023, Massoud announced via Instagram that he is producing the film The Last King, an Iranian adaptation of The Doctor's Case by Stephen King. He is slated to reprise the role of Aladdin in an upcoming sequel.

In the same year he debuted as host of Evolving Vegan, a Canadian television series about vegan cuisine based in part on his own vegan cookbook of the same name.

Massoud starred opposite Isabelle Fuhrman in director Julia Stiles' romance drama film Wish You Were Here, released on January 17, 2025. He will star as the prophet Daniel in a 2026 film of the same name.

== Other ventures ==
In September 2019, he was appointed an ambassador by Egypt's Ministry of Migration for their new "Speak Egyptian" initiative, with the goal of preserving the Egyptian identity of those living abroad. Later that year, he launched the not-for-profit Ethnically Diverse Artists Foundation to help Canadian artists from underrepresented groups jumpstart their careers through securing mentors, training, headshots and includes support for actors, musicians, and visual artists. Speaking about his motivation for the EDA Foundation, Massoud stated, "In the industry, artists of color struggle the most. Caucasian artists have really solidified themselves in the industry, and with African Americans now we see directors and producers who vow to only produce work that shines a light on African American artists. But everybody in the middle gets lost." His mission is to make changes in the industry so that roles are cast fairly, despite the color of an artist's skin or their ethnic group. He spoke again about the foundation and his advocacy for diversity in the industry when he was honored at Egypt's third El Gouna Film Festival in 2019.

In February 2022, Massoud announced the release of his new gin, Dharma Indian Dry Gin, via an Instagram post. He created the gin alongside Emily Shah and Prashant Shah, describing it as "the world’s first & only spirit inspired by Ayurvedic practice" and "an expression of culture, willpower, and history."

== Artistry ==
Massoud is an admirer of Egyptian comedy movies, in an interview with the BBC, he stated how his Egyptian heritage has inspired him as a comedian, stating: "I grew up watching Egyptian comedy films by the great Egyptian comedians such as Ismail Yassine and Adel Emam. The way they entertain the audience with not only their words but with their body language and facial expressions is totally different from that of the actors here. I played a lot of comedy roles in American productions. My role in Aladdin is also a comedy role. I believe I play comedy roles with a different taste that I learned from our own Egyptian cinema and this makes it appealing in a different way."

Massoud takes inspiration from Robin Williams. In an interview with The Hudsucker, he stated that Robin Williams was the actor who impacted him the most, saying "He was an incredibly well-rounded actor but I grew up on his role in Mrs. Doubtfire. That role by itself is very well-rounded and he goes through an amazing journey in that movie. I think it’s very underrated."

== Personal life ==
In 2024, Massoud announced his engagement to actress Emily Shah. They married in 2025. Massoud is a vegan, and the creator of the cookbook, TV series and community with the name Evolving Vegan. He is a Coptic Orthodox Christian.

== Filmography ==
=== Film ===
Year	Title	Role	Notes
2017	Ordinary Days	Ollie Santos	
2019	Aladdin	Aladdin	
2019	Strange but True	Chaz	
2020	Run This Town	Kamal	
2021	Lamya's Poem	Rumi (voice)	
2022	The Royal Treatment	Prince Thomas	
2022	Hotel for the Holidays	Luke	
2023	The Sacrifice Game	Jude	
2023	Butterfly Tale	Patrick (voice)	
2025	Wish You Were Here	Adam	
2026	Daniel: The Fiery Furnace	Daniel	Also producer
TBA	Tecie	TBA	Post-production

=== Television ===
Year	Title	Role	Notes
2011	Nikita	Al Qaeda No. 2	1 episode
2011	Poser	Bretten Thomason	Recurring role
2011	Combat Hospital	Salman Zawab	1 episode
2011	The 99	Hafiz the Preserver / Dave / Saad	Main role
2012	Cut to the Chase	Jason	Recurring role
2012	King	Malik Atassi	1 episode
2015	Open Heart	Jared Malik	Main role
2017	Saving Hope	Justin Srinivasan	1 episode
2018	Jack Ryan	Tarek Kassar	Recurring role
2019	Reprisal	Ethan Hart	Main role
2021	9-1-1: Lone Star	Salim	1 episode
2023	History of the World, Part II	Egyptian Diplomat	1 episode
2023	Evolving Vegan	Host	

=== Video games ===
Year	Title	Role
2016	Watch Dogs 2	Various voices

== Awards and nominations ==
Year	Awards	Category	Nominated work	Result	Ref.
2019	Teen Choice Awards	Choice Sci-Fi/Fantasy Movie Actor	Aladdin	Nominated	
2019	GQ Men of the Year Awards	Breakthrough Talent	Himself	Won	
2019	National Film & TV Awards	Best Actor	Aladdin	Nominated	
2019	National Film & TV Awards	Best Newcomer	Aladdin	Nominated	
2020	Goodreads Choice Awards	Best Food & Cookbooks	Evolving Vegan	Nominated	
2024	Canadian Screen Awards	Best Host in a Lifetyle Program or Series	Evolving Vegan	Nominated	
