= Finley the Fire Engine =

British children's television series

- Genre: Preschool; Comedy; Children's animation
- Countries of origin: United Kingdom; United States; Canada
- Original language: English
- No. of seasons: 2
- No. of episodes: 78

Production
- Production companies: Balley Beg Animation Studios; RHI Entertainment; Kickstart Productions

Original release
- Network: BBC One; BBC Two; CBeebies
- Release: 23 July 2007 – 30 November 2012

Finley the Fire Engine is an American/Canadian/British animated children's television series produced by Balley Beg Animation Studios in Douglas, Isle of Man.

== Synopsis ==
The show is about talking vehicles in a fictional town called Friendlyville. 78 episodes have been aired, each running for 15 minutes. A British dub of the series was shown in the UK by the BBC's children's channel, CBeebies, from 23 July 2007 until 30 November 2012, with the voice recording studio and final mix being provided by Ten Pin Alley Limited. The show also aired on ABC in Australia from 18 March 2008 until 4 May 2014.

== Characters ==
=== Main ===
- Finley (voiced by Reece Thompson in the US) is a red male fire engine. He is good-willed and generous, lives in Fire Station No. 5, and loves nothing better than having fun with his highway pals. He sometimes sleeps with his teddy bear, Diesel.
- Dexter ("Dex") (voiced by Jay Simon in the UK and Andrew Francis in the US) is a blue male dump truck who is the semi-anti hero of the show. Despite being a bit of a bully, Dex has a softer side and is grateful for Finley's kindness towards him.
- Captain Parker (voiced by Justin Fletcher in the UK and Dean Smith in the US) is a senior male fire engine and Finley's older brother, who always keeps the gang in check. He is based on 1951 Mack fire truck.
- DJ (voiced by Janet James in the UK and Maggie Blue O'Hara in the US) is a female orange front end loader who enjoys nothing better than digging. It reveals in "Lights Out" that she sometimes sucks her scooper when she goes to sleep.
- Jesse (voiced by Chantal Strand in the US) is a yellow-and-pink female tow truck with a siren shaped like a bow and a red nose. She is usually timid and shy, but is always ready and raring to come to the rescue.
- Isabelle (voiced by Andrea Libman in the US) is a green-and-purple ice cream van girl who is very polite, bubbly, lovable and girly.
- Abigail (voiced by Janet James in the UK and Teryl Rothery in the US) is a white female ambulance who is kind, gentle, and sweet.
- Miguel (voiced by Matt Hill in the US) is a silver male mail truck who is very professional and organized. In "Lights Out", it is revealed that he sleeps with his parking lights on.
- Gorby (voiced by Lee Tockar in the US) is a green male recycling truck who is Finley's best friend. He can be a bit cheeky and goofy however, he is hardworking, reliable, and dutiful.
- Scooty (voiced by Danny McKinnon in the US) is a yellow male school bus and Miguel's best friend who can get a bit nervous.
- Hubert (voiced by David Paul Grove in the US) is a blue-and-white male police car who solves mysteries. Quinton Flynn voices him.
- Scout is a male Dalmatian who is both Finley's best friend and also the latter and Captain Parker's pet Dalmatian with a few blue spots on his white fur.

=== Recurring ===
- Carl (voiced by Dean Smith in the US) is a blue male lorry.
- Suds (voiced by Jay Simon in the UK and Michael Dobson in the US) is a purple-and-pink male talking car wash.
- Mr. Bell (voiced by Lee Tockar in the US) is a male yellow talking fire station bell who usually spends the day sleeping, although one time he couldn't do so, until he could finally get to sleep as Abigail squirts oil onto him.
- Lyle and Lois (voiced by Michael Dobson and Kathleen Barr in the US) are talking fuel pumps. Lyle is male and blue, while Lois is female and orange.
- Polly (voiced by Kathleen Barr in the US) is a silver female talking fireman's pole.
