= The Sacrifice Game =

2023 horror film by Jenn Wexler

- Promotional release poster
- Directed by: Jenn Wexler
- Written by: Sean Redlitz; Jenn Wexler
- Produced by: Philip Kalin-Hajdu; Albert I. Melamed; Todd Slater; Jenn Wexler; Heather Buckley
- Starring: Mena Massoud; Olivia Scott Welch; Gus Kenworthy; Madison Baines; Derek Johns; Laurent Pitre; Chloë Levine; Georgia Acken
- Cinematography: Alexandre Bussière
- Edited by: Mathieu Bérubé; Arthur Tarnowski
- Music by: Mario Sévigny
- Production companies: Convoke Media; Real by Fake; Red Sea Media
- Distributed by: Shudder; Red Sea Media, Inc.
- Release date: July 28, 2023 (Fantasia)
- Running time: 99 minutes
- Country: United States

The Sacrifice Game is a 2023 American horror film directed by Jenn Wexler, who also co-wrote the film with Sean Redlitz. It stars Mena Massoud, Olivia Scott Welch, and Gus Kenworthy.

The Sacrifice Game premiered at the Fantasia International Film Festival on July 28, 2023, and was released on the streaming service Shudder on December 8, 2023.

== Plot ==
At Blackvale Academy, an all-girls boarding school, two students, Clara and Samantha, have stayed behind for Christmas with their teacher Rose and her boyfriend Jimmy. A group of murderers, Jude, Maisie, Grant, and Doug, have been terrorizing the nearby towns with a series of ritualistic murders based on a demon summoning ritual Maisie discovered while attending Blackvale. A chance encounter with a police officer forces the killers to take refuge in Blackvale, where they quickly capture and restrain Rose and the others, killing Jimmy in the process. They decide to finish the ritual at Blackwood by slaughtering Rose, only to grow frustrated when the promised demon doesn't show itself.

Maisie goes to the basement with Jude to investigate the spellbook where she obtained the spell, in the process discovering that she had only obtained part of the ritual and that the final sacrifice must be someone unpure. Doug goes after them, leaving Clara and Samantha alone with Grant. Jude wanders off after acting strangely. As Maisie reads the spell, she realizes that the ritual is intended to free a demon, Clara. Clara is then shown using her powers on Grant and compels him to free Samantha, whom she instructs to leave her behind and flee for safety. The demon then uses her powers to mentally overtake Grant, using him to capture and render Jude, Maisie, and Doug unconscious. Samantha manages to flee to a security station and call the police, but chooses to return in order to save Clara.

Maisie awakens to discover that Clara has imprisoned them without their clothes in order to complete the ritual. Clara reveals that she was imprisoned within the school walls centuries earlier after the townspeople changed their minds while summoning her. Clara forces them to make various personal sacrifices, culminating in the deaths of Doug and Jude. Maisie manages to break Clara's control over Grant, who kills himself. Samantha returns and discovers that Clara is the demon, further breaking Clara's control and freeing Maisie - who begins fleeing - wearing only her underwear. Upset, Clara demands to know why Samantha returned; she responds that she couldn't leave a friend behind. The two argue, as Clara refuses to believe that anyone could care about her. She asks that Samantha free her by killing Maisie as she escapes into the snow. Samantha complies and the film ends with her and Clara leaving to travel the world together.

== Cast ==
- Mena Massoud as Jude
- Olivia Scott Welch as Maisie
- Gus Kenworthy as Jimmy
- Madison Baines as Samantha
- Derek Johns as Grant
- Laurent Pitre as Doug
- Chloë Levine as Rose
- Georgia Acken as Clara
- Kathleen Fee as the Headmistress

== Production ==
The Sacrifice Game was filmed in Oka, Quebec, Canada.

== Reception ==
On the review aggregator website Rotten Tomatoes, The Sacrifice Game has an approval rating of 90% based on twenty-nine reviews, with an average rating of 7.1/10. On Metacritic it has a rating of 55.

Meagan Navarro of Bloody Disgusting gave the film a score of three-and-a-half out of five, and wrote that "Its narrative turns, characters that challenge perceptions, and slasher-like bloodletting yield a devilishly fun new entry in holiday horror." Nick Allen of RogerEbert.com wrote that the film's screenplay "proves strongest when it can be as bonkers as it likes and let a few of its characters take over with pure dramatic force. The film's best parts are saved for a must-not-be-spoiled twist later in the story, when it gets past some stiff line-reading and clunky backstory revealing."

== See also ==
- Christmas horror
