= Evolving Vegan =

Food travel television series

Evolving Vegan is a Canadian food travelogue television series, which premiered in 2023 on CTV Life. Hosted by actor Mena Massoud and based in part on his own previously published vegan cookbook of the same name, the series features Massoud travelling to various cities to meet with vegan chefs who are building reputations as leaders and innovators in vegan cuisine.

The series premiered on March 30, 2023, with a second season slated to air beginning in April 2024.

Massoud received a Canadian Screen Award nomination for Best Host in a Lifestyle Program or Series at the 12th Canadian Screen Awards in 2024.

== See also ==
- List of vegan and plant-based media
