= The Royal Treatment (film) =

2022 American film by Rick Jacobson

- Official poster
- Directed by: Rick Jacobson
- Written by: Holly Hester
- Produced by: Ellen Marano; Laura Marano; Chloe Smith
- Starring: Laura Marano; Mena Massoud
- Cinematography: John Cavill
- Edited by: Luke Haigh
- Music by: John R. Graham
- Production company: Calabrian Rhode Productions
- Distributed by: Netflix
- Release date: January 20, 2022
- Running time: 97 minutes
- Country: United States
- Language: English

The Royal Treatment is a 2022 American romance film directed by Rick Jacobson and written by Holly Hester. It stars Laura Marano and Mena Massoud. With the exception of these two, Jay Simon and Paul Norell, the majority of the cast is from New Zealand which is where the movie was filmed.

Manhattan hairdresser Izzy is given an opportunity to work at the wedding of Prince Thomas, where sparks inadvertently fly between them, so he must choose between duty and love.

After its release on January 20, 2022, on Netflix, The Royal Treatment became the week's most-watched film on the streaming service. However, it received negative reviews from critics.

== Plot ==
Isabella, a.k.a Izzy, is a Manhattan hairdresser. One day, the microwave in her salon causes a fire. The assistant of the salon's landlord Doug insists Izzy pay for the damage caused, so she gives the money she had saved for traveling the world.

The prince of Lavania, Prince Thomas, asks his assistant Walter to schedule a haircut on his NYC visit. Walter mistakenly calls up Izzy's salon, telling her that she will be paid $500 for the haircut. Izzy agrees. When she meets the prince and starts cutting his hair, a housekeeper comes with tea and accidentally drops it.

Izzy is upset at how badly the housekeeper is treated, so leaves without finishing the Prince's haircut. She returns to the salon, where Thomas comes in to finish the haircut. Afterward, Izzy agrees to walk the prince back to the metro and they share a fun night.

The next day Thomas, his fiancée Lauren, and her mother discuss who to hire as the makeup artists for the wedding. Walter recommends Izzy's salon. Lauren and her mother agree, so Izzy and her friends travel to Lavania. They will get $50,000 as payment for the royal wedding.

An assistant at the castle, Madam Fabre, tests their makeup skills. Izzy passes by transforming a man-servant but her coworkers do not, so Madam Fabre trains them. Izzy goes to see the province and Thomas accompanies her. They have fun at the Uber de Glares, which is considered by the royals to be a 'dangerous' part of town.

The next day, Thomas states to his family that he wants to do more for the commoners. Izzy encourages the locals to donate to the less fortunate children by leaving donated items at the castle gate. Lauren tells Thomas that she wants part of their new estate to be for her work studio. Thomas finds the guard house full of donated toys for the children, so he also decides to donate some royal furniture that the queen threw out. Izzy and Thomas drive the toys and some royal furniture to the orphanage.

Lauren's mother Ruth observes that Thomas and Izzy are getting too close. Lauren is unconcerned, commenting that she would rather focus on her business ideas than marry someone she barely knows. When Ruth leaks a photo of them ends up in the papers, Izzy is asked to leave. It is revealed that the reason why the King and Queen want Thomas to marry Lauren is because her family could help them get out of debt.

On the wedding day, Walter tells Thomas that he knows he is in love with Izzy. Thomas then tells Lauren he cannot marry her. She is relieved as she does not want to get married either. Izzy returns to NYC find that there was a major fire in the salon.

When Doug visits asking for money, Izzy tells him that she has spoken with the owner, who had expected Doug to rewire the property last year. The family makes plans to refurbish the salon but Izzy tells them she does not want to work at the salon anymore, instead choosing to be director of a local community center.

As Izzy gazes at the street from her apartment's fire escape, she hears horse hooves. Prince Thomas rides to Izzy's house on horseback and confesses his feelings for her and they kiss. The movie ends with them going to get gelato on horseback.

== Cast ==
- Laura Marano as Isabella "Izzy"
- Mena Massoud as Prince Thomas
- Chelsie Preston-Crayford as Destiny
- Grace Bentley-Tsibuah as Lola
- Cameron Rhodes as Walter
- Jay Simon as Doug
- Sonia Gray as Madame Fabre
- Elizabeth Hawthorne as Nonna
- Amanda Billing as Valentina
- James Gaylyn as Nate
- Paul Norell as King John
- Teuila Blakely as Queen Catherine
- Jacque Drew as Ruth LaMott
- Phoenix Connolly as Lauren LaMott
- Matthew E. Morgan as Buddy LaMott
- Taylor Barrett as Francis

== Production ==
The film was originally to start production in Europe in early 2020, but was delayed due to the COVID-19 pandemic. Filming later began in both Dunedin and Oamaru in New Zealand in February 2021. Film production involved 30 actors, 100 extras, and a sizeable film crew. Notable film locations included Vogel Street (which stood in for New York City), Fable Dunedin Hotel, Larnach Castle, and Olveston Historic Home (the latter two of which stood in for the Lavania royal palace), the Otago Peninsula, the University of Otago Registry Building, and Oamaru's Victorian precinct.

The film was released on January 20, 2022, on Netflix. It reached the number 1 spot on Netflix the week of its release.

== Reception ==
On the review aggregator website Rotten Tomatoes, 35% of 17 critics' reviews are positive, with an average rating of 4.20/10. Metacritic, which uses a weighted average, assigned the film a score of 36 out of 100, based on 5 critics, indicating "generally unfavorable" reviews.

Courtney Howard of Variety gave the film a positive review and wrote that it "takes expected genre trappings and infuses them with unexpected delights, creating an enlightened, enchanting and entertaining feature."

Lindsey Bahr of the Associated Press awarded the film one and a half stars out of four and wrote, "Like a drug store chocolate bar, it just is. It might not be good for you, but it’ll go down shockingly easy, give you a minor sugar high (and possible headache) and disappear from your memory just as quickly..."

James Croot of Stuff described the film as a "flimsy, forgettable rom-com farce." He also criticised Holly Hester's script, likening it to an early treatment rather than a "fully formed" screenplay. Croot described Marano's character Izzy as one-dimensional and noted the New Zealand accents of the non-royal Lavanian characters.
