= The Siege (TV series) =

- Genre: Historical drama
- Based on: The Siege by Ben MacIntyre
- Screenplay by: Will Smith
- Directed by: Lewis Arnold
- Starring: David Morrissey; Danny Dyer; Motaz Malhees; Alex Jennings; Omid Djalili; Alexej Manvelov
- Country of origin: United Kingdom
- Original language: English
- No. of series: 1
- No. of episodes: 6

Production
- Producer: Richard Stokes
- Running time: 46 minutes
- Production companies: AC Chapter One; Universal International Studios; ARTE France

Original release
- Network: Channel 4

The Siege is an upcoming British television series for Channel 4, adapted by Will Smith from the Ben MacIntyre book of the same name about the Iranian Embassy siege of 1980 in London.

== Cast ==
- David Morrissey
- Danny Dyer
- Motaz Malhees
- Alex Jennings
- Omid Djalili
- Alexej Manvelov
- Sara Shirpey
- Sam Troughton
- Asim Chaudhry
- Aneurin Barnard
- Mark Bonnar
- Gwilym Lee
- Leo Bill
- Kevin Doyle
- Nicola Stephenson
- Stephen Campbell Moore
- Sean Pertwee
- Enzo Cilenti
- Moe Bar-El
- Kavé Niku
- Nina Mahdavi
- Catayoune Ahmadi
- Armin Karima
- Iddo Goldberg
- Lorne MacFadyen
- Rami Nasr

== Production ==
Will Smith adapted the Ben MacIntyre book The Siege (2024) for the series. It is produced AC Chapter One with Universal International Studios and co-produced by ARTE France. Directed by Lewis Arnold, the series producer is Richard Stokes.

The cast is led by David Morrissey, Danny Dyer and Motaz Malhees with Alex Jennings Alexej Manvelov, Sara Shirpey, Sam Troughton, Asim Chaudhry, Aneurin Barnard, Mark Bonnar, Gwilym Lee and Omid Djalili, as well as Leo Bill, Kevin Doyle, Nicola Stephenson, Stephen Campbell Moore, Sean Pertwee and Enzo Cilenti, Moe Bar-El, Kavé Niku, Nina Mahdavi, Catayoune Ahmadi, Armin Karima, Iddo Goldberg, Lorne MacFadyen.

Filming took place in Hove, East Sussex, in May 2026 with filming locations including Palmeira Square.
