= Jack Ryan (TV series) =

American television series (2018–2023)

- Promotional poster for the first season
- Also known as: Tom Clancy's; Jack Ryan
- Genre: Action; Drama; Political thriller; Spy thriller
- Created by: Carlton Cuse; Graham Roland
- Based on: Characters by Tom Clancy
- Starring: John Krasinski; Wendell Pierce; Abbie Cornish; Ali Suliman; Dina Shihabi; John Hoogenakker; Noomi Rapace; Jordi Mollà; Francisco Denis; Cristina Umaña; Jovan Adepo; Michael Kelly; Betty Gabriel; James Cosmo; Peter Guinness; Nina Hoss; Alexej Manvelov; Michael Peña; Okieriete Onaodowan; Louis Ozawa Changchien; Zuleikha Robinson
- Composer: Ramin Djawadi
- Country of origin: United States
- Original language: English
- No. of seasons: 4
- No. of episodes: 30

Production
- Executive producers: Carlton Cuse; Graham Roland; Daniel Sackheim; Morten Tyldum; Michael Bay; Brad Fuller; Andrew Form; John Krasinski; Tom Clancy; David Ellison; Dana Goldberg; Bill Bost; Marcy Ross; Mace Neufeld (Note: Mace Neufeld let the production use his name and was credited as an executive producer but was not involved in the series. Neufeld was posthumously credited in the third and fourth seasons.)
- Producers: Nazrin Choudhury; José Luis Ecolar; Robert Phillips
- Cinematography: Richard Rutkowski; Checco Varese; Christopher Faloona
- Editors: John M. Valerio; Paul Trejo; Sarah Boyd; Vikash Patel
- Camera setup: Single-camera
- Running time: 40–64 minutes
- Production companies: Genre Arts; Push, Boot. (seasons 1–2); Platinum Dunes; Skydance Television; Paramount Television Studios; Amazon Studios; Sunday Night Productions

Original release
- Network: Amazon Prime Video
- Release: August 31, 2018 – July 14, 2023

Tom Clancy's Jack Ryan (also known simply as Jack Ryan) is an American political action thriller television series based on characters from the fictional Ryanverse created by author Tom Clancy. Featuring modern-day interpretations of the original characters, it stars John Krasinski as CIA analyst Jack Ryan. The series was created by Carlton Cuse and Graham Roland. Cuse, Roland, and Krasinski serve as executive producers, alongside Michael Bay, Morten Tyldum, and Brad Fuller, among others.

The series premiered on August 31, 2018, on Amazon Prime Video. Ahead of the third season, Amazon renewed the series for a fourth season and in May 2022, it was confirmed the series would end after its fourth season, which premiered on June 29, 2023, and concluded on July 14. A spin-off starring Michael Peña as Ding Chavez and a sequel film were in development, although the former was cancelled and did not materialize. The film, titled Jack Ryan: Ghost War, was confirmed to be in production on February 19, 2025 and released in May 2026 on Prime Video.

== Premise ==
The first season follows the titular CIA analyst as he is wrenched from the security of his desk job into the field after discovering a string of dubious bank transfers, which are being carried out by a rising Islamic extremist named Suleiman.

The second season sees Jack in the middle of political warfare in a corrupt Venezuela.

In the third season, Jack investigates a plot to re-create the former Soviet Union by detonating an untraceable tactical nuclear bomb in the Czech Republic.

In the fourth season, Jack, now the CIA's acting deputy director, faces his most dangerous mission yet, which involves a foe operating both in the United States and further afield. The trouble begins after he begins investigating rumours of internal corruption, during which he and his trusted associates uncover evidence of an alliance between a drug cartel and a terrorist organization.

== Cast and characters ==
=== Main ===
- John Krasinski as Jack Ryan, a former U.S. Marine officer and Afghanistan veteran working as a financial analyst for the Central Intelligence Agency (CIA), specifically the Terror Finance and Arms Division (T-FAD) under the Counterterrorism Center (CTC); later promoted to head of T-FAD. In season 3, Jack is working in the field as a CIA operations officer. Krasinski's interpretation of the character is said to be inspired by Harrison Ford's portrayal in Patriot Games and Clear and Present Danger. Director and executive producer Daniel Sackheim said: "What was so great about the Harrison Ford movies was that they were about an everyman hero. He was a guy who wasn't a superhero. He was heroic, but he was vulnerable. He wasn't afraid to be scared. He was a regular man and a hero."
- Wendell Pierce as James Greer, Ryan's boss in T-FAD, a non-practising Muslim and former CIA station chief in Karachi; by season 2 he had been promoted to deputy station chief in Moscow, and then reassigned to Venezuela by request. In season 4, Greer becomes CIA deputy director upon Jack's resignation from the post.
- Abbie Cornish as Dr. Cathy Mueller (seasons 1 and 4), Ryan's love interest, a physician specializing in infectious diseases and spokesperson for the World Health Organization.
- Ali Suliman as Mousa bin Suleiman (season 1), a Lebanese-born French Islamic terrorist skilled in finance who is radicalized after graduating from Dauphine and seeks to establish a unified Islamic caliphate against the West with his brother Ali. Although he graduated top of his class and a financial analytic talent, nobody saw his potential and ended up as a falafel cook. After being harassed by the French police, he distracted them to save his brother from jail. It was while being jailed that Mousa was radicalized by extremists within prison.
- Dina Shihabi as Hanin Ali (season 1), Suleiman's wife.
- John Hoogenakker as Matice (aka "Garth" and "Geoff", season 2, recurring season 1), a leading black ops operative with the CIA Special Activities Center
- Noomi Rapace as Harriet "Harry" Baumann (season 2), a German Federal Intelligence Service (BND) agent tracking her former associate Max Schenkel in Venezuela.
- Jordi Mollà as Nicolás Reyes (season 2), president of Venezuela.
- Francisco Denis as Miguel Ubarri (season 2), President Reyes's chief advisor and childhood friend, a concerned general.
- Cristina Umaña as Gloria Bonalde (season 2), the major contender in the upcoming Venezuelan presidential election and wife of the missing Minister of Interior and Justice.
- Jovan Adepo as Marcus Bishop (season 2), a retired U.S. Navy special crewman now fixing boats, reluctantly recruited back into action with call sign "Uber (Select)".
- Michael Kelly as Mike November (seasons 2–4), CIA station chief in Venezuela, he left the Agency after season 2 and became a private contractor.
- Betty Gabriel as Elizabeth Wright (seasons 3–4), CIA station chief in Rome, and Jack's superior; later promoted to CIA director.
- James Cosmo as Luka Goncharov (season 3).
- Peter Guinness as Petr Kovac (season 3).
- Nina Hoss as Alena Kovac (season 3), president of the Czech Republic.
- Alexej Manvelov as Alexei Petrov (season 3), Minister of Defense of the Russian Federation.
- Michael Peña as Domingo Chavez, a former Navy SEAL and a senior CIA operative in SAC/SOG (season 4).
- Okieriete Onaodowan as Adebayo 'Ade' Osoji (season 4).
- Louis Ozawa Changchien as Chao Fah Sien (season 4), chief of operations of the Silver Lotus Triad.
- Zuleikha Robinson as Zeyara Lemos (season 4).

=== Recurring ===
- Karim Zein as Samir (season 1), Suleiman and Hanin's son.
- Nadia Affolter as Sara (season 1), Suleiman and Hanin's elder daughter.
- Arpy Ayvazian as Rama (season 1), Suleiman and Hanin's younger daughter.
- Haaz Sleiman as Ali bin Suleiman (season 1), Suleiman's younger brother.
- Amir El-Masry as Ibrahim (season 1), the most trusted member of Suleiman's sect.
- Goran Kostić as Ansore Dudayev (season 1).
- Timothy Hutton as Nathan Singer (season 1), CIA Deputy Director of Operations.
- Adam Bernett as Patrick Klinghoffer (season 1 & 4), Ryan's colleague in T-FAD.
- Eileen Li as Noreen Yang (season 1), Ryan's colleague.
- Mena Massoud as Tarek Kassar (season 1), Ryan's colleague.
- Zarif Kabier as Jabir (season 1).
- Kamel Labroudi as Yazid (season 1).
- Shadi Janho as Amer (season 1).
- Victoria Sanchez as Layla Navarro (season 1 & 4), Ryan's colleague.
- Matt McCoy as Dr. Daniel Nadler (season 1), leader of the contingent of hostage physicians from Doctors Without Borders
- Marie-Josée Croze as Sandrine Arnaud (season 1), a French intelligence officer.
- John Magaro as 1st Lt Victor Polizzi (season 1), a U.S. Air Force MQ-9 Reaper sensor operator.
- Daniel Kash as Shelby Farnsworth (season 1), CIA Director of Operations.
- Jameel Khoury as Colonel Al Radwan (season 1).
- Kenny Wong as Danny (season 1), Singer's aide.
- Emmanuelle Lussier-Martinez as Teresa (season 1), Ryan's colleague.
- Al Sapienza as Lt. Gen. Marcus Trent (season 1), Secretary of Defense.
- Chadi Alhelou as Fathi (season 1), Hanin's uncle.
- Stephane Krau as Lt. Bruno Cluzet (season 1).
- Susan Misner as US Ambassador to Venezuela Lisa Calabrese (season 2).
- Tom Wlaschiha as Max Schenkel (season 2), a contract killer, former German special forces and BND officer.
- Allan Hawco as Coyote (season 2).
- Arnold Vosloo as Jost Van Der Byl (season 2), a South African arms trafficker.
- David Norona as José Marzan (season 2), the head of security at the U.S. Embassy in Venezuela.
- Mikhail Safronov as Surikov (season 3), President of Russia.
- Adam Vacula as Radek Breza (season 3), President Kovac's bodyguard.
- Anton Pampushnyy as Konstantin Vyatkin (season 3), GRU agent.
- John Schwab as CIA Director Thomas Miller (seasons 3–4)
- David Bedella as U.S. President Charles Bachler (season 3–4)
- Derek Cecil as Senator Henshaw (season 4)
- Michael McElhatton as Bill Tuttle (season 4)

=== Guest ===
- Victor Slezak as Joe Mueller, Cathy's father (season 1)
- Jenny Raven as Dr. Yen (season 1).
- Cynthia Preston as Blanche Dubois (season 1).
- Lee Tergesen as Stanley Kowalski (season 1).
- Yani Marin as Ava Garcia (season 1), Victor's drone pilot partner.
- Jonathan Bailey as Lance Miller (season 1).
- Natalie Brown as Rebecca (season 1).
- Blair Brown as Sue Joyce (season 1), Director of the CIA.
- Ron Canada as Bobby Vig (season 1), Director of National Intelligence.
- Michael Gaston as U.S. President Andrew Pickett (season 1).
- Julianne Jain as Marabel (season 1).
- Youness Benzakour as Ismail Ahmadi (season 1).
- John Robinson as Buster (season 1).
- Numan Acar as Tony (seasons 1, 3).
- Conrad Coates as Colonel Robert Phelps (season 1).
- Karen LeBlanc as Kalie Horn (season 1).
- Jonathan Potts as Dr. Roger Wade (season 1).
- Benito Martinez as Senator Jim Moreno (season 2).
- Frank Whaley as Carter Estes (season 2).
- William Jackson Harper as Xander (season 2), a CIA computer specialist.

== Episodes ==
Season	Episodes	Originally released	
Season	Episodes	First released	Last released
1	8	August 31, 2018	
2	8	October 31, 2019	
3	8	December 21, 2022	
4	6	June 30, 2023	July 14, 2023

=== Season 1 (2018) ===
No. overall	No. in season	Title	Directed by	Written by	Original release date
1	1	"Pilot"	Morten Tyldum	Story by : Carlton Cuse & Graham Roland; Teleplay by : Graham Roland	August 31, 2018
Low-level CIA financial analyst Jack Ryan comes to believe that $9 million of unusual financial transactions are connected to a new Yemeni terrorist named Suleiman. Jack meets medical doctor Cathy Mueller at a social function before he is collected by helicopter and then taken via a plane to Yemen by James Greer, his new boss in the Terror, Finance, and Arms Division (T-FAD) of the CIA. The man seemingly responsible for the payments and his assumed bodyguard are being interrogated when the American base is attacked by rebels/militia. The attackers then rescue the bodyguard, who an injured Jack then realizes is really Suleiman.
2	2	"French Connection"	Daniel Sackheim	Carlton Cuse & Graham Roland	August 31, 2018
Jack reconnects with Cathy, and Suleiman's wife Hanin is concerned about the armed terrorists he has brought to their home. Jack and Greer figure out that their target is Mousa Bin Suleiman, a French national. His phone records lead them to an apartment outside of Paris, where Suleiman's brother Ali is transferring funds. Jack and Greer accompany French intelligence in their raid, but an injured Ali manages to escape in the middle of the ensuing shootout, which ends in French police officers shooting a woman wearing a bomb vest while she pleads for help, causing an explosion.
3	3	"Black 22"	Patricia Riggen	Carlton Cuse & Graham Roland	August 31, 2018
In pursuit of Ali, Jack and Greer learn that he is traveling to a rendezvous point in southern France. Hanin escapes with her daughters, but Suleiman sends men after her. One kills the other and attempts to rape Hanin. Meanwhile, Victor, an American drone pilot based in Las Vegas, struggles with his conscience; he later saves Hanin from her attacker with an unauthorized drone strike.
4	4	"The Wolf"	Daniel Sackheim	Carlton Cuse & Graham Roland	August 31, 2018
Suleiman starts an insurrection within ISIS and imprisons its leader, consolidating control of the organization and taking control of 12 hostage physicians from Doctors Without Borders. Jack and French intelligence officer Sandrine Arnaud track Ali to a remote gas station; Sandrine is killed in a shootout with Ali, whom Jack shoots and kills in self-defense. Meanwhile, Suleiman's terrorist cell in Paris stages a sarin gas attack on the funeral of a well-known French priest.
5	5	"End of Honor"	Patricia Riggen	Story by : Stephen Kronish; Teleplay by : Stephen Kronish & Daria Polatin	August 31, 2018
Hanin requests political asylum for herself and her daughters in a refugee camp in Turkey, naming Suleiman as her husband and attracting the attention of the CIA. In the aftermath of the Paris church attack, Jack manages to make contact with Suleiman using the messaging board on a video game, posing as Ali. Suleiman detects the ruse, but Jack confirms that Hanin has indeed left her husband, and tells Suleiman that Ali is dead. Jack and Greer proceed to Turkey to extract Hanin and the girls, but she has paid someone to smuggle them from the camp to the coast.
6	6	"Sources and Methods"	Carlton Cuse	Story by : Patrick Aison; Teleplay by : Patrick Aison & Annie Jacobsen	August 31, 2018
Jack and Greer, with aid from a Turkish sex trafficker, track Hanin and her daughters to the Turkish coast, where Suleiman's henchman is also in pursuit of the women. Greer reveals that he was PNG'd from Karachi because he had killed his asset, a Pakistani army officer, who was going to turn him in to the authorities to be tortured and killed. Meanwhile, Victor learns that one of his "terrorist" targets had been misidentified and travels to Syria to make amends with the family. Cathy investigates a man infected with a strain of the Ebola virus thought eradicated. It is revealed that six months before in Liberia, Suleiman and Ali had dug up the body of a person who died from the same strain.
7	7	"The Boy"	Patricia Riggen	Nazrin Choudhury & Nolan Dunbar	August 31, 2018
Cathy is questioned about her Ebola report and is furious to discover that Jack works for the CIA. Meanwhile, CIA officials debate on whether to capture Suleiman or kill him in an airstrike. Jack and Greer try to convince their superiors to settle on a covert ground assault to do the former, as well as extracting Hanin's son, Samir. The CIA has learned about the hostage doctors, and US President Pickett approves the mission. JSOC forces storm the compound but find no sign of Suleiman; instead, they locate and rescue the physicians. As one of them, Dr. Daniel Nadler, is welcomed by his longtime friend Pickett, Jack and Greer realize that the doctors have been intentionally infected with the Ebola virus.
8	8	"Inshallah"	Daniel Sackheim	Carlton Cuse & Graham Roland	August 31, 2018
Pickett, as well as other high-ranking government officials, are quarantined for exposure to Ebola. Suleiman arrives in the country with Samir to carry out another attack, this time a release of cesium into the ventilation system of Washington Memorial Hospital, intending to kill Pickett and throw the United States into chaos. Jack and Greer warn the Secret Service, and Jack chases Suleiman to a nearby train station and kills him before he can activate the device remotely. Jack and Greer later return Samir to Hanin. For stopping the terrorist attack, Greer is promoted to deputy station chief in Moscow, and Jack replaces him as head of T-FAD.

=== Season 2 (2019) ===
No. overall	No. in season	Title	Directed by	Written by	Original release date
9	1	"Cargo"	Phil Abraham	Carlton Cuse & Graham Roland	October 31, 2019
Jack Ryan searches for the truth behind Venezuela's transactions with various World Powers. James Greer finds out about a satellite that launched from a contact in Moscow. Greer suffers from a heart condition and is threatened to be restricted to a desk. Greer requests a change of station to Venezuela so he can follow the boat the satellite was launched from. Meanwhile Jack and Senator Jamie Moreno meet with President Nicolas Reyes in Venezuela to discuss what the U.S. believes to be a shipment of nuclear weapons that is being hidden in the jungle of Venezuela. The president denies all involvement. An assassin named Max Schenkel is hired to take out Jack and Senator Moreno. Greer meets with Ryan and Senator Moreno and Greer reveals that the ship he is investigating is also the one Ryan believes to have shipped nuclear weapons. Ryan sleeps with a woman who bugs his room and is revealed to be a German spy. The next day when Ryan and Moreno are scheduled to fly home, the security team with them diverts from the direct course. The American convoy is ambushed and Moreno is assassinated by Max but police arrive before Ryan can be harmed. The head of the security detail that was paid off returns home to find his family murdered and he escapes a would be assassin when his dog saves his life. The episode ends with Jack calling Senator Moreno's wife and trying to tell her of his death.
10	2	"Tertia Optio"	Phil Abraham	Vince Calandra & Daria Polatin	October 31, 2019
Jack is granted permission from Senator Chapin to stay in Venezuela. The head of security shows up to the American Embassy and is interrogated by Ryan, Greer, and Mike November the Station Chief in Venezuela. He reveals he was paid money by someone to change the course of the security detail. President Reyes denies involvement in the events that are keeping Jack in country. Meanwhile, Jack and Harriet team up to follow a lead that could create dissension within the ranks.
11	3	"Orinoco"	Andrew Bernstein	David Graziano & Annie Jacobsen	October 31, 2019
The U.S. Special Activities team lands in Venezuela where Jack's intel leads them to a militia guarded compound. Deep in the jungle, Jack's search for answers puts the whole team in danger. President Reyes's opponent, Gloria Bonalde, proves to be a real contender in the upcoming election.
12	4	"Dressed to Kill"	Andrew Bernstein	Graham Roland & Nolan Dunbar	October 31, 2019
Relieved of duty in Venezuela, Jack follows a new trail to London and seeks the help of MI5, only to discover the man he's after is also after him. Meanwhile, Reyes visits Gloria Bonalde and offers her to become the Minister of the Interior and Justice, as well as his successor in the next presidential election in six years, but in return Gloria must withdraw her candidacy from the elections this year. Ryan, with the help of MI-5 and German intelligence agent Harry Baumann, arranges an ambush to capture Max Schenkel, but the trap does not work and Jack has to chase Max across the rooftops of London, who manages to escape. In the last scene, Schenkel looks through the recordings from his camera, on which he sees the face of Ryan, as well as his former colleague and lover Harry.
13	5	"Blue Gold"	Dennie Gordon	Vince Calandra & Annie Jacobsen	October 31, 2019
Using Max's daughter as bait, Jack and Harry convince Max to meet face to face. At the meeting, Harry kills Max with a gunshot to the head. Stranded in the jungle, Marcus stumbles across a prisoner camp. Greer visits Gloria hoping to draw a connection between Reyes and her missing husband.
14	6	"Persona Non Grata"	Dennie Gordon	David Graziano & Daria Polatin	October 31, 2019
Jack returns to Venezuela. Jack and Greer go to Monica Herrera’s office to investigate but are arrested by Reyes soldiers. They are taken to Reyes’s country mansion. Jack confronts Reyes with information on Max Schenkel and Senator Moreno. Reyes's soldiers pursue Matice and the American soldiers through the jungle. They are ambushed but are rescued by Marcus. Matice stays behind to give the other three time to escape but he is later killed by the soldiers. Reyes accuses the U.S. of tampering with the election and orders the U.S. Embassy to be closed and everyone to leave the country. Riots break out in front of the embassy as the ambassador and the staff are evacuated. Jack, Greer and Mike November decide not to follow orders and stay behind. They escape the embassy in two cars but Greer is betrayed and captured by Reyes's men.
15	7	"Dios y Federacion"	Dennie Gordon	Graham Roland & Carlton Cuse	October 31, 2019
Greer is taken to the jungle prison camp and interrogated. After Mike takes revenge on Marzan who betrayed Greer, he and Jack set out to rescue Greer. Jack and the three American soldiers hires Jost Van Der Byl, a South African arms trafficker, to help rescue Greer. They capture the camp and stop the executions of Reyes enemies who were imprisoned there but Greer was already taken to the Presidential Palace in Caracas. Reyes announces the election in Venezuela is moved up, citing the fear of tampering by the Americans. Miguel Ubarri, Reyes’ chief advisor and childhood friend tells his wife that they have to escape and go to the Americans. After giving a speech to his supporters, Reyes murders Ubarri. Greer remains imprisoned in the palace.
16	8	"Strongman"	Andrew Bernstein	Carlton Cuse & Graham Roland	October 31, 2019
The presidential election is underway while in the jungle camp Jack is filming the executed victims and the rescued survivors. Jack uploads the video to news agencies around the world. As the videos are being shown on television news shows, Reyes orders the polls to be shut down and declares himself the winner. When the polls are shut down, violent protests erupt outside the Presidential Palace. Jack, Mike and the three American soldiers fly to the Presidential Palace to rescue Greer. A firefight breaks out inside the palace. Greer escapes his prison. The rioters break into the palace as Jack, Greer, Mike and the three soldiers fly out of Venezuela. The Venezuelan election commission declares Gloria Bonalde the winner and the new president.

=== Season 3 (2022) ===
No. overall	No. in season	Title	Directed by	Written by	Original release date
17	1	"Falcon"	Jann Turner	Vaun Wilmott	December 21, 2022
In 1969, a secret project to develop a nuclear weapon, Sokol, is deactivated. Under the orders of Luka Gocharov, a Soviet officer, all of the project scientists are killed. In the present, Jack Ryan learns that Sokol has been reactivated, and is informed that a 3-megaton nuclear weapon may have already been developed. He receives a tip from an asset, Zoya Ivanova. With this, Jack predicts that Sokol is part of an older Soviet war plan to sow confusion in western Europe, culminating in the detonation of a nuclear weapon. Jack is sent the location of a cargo ship, and organizes a team to retrieve what he suspects is the weapon. After leading a team to the ship, he discovers that the payload is a Sokol project scientist, Yuri, who is trying to defect from Russia. The team drops Jack and Yuri off at a rally point on a beach in Greece, but they are quickly ambushed. Much of the extraction team is killed, and Jack and Yuri flee to Athens. Jack and Yuri evade their pursuers, led by a Russian spy, Konstantin, but Yuri is killed. Jack escapes and calls Greer and Elizabeth Wright, the Rome station chief. They inform Jack that the investigation into Sokol is being terminated, and that he is to return to Rome, as he is wanted for accidentally killing a Greek police officer. Jack decides to flee and destroys his phone. In Prague, Czech president, Alena Kovac, prepares to meet with Popov, the Russian Defense Minister. During a publicity event at a soccer game between the Russian and Czech teams, Popov is shot and killed.
18	2	"Old Haunts"	Jann Turner	Amy Berg	December 21, 2022
In 1969, Luka collects possessions of the slain project scientists and returns them to their families. While doing this, he discovers one of the scientists did not go to work that day, and has survived. In present day, Greer surreptitiously sends money to Jack. Jack has an encounter with Konstantin and flees. Greer and Elizabeth arrive in Athens to look for Jack. Jack encounters Tony, a pimp that he had previously fought; (Note: As depicted in Season 1, Episode 6, "Sources and Methods".) Tony takes him in and hides him from Konstantin. Radek, Alena Kovac's head of security, meets with Popov's assassin and kills him; he had originally hired the assassin. Jack reunites with Mike November in Greece, where he is now a private contractor. Elizabeth reveals that she knows that Greer is helping Jack, and sends Greer to Prague to meet with Kovac.
19	3	"Running with Wolves"	Jann Turner	Jennifer Kennedy	December 21, 2022
Jack and Mike November travel to Vienna to meet Zoya Ivanova and learn about Sokol. Mike November and Jack board a train to travel to Budapest, but alter the surveillance footage to make it seem like they are going to Semmering, Austria. On the train, they encounter Luka and Konstantin. Konstantin appears ready to kill Jack, but is unexpectedly shot and killed by Luka. Jack learns that it is a rogue Russian faction, not affiliated with the Russian government that is looking to destabilize western Europe and bring back the Soviet Union. Luka explains that he is trying to help Jack by getting him intelligence to keep the rogue faction from succeeding. Jack calls Elizabeth and tells her about this plot to resurrect the Soviet Union. At a Czech hunting lodge, Zubkov, Lychkin, Petrov and other Russians meet with Petr Kovac, Alena Kovac's father, and it hints that they are members of a rogue Russian faction. Petr Kovac shoots and kills Lychkin from the hunting party. In Prague, Greer meets with Alena Kovac and investigates the assassination at the stadium. Alena tells Greer that the Czech Republic will purchase surface-to-air missiles, which was a point of contention with the Russian government.
20	4	"Our Death's Keeper"	Jann Turner	Dario Scardapane	December 21, 2022
Luka confronts Petrov, and informs him Konstantin was a double agent, and has been killed. He threatens Petrov, warning him he needs allies. In Budapest, Jack and Mike plan a sting on a slippery arms dealer with the aid of Mike's colleague, Rami. They seek to ascertain the whereabouts of the uranium necessary for the Sokol nuclear device. Miller discounts Ryan's theory, and rebukes Wright ordering her to bring in Ryan. Rami hacks into Zubkov's schedule, and they disrupt his carefully controlled life. Greer and associates search Radek's flat and discovers some intriguing, and potentially incriminating, photographs of Petr Kovac. Kovac, meanwhile, has a flashback to the Sokol massacre. Mike and Jack abduct Georges, Zubkov's assistant, and set a trap for Zubkov. Greer sounds out Alena Kovac about Radek. The Czech Republic accepts NATO missiles, so Russia responds by moving theirs closer. Luka gets Mikhail to sign a confession, then executes him. Greer and Petr Kovac meet and assess each other. Rami slips a bomb into Zubkov's compound, and he panics and runs. Petr Kovac calls Petrov to keep him in line. Zubkov runs to a safe house, where Jack and Mike are waiting for him. They grill him for the location of the Uranium, and he divulges it is on its way to Russia. President Kovac tours the military base with the new missiles, then Radek abducts her from her motorcade.
21	5	"Druz'ya i Vragi"	Kevin Dowling	Marc Halsey and Amy Berg	December 21, 2022
Zubkov and Georges are taken into custody by the CIA. Jack and Mike head to a mysterious, abandoned outpost in Russia to seize the Sokol nuclear device, but an unexpected visitor foils their plans and the device eludes them. After a firefight, they are rescued. Jack makes a discovery about the device. Meanwhile, Petr seeks to rescue Alena, who has been kidnapped by her own head of security, Radek. Radek is murdered during the rescue. Wright is recalled and escorted home.
22	6	"Ghosts"	Kevin Dowling & David Petrarca	Amy Berg	December 21, 2022
Luka Goncharov meets with members of a rogue Russian faction, who are loading a nuclear device delivered by Goncharov into a truck. Meanwhile, Jack and Mike arrive at the US Embassy in Prague and, together with the American ambassador and Greer, try to determine the airfield where the Sokol nuclear device will arrive. The director of the CIA calls Elizabeth Wright to him, informs her of her dismissal and begins an operation to detain Jack, so that Ryan and Wright can then be brought to justice. Jack deceives the capture team and, together with Mike, surrenders to the Czech police. At this time, unknown people in Poland kidnap the daughter and wife of Radek, the former bodyguard of the Czech president. Jack and Mike meet with President Kovac and tell her about the Sokol plan of the rogue Russian faction that delivered a nuclear device to the Czech Republic and plans to detonate it. President Kovac calls an emergency meeting and warns the NATO command. The NATO military base has been alerted. Ryan discovers that the Russians' plan is not to undermine a military base but that their target is a convoy. Jack and Mike follow the NATO convoy by helicopter and warn them of the threat. Ryan suggests a reckless plan — one of the NATO vehicles lingers in the tunnel, blocking the way, giving the rest of the convoy time to leave. The lights go out in the tunnel and a Russian truck with nuclear weapons crashes into a NATO car and explodes, bringing down the tunnel along with the hill. At this time, Luka Goncharov meets with Petr Kovac, in whom he recognizes the former sergeant Petr Lebedev, who in 1969 disobeyed orders and deserted. President Kovac learns the location of her father from Radek's wife and Czech special forces storm the residence, killing Petr's guards. Alena Kovac disowns her father and leaves him to die, while Goncharov throws off new coordinates to Ryan. President Kovac, Jack Ryan, Mike November, James Greer and Luka Goncharov fly to Moscow.
23	7	"Moscow Rules"	Kevin Dowling & David Petrarca	Dario Scardapane	December 21, 2022
In Moscow, Jack teams up with Luka to expose high-ranking members of the clique in the government, who are now organizing a secret plan "Sokol". Luka goes to a meeting with Russian Defense Minister Alexei Petrov, who is going to get rid of Luka. Petrov arrives at the meeting and Luka manages to bring out the dialogue in such a way that Petrov in his own words confirms his involvement in the murder of Popov, his participation in the conspiracy and disloyalty to Russian President Surikov. Ryan helps Goncharov escape, after which Luka gives him a recording of Petrov's words. Mike, Greer and President Kovac meet with Popov's widow in Moscow and let her listen to a recording of Petrov's confession. The widow promises to arrange a meeting for Alena Kovac with President Surikov. At this time, President Surikov convenes the Russian Security Council, at which Defense Minister Petrov recommends continuing the escalation. Ryan and Goncharov search the house of captain 1st rank Rolan Antonov and find an order for the introduction of a nuclear-armed ship Fearless (Russian: Бесстрашный) into the Baltic Sea. The order was signed by Defense Minister Petrov, although he does not have such authority. Jack and Luka realize that this is the beginning of a coup d'etat, and this was the purpose of the Sokol plan. Ryan reports this to the CIA Director Elizabeth Wright, who passes this information to the US president, but he says that this data is not enough.
24	8	"Star on the Wall"	Jann Turner	Vaun Wilmott	December 21, 2022
Jack, Greer, Wright, Mike, Alena, and Luka are all working together to prevent the outbreak of World War III. Luka Goncharov arrives on the Russian warship Fearless, gets rid of the escort, but he has to surrender to the guards of ship captain Rolan Antonov. Defense Minister Petrov holds an informal meeting, where he begins voting for the removal of President Surikov from the leadership of the country. Through a system of underground tunnels, Alena Kovac and Mike November enter the Kremlin and meet with Russian President Surikov, who is given an audio recording of Petrov's confession about his participation in the conspiracy. Luka manages to persuade the executive officer of the Fearless, Danill Kagansky to release him. Despite Jack and Luka's intervention, the situation escalates into a small firefight between the Fearless and the USS Roosevelt. Ryan manages to keep the commander of the Roosevelt from responding promptly to the attack of the Fearless. Goncharov, together with Kagansky, go to the bridge and accuse Captain Antonov of giving illegal orders that were not approved by President Surkov and could start World War III. After successfully removing Antonov from command, Kagansky and Goncharov get in touch with the commander of the USS Roosevelt warship and completely de-escalate the situation. After exposing the coup d'etat, Russian President Surikov orders the arrests of Petrov and his accomplices in the top leadership of the Ministry of Defense, leading to Petrov being shot and killed by Kremlin security when they arrive to arrest him. The US President thanks Elizabeth Wright, after which he goes to a telephone conversation with President Surikov. A week later, Elizabeth Wright presents the Central Intelligence Agency Intelligence Star to Jack Ryan and James Greer, who narrowly averted the war. At this time, Luka is taken away, presumably ordered to be killed.

=== Season 4 (2023) ===
No. overall	No. in season	Title	Directed by	Written by	Original release date
25	1	"Triage"	Lukas Ettlin	Vaun Wilmott and Aaron Rabin and Steven Kane	June 30, 2023
New CIA Director Elizabeth Wright and her acting Deputy Director, Jack Ryan, report to the US president that the president of Nigeria has been assassinated. Jack later testifies to a US Senate committee that the CIA may have been involved in the assassination but it is now almost impossible to prove this due to the influence of former CIA Director Miller. The Marquez cartel has eliminated its last direct competitor in Mexico, to ensure its monopoly over US drug trafficking. Domingo Chavez, Marquez's cousin, is informed by Lieutenant Marales of the Mexican Federal police that the authorities consider the cartel weakened and are preparing to raid the cartel's laboratory. Chao Fah, a representative of an Asian triad, flies from Myanmar to Mexico to inspect the laboratory and meet with Marquez to make a deal with the cartel and start deliveries. He visits the laboratory but is interrupted by the police raid, deploying automatic weapons. Jack collects documentation for nine mysterious operations, but neither he nor James Greer can decipher Miller's file encryption. Ryan and Wright decide to stop funding and close these operations. Chavez enters Jack’s home surreptitiously and demands he restore funding for the closed operations within 24 hours.
26	2	"Convergence"	Jann Turner	Aaron Rabin	June 30, 2023
Jack Ryan delves into redacted files left by the CIA's former director, Miller, uncovering covert operations led by Domingo Chavez under a program named Pluto. Chavez reveals his unknowing ties to the Silver Lotus Triad through the Marquez cartel. The episode highlights the potential threat of a cartel-terrorist alliance at America's southern border. As Jack's investigation deepens, involving former agent Mike November and rekindling his relationship with Dr. Cathy Mueller, Miller is found dead in a staged suicide.
27	3	"Sacrifices"	Shana Stein	Jada M. Nation	July 7, 2023
Elizabeth arrives in Lagos as a US peace envoy, aiming to assure Nigeria's acting President Okoli that the CIA wasn't involved in the assassination of his predecessor. She's accompanied by Ade Osoji, a US-based oil lobbyist, who provides insights into Nigeria's political landscape. Meanwhile, Jack Ryan, after resigning from his deputy director position, teams up with Mike November and Domingo Chavez. Their mission leads them to Yucatan, Mexico, where they target the Marquez Cartel and Chao in Myanmar. The trio conducts a raid on a cartel drug lab, capturing triad contraband. Under pressure, Chavez's cartel contact reveals the location of "the marketplace" in Dubrovnik, Croatia, a hub for the Marquez and Silver Lotus Triad. Chao, fearing betrayal from the triad, takes drastic actions, highlighting the triad's involvement in human trafficking and money laundering. Elizabeth's candid approach is tested as the conspiracy within the CIA unfolds, and Greer faces threats to his and his son's life, emphasizing the sacrifices made by agents.
28	4	"Bethesda"	Jann Turner	Robert Port and Aaron Rabin	July 7, 2023
Jack Ryan, Domingo Chavez, and Mike November arrive in Dubrovnik, Croatia. Their objective is to connect with Chao at "The Marketplace," a black market run by Olafsky. To gain entry, they collaborate with Katarina, a high-end madam, and Zubkov, a Russian arms dealer from the previous season. However, their plan to meet Chao goes awry. Elizabeth Wright returns from Lagos, navigating political challenges, and trusting Jack's field decisions. James Greer investigates shell companies linked to Miller and faces an assassination attempt by Tuttle, but survives. Zeyara Lemos, a philanthropist close to Cathy Mueller and Elizabeth Wright, is revealed to be secretly aligned with the Silver Lotus Triad. She tasks Chao with overseeing the Myanmar operations. At Olafsky's party, the team discovers "triggers," mysterious devices with world-changing implications. After some fighting, they escape with the triggers. Chao then sends them coordinates.
29	5	"Wukong"	Lukas Ettlin	Joe Greskoviak and Aaron Rabin	July 14, 2023
Jack Ryan, Domingo Chavez, and Mike November, using false identities, enter Myanmar following coordinates provided by Chao. They are greeted by Chao, who is working undercover within Zeyara Lemos's criminal operation. Their mission is to thwart her plans and help Chao escape with his family. Zeyara lures Cathy Mueller to Myanmar under the guise of humanitarian aid to distract Jack. With Chao's assistance, the team infiltrates the Wukong Casino, placing explosives on the triggers in its vault. As events unfold, Zeyara's plans begin to crumble. Mike takes out her convoy, and Cathy manages to escape captivity. Chao is killed while his family escapes with Jack, Mike, and Domingo. The episode concludes with Jack's capture by Zeyara's forces.
30	6	"Proof of Concept"	Lukas Ettlin	Aaron Rabin	July 14, 2023
Jack Ryan endures torture by Zeyara Lemos, seeking details about her criminal plans. Domingo Chavez orchestrates a rescue, while Mike November arranges their escape. In DC, Elizabeth Wright becomes the new CIA director and confronts Ade Osoji, linked to Zeyara's schemes. Back in Myanmar, after intense torture, Jack is saved by Chavez who also kills Zeyara. The team discovers Zeyara's plan to smuggle bombs into the US. A border confrontation ensues, leading to the bombs' defusal. The episode wraps with Jack exposing Senator Henshaw's ties to Zeyara's operations.

== Production ==
=== Development ===
On September 22, 2015, it was announced that Carlton Cuse and Graham Roland were developing a television series adaptation of Tom Clancy's Jack Ryan series of novels. The potential series was described as "a new contemporary take on the character using the novels as source material". Production companies involved with the project were slated to include Paramount Television, Platinum Dunes and Skydance Media. A week later, following a bidding war among multiple television networks, it was announced that streaming service Amazon Video had purchased the rights to the series.

Amazon proceeded to put the production into development during which time they ordered three scripts written by Cuse and Roland. On August 16, 2016, it was announced that the production had been given a straight-to-series order for a first season consisting of ten episodes.

In January 2017, it was announced that Morten Tyldum would direct the pilot and that Daniel Sackheim would direct multiple episodes and produce the series.

On April 24, 2018, it was reported that Amazon had renewed the series. The second season was set in South America, where Ryan takes on "a dangerous, declining democratic regime." On May 14, 2018, it was reported that Richard Rutkowski had served as cinematographer for the pilot and that Checco Varese had acted in the role for the following seven episodes of season one.

On August 14, 2018, it was announced that Phil Abraham was joining the series as an executive producer and would direct the first two episodes of the second season.

On September 4, 2018, it was reported that Dennie Gordon would direct three episodes of season two and serve as an executive producer.

On February 13, 2019, Amazon renewed the series for a third season at the TCA press tour which was scheduled to be released on December 21, 2022.

On October 24, 2019, Paul Scheuring was reported to be the showrunner for season three, as well as an executive producer. Scheuring stepped down as showrunner in January 2020 "after discovering he wasn't a good fit". He was replaced by Vaun Wilmott, a writer and producer on Star Trek: Discovery.

On October 14, 2021, before the release of the third season, Amazon renewed the series for a fourth season.

On May 9, 2022, before the release of the third season, it was confirmed the series would end after the fourth season, which premiered on June 30, 2023. A spin-off revolving around Peña's character was also announced to be in development.

On October 30, 2024, it was announced that Amazon MGM Studios, Paramount Pictures and Skydance was developing a sequel film directed by Andrew Bernstein, written by Aaron Rabin, and starring John Krasinski and Wendell Pierce, who reprise their roles while Michael Kelly is in talks to rejoin the cast. Krasinski will also produce the film alongside Allyson Seeger via Sunday Night Productions.

=== Casting ===
On April 29, 2016, it was announced that John Krasinski had been cast in the series' title role. On November 3, 2016, it was reported that Abbie Cornish had been cast as Ryan's love interest Cathy Mueller. On December 16, 2016, it was announced that Wendell Pierce, Ali Suliman, and Dina Shihabi had been cast in series regular roles. In March 2017, it was announced that Peter Fonda, Mena Massoud, Timothy Hutton, and Al Sapienza had been cast in recurring roles. On June 5, 2017, it was reported that Amir El-Masry had joined the series in a supporting role.

Alongside the announcement of the series' renewal, it was confirmed that Krasinski and Pierce would return for the second season. On May 4, 2018, it was reported John Hoogenakker had been promoted to a series regular for season two after previously appearing in season one in a recurring capacity. On July 20, 2018, it was announced during Amazon's San Diego Comic-Con panel that Noomi Rapace had joined the main cast for season two. In August 2018, it was announced that Michael Kelly, Jovan Adepo, Jordi Molla, Cristina Umaña, and Francisco Denis had joined the cast of season two as series regulars. On September 25, 2018, it was reported that Tom Wlaschiha had been cast in a recurring role for season two. Upon the series' fourth-season renewal announcement, Michael Peña joined the cast in an undisclosed role. On October 18, 2021, it was reported that Cornish will reprise her role as Dr. Cathy Mueller for the fourth season.

=== Filming ===
Jack Ryan was filmed in multiple locations. On May 10, 2017, Krasinski was spotted filming his scenes in Washington, D.C. For the next several days the TV series was also shot in Maryland, Virginia, Quebec, London. Some scenes were shot in Paris and Chamonix, France.

- The first season features approximately 1,000 visual effects shots, including the opening bombing run in the pilot episode.
- Production for season two began in mid-2018 in Europe, South America, and the United States. Shooting locations included Bogotá, Colombia (standing in for Venezuela), London, Moscow and New York.
- Production on the third season of Jack Ryan began in May 2021, with locations including Prague, Czech Republic. Season 3 was released on Prime Video in December 2022.
- Production for season four began in February 2022, with locations including Dubrovnik, Croatia, the islands of Gran Canaria and Tenerife in Spain, Los Angeles, New York City and Budapest.

== Release ==
=== Premiere ===
On June 16, 2018, the series held its world premiere at the 58th Annual Monte-Carlo Television Festival at the Grimaldi Forum in Monte Carlo, Monaco. The event included a screening of the series' pilot episode that was attended by cast members John Krasinski, Dina Shihabi and Wendell Pierce, alongside series creators, showrunners and executive producers Carlton Cuse and Graham Roland.

=== Home media ===
Paramount Home Media Distribution released Blu-ray and DVD disc editions of the first season of Jack Ryan on June 4, 2019. The Blu-ray edition includes deleted scenes and Dolby Atmos surround soundtrack not available when viewing through Amazon Prime.

== Reception ==
Critical response of Jack Ryan
Season	Rotten Tomatoes	Metacritic
1	75% (85 reviews)	66 (28 reviews)
2	67% (27 reviews)	56 (6 reviews)
3	81% (21 reviews)	73 (4 reviews)
4	87% (15 reviews)	73 (4 reviews)

On Rotten Tomatoes it received an overall score of 77%, and an overall score of 67 on Metacritic.

=== Season 1 ===
The series premiered to a positive critical response. On the review aggregation website Rotten Tomatoes, the first season holds an approval rating of 75% with an average rating of 6.4 out of 10, based on 85 reviews. The site's critical consensus reads: "Though not as thematically rich as some of its geopolitical predecessors, Jack Ryan is a satisfying addition to the genre buoyed by exceptional action sequences and a likable cast." Metacritic, which uses a weighted average, assigned the season a score of 66 out of 100 based on 28 critics, indicating "generally favorable reviews".

In a positive review, RogerEbert.com's Nick Allen praised the series saying, "Expertly plotted by creators Carlton Cuse and Graham Roland, Tom Clancy's Jack Ryan is all the more impactful for its restraint and scope, offering excellent character-based drama that's concerned with much more than just its namesake." Similarly favorable, The Gazette's Terry Terrones awarded the series a grade of "A−" and directed specific approval towards Krasinski's performance saying, "This version of Jack Ryan is relatable, but also admirable because the actor portraying him can balance so many aspects of the character with ease. Krasinski plays him so naturally I couldn't tell where he ended and Ryan began." In another enthusiastic appraisal, Rolling Stone's Alan Sepinwall accorded the series three and a half stars out of five and complimented it saying, "Like Jack Ryan himself, the Amazon show is smart and confident and thorough. That's enough to get the job done."

In a more mixed assessment, TVLine's Dave Nemetz gave the series a grade of "C+" and offered the series restrained commendation saying, "Amazon's awkwardly titled Tom Clancy's Jack Ryan is at its best when things are exploding, delivering a number of impressively high-octane action sequences on a scale rarely seen on television. The rest of the series, though, is disappointingly mediocre ... and its choice of leading man may be a major stumbling block." In a negative critique, Vanity Fair's Sonia Saraiya chastised the show saying "Tom Clancy's Jack Ryan is hysterical. Hysterical as in histrionic; hysterical as in somehow funny; hysterical as in you wish its team had worked harder to take the temperature of the world around us before sending this highly charged and obscenely blinkered James Bond manqué into the world." Equally dismissive, Paste's Amy Amatangelo criticized the series saying, "But more often than not, the show plods along with no real sense of urgency. I often had to restrain myself from scrolling through my phone. I was that bored while I was watching. Those indoctrinated into the Jack Ryan canon via the books or the movies will find the eight-episode series is faithful to the spirit of all that preceded it. I'm just not sure we needed it at all."

=== Season 2 ===
Previews of season two, in which Ryan ends up on a mission to Venezuela to "bring stability to a country on the brink of collapse", has been criticized by the government of Venezuela for allegedly promoting an invasion of the country by the United States. Venezuela's Minister of Cultural Affairs, Ernesto Villegas, described previews of the show as "Crass war propaganda disguised as entertainment". Venezuelan actor Francisco Denis, who plays Ubarri, a senior Venezuelan government official in the new season, responded to his government's criticism by highlighting the fictional character of the series. "I don't think the CIA needs [a show like] this to intervene or not in a country," he said. Denis did regret that the series has included mistakes such as the fictitious meeting of the Venezuelan president with the CIA—which, in his opinion, would never occur under the current administrations—or presenting the most powerful man in the country as "basking in luxury".

On Rotten Tomatoes, the season holds an approval rating of 67% based on 27 reviews, with an average rating of 6.7 out of 10. The site's critics consensus reads: "Jack Ryan's second season is both more refined and more predictable, doubling down on its espionage set-pieces while toning down its titular character's moral complexities to create a more straight-forward spy show." Metacritic, based upon 6 critics, assigned the season a score of 56 out of 100, indicating "mixed or average reviews".

Tim Goodman of The Hollywood Reporter gave a favorable review:

Jack Ryan is still fun, despite being a little bit ridiculous and predictable ... Not all the events described above make perfect sense and there's definitely some bloat here storytelling-wise, but that never seems to cut into the pacing. It's a strong, appealing cast and an entertaining story — the same successful formula as the first season and a welcome return visitor to the living room.

=== Season 3 ===
On Rotten Tomatoes, the third season holds an approval rating of 81% based on 21 reviews, with an average rating of 6.6 out of 10. The site's critics consensus reads: "Leaning harder than ever on John Krasinski's earthy charisma, Jack Ryan gets the job done with a third season that doesn't reinvent the formula but executes it with the utmost efficiency." Metacritic, based upon 4 critics, assigned the season a score of 73 out of 100, indicating "generally favorable reviews".

=== Season 4 ===
On Rotten Tomatoes, the fourth season holds an approval rating of 87% based on 15 reviews, with an average rating of 7 out of 10. The site's critics consensus reads: "Reporting in for one final mission, Jack Ryan's fourth season is tasked with delivering brainy thrills and ably gets the job done." Metacritic, based upon 4 critics, assigned the season a score of 73 out of 100, indicating "generally favorable reviews".

=== Awards and nominations ===
Year	Award	Category	Nominee(s)	Result	Ref.
2019	Critics' Choice Television Awards	Best Supporting Actress in a Drama Series	Dina Shihabi	Nominated	
2019	Golden Reel Awards	Broadcast Media: Short Form Dialogue / ADR	Jon Wakeham, Micah Loken, Tim Tuchrello and Benjamin L. Cook (for "The Wolf")	Nominated	
2019	Golden Reel Awards	Broadcast Media: Short Form Effects / Foley	TBA (for "French Connection")	Nominated	
2019	Golden Reel Awards	Broadcast Media Longform Effects / Foley	TBA (for "Pilot")	Nominated	
2019	Location Managers Guild Awards	Outstanding Locations in Contemporary Television	Lori Balton, Arnaud Kaiser, Christian McWilliams, Peggy Pridemore and Michele St-Arnaud	Won	
2019	Primetime Creative Arts Emmy Awards	Sound Editing for a Comedy or Drama Series (One-Hour)	Benjamin Cook, Jon Wakeham, Hector Gika, David Esparza, Tim Tuchrello, Alex Levy, Brett Voss, Jeff Wilhoit and Dylan Tuomy-Wilhoit (for "Pilot")	Nominated	
2019	Primetime Creative Arts Emmy Awards	Special Visual Effects in a Supporting Role	Erik Henry, Matt Robken, Jamie Klein, Pau Costa Moeller, Bobo Skipper, Deak Ferrand, Crawford Reilly, Joseph Karsparian and Francois Lambert (for "Pilot")	Nominated	
2019	Saturn Awards	Best Streaming Science Fiction, Action & Fantasy Series	Tom Clancy's Jack Ryan	Nominated	
2019	Saturn Awards	Best Actor in a Streaming Presentation	John Krasinski	Nominated	
2019	Screen Actors Guild Awards	Outstanding Performance by a Male Actor in a Drama Series	John Krasinski	Nominated	
2019	Screen Actors Guild Awards	Outstanding Performance by a Stunt Ensemble in a Television Series	Tom Clancy's Jack Ryan	Nominated	
2019	Visual Effects Society Awards	Outstanding Supporting Visual Effects in a Photoreal Episode	Erik Henry, Matt Robken, Bobo Skipper, Deak Ferrand and Pau Costa (for "Pilot")	Won	
2020	Cinema Audio Society Awards	Outstanding Achievement in Sound Mixing for Television Series – One Hour	Jorge Adrados, Steve Pederson, Daniel Leahy, Benjamin Darier and Brett Voss (for "Persona Non-Grata")	Nominated	
2020	Actors and Actresses Union Awards	Best Actor in an International Production	Jordi Mollá	Nominated	
2020	Primetime Creative Arts Emmy Awards	Special Visual Effects in a Supporting Role	Erik Henry, Juliette Yager, Peter Crosman, Pau Costa Moeller, Paige Prokop, Deak Ferrand, Francois Lambert, Jesper Kjolsrud and Richard Vosper-Carey (for "Strongman")	Nominated	
2021	Saturn Awards	Best Action/Thriller Television Series	Tom Clancy's Jack Ryan	Nominated	

=== Venezuela clip resurfacing ===
In January 2026, a scene from the season two premiere episode "Cargo" (2019) circulated widely online and was discussed on cable news following the U.S. operation that captured Venezuelan president Nicolás Maduro. The clip, in which Jack Ryan outlines Venezuela's resource wealth, political instability, and humanitarian crisis, was described by some commentators as "prophetic". Responding to the characterization, series co-creator Carlton Cuse said, "The goal of that season wasn't prophecy; it was plausibility". On CNN, Jake Tapper said the resemblance reflected "truth following fiction following truth", noting that Venezuela's instability and resource wealth predated both the series and the real-world events.

== Sequel film ==
In October 2024, it was announced that a feature film follow-up to the series was in development, with Andrew Bernstein serving as director on the project with a script written by Aaron Rabin. John Krasinski and Wendell Pierce will reprise their roles as Jack Ryan and James Greer, respectively. The studio entered early negotiations with Michael Kelly to also return in his role from the series; while Krasinski, Allyson Seeger, and Andrew Form will produce the movie. The project will be a joint-venture production between Amazon MGM Studios, Sunday Night Productions and Paramount Pictures. The film, titled Jack Ryan: Ghost War, was confirmed to be in production on February 19, 2025.
