= Jay Simon =

British actor (born 1966)

- Born: 17 December 1966 (age 59); London, England
- Occupation: Actor
- Spouse: Nicola
- Children: 3

Jay Simon (born 17 December 1966) is an English actor best known for screen roles including: Doug in The Royal Treatment, Alan Griever in Filthy Rich, Senator Regulus in Roman Empire (TV Series), Papa Monster and Edisson in The Molly Monster Movie, the Flight Attendant in The Wedding Date, Billy Hennessy in Jack Higgins' Midnight Man and Lionel Symon in Stephen Poliakoff's Perfect Strangers.

== Early years ==
Jay Simon was born on 17 December 1966 in London. He appeared as a solo singer in various productions for the English National Opera, including Carmen, Tosca and Jonathan Miller's The Magic Flute, in 1979 at the age of thirteen.

He went on to study Drama at the University College of Wales, Aberystwyth (1988–91). After graduation he was offered a post as Assistant Director to Marina Caldarone, in George F. Walker's Nothing Sacred, an adaption of Turgenev's play Fathers and sons at Theatr Clwyd. He then spent two years with the TIE company Traffic of the Stage spending days touring shows An Introduction to Shakespeare and The Mole Catcher's Daughter, and working nights as an upper stage crew hand at the Drury Lane Theatre's production of Miss Saigon.

== Career ==
Simon subsequently travelled to Canada, playing Lysander, in a production of A Midsummer-Night's Dream for the Edmonton Fringe Festival, Alberta, Canada and toured a one-man show, Merely Players around British Columbia. He studied film acting at Gas-town Actors' Centre, Vancouver under teacher Brent Stait. Also in British Columbia, he was invited to teach acting and improvisation to Canada's indigenous native actors (through the Spirit-Song Theatre Company). His most famous pupils included Chief Dan George's grandchildren.

He later enjoyed teaching Method at the Tibetan Llamo Theatre Institute, Dharamsala, India.

Returning to the U.K., he starred as Celadon in Mike Westbrook's TV Opera Good Friday 1663, for Channel Four directed by Frank Cvitanovitch. He was subsequently offered stage roles, including Orin Scrivello in Jersey Opera's Little Shop of Horrors and Sky Masterson, in Pimlico Opera's Guys and Dolls. He went on to star as Mark Trelawny in A Dangerous Obsession in The English Theatre of Hamburg and as Captain Lombard, in Vienna's English Theatre production of And Then There Were None. He was subsequently invited back to play Freddy, in George Bernard Shaw's Pygmalion. Roles in Shakespeare include Orsino in Twelfth Night and Don Pedro in Much Ado About Nothing for the British Shakespeare Company.

Simon's other television credits include: Straight Forward (NZ Screentime 2019), Shortland Street, EastEnders, Highlander, The Knock, Fur TV (TV series), Goodnight Sweetheart, Bernard's Watch, Genie in the House, The Bill, Casualty, Holby City, Agony, Murder in Suburbia, Perfect Strangers, Comic Relief, Barbara, Fur TV and My Family.

Other film work includes: Heavy Duty (2012), playing the villainous Russian gang leader Gregorin. Directed by Rhys Hayward and produced by Hand made films); Bollywood movie The Pinocchio Effect, This Charming Man, The Knight and the Templar, and Daybreak. He has also written, directed and starred as Fate in his own short film, The Wheel of Fortune.

Simon is a voice artiste/impressionist. He has contributed to numerous current affairs programmes, including Dispatches, Panorama and BBC's Newsnight. He was one of the artists who dubbed Gerry Adams' voice during the 1988–94 ban on IRA broadcasting, and he later voiced Tony Blair for the BBC during the Hutton Inquiry. He has worked on current affairs programmes and documentaries including The Super Human Body, World War II in Colour, Britain at War, The Meadow, Diana: The Witnesses in the Tunnel, and China's wild side.

He has narrated the popular television series China's Hidden lands, Future Car, Egypt's Missing Queen, The Bermuda Triangle and MegaStructures. His narrated films include The Meadow, Le Pied (as Woody Allen) and Death Leap.

He voiced an American Drill Sergeant in the award-winning short film Invisible.

Jay has voiced characters in over forty video games including the character of Yaevinn in the video game The Witcher. Most recently he voiced Einhar Frey and Nico the Mad for the New Zealand produced Path of Exileand Nick Lighbearer and Johnny Bolton among many characters for the dystopian nightmare video game We Happy few Compulsion Games.

Simon has also created many characters for many popular children's television programmes, including Finley the Fire Engine (Dex and Suds), It's a Big Big World (Oko and Wartz), Molly Monster (Papa and Edison) and the Bafta-nominated Just So Darwin (various animals).

He can be heard on many radio and television commercials and has provided countless characters for video games including : Path of Exile (Grinding Gear Games), Haze, Farscape, Jericho, Spartan: Total Warrior and the title role of Kaydara.

A.D.R. work includes The King (Netflix 2019), The Program (Working Title Films 2015), The Tudors, Foyle's War and Call the Midwife on TV, and Ridley Scott's Robin Hood, Defiance, Spygame and The Bourne Identity in film. His most recent A.D.R contribution was on Peter Jackson's final episode of the Tolkien adaption: The Hobbit: The Battle of the Five Armies (2014).

In 2012 Simon moved to New Zealand with his wife Nicola and three children, where he continues to work in film, television and theatre. He has appeared as Doug in The Royal Treatment(2022 Netflix movie)), Alan Griever in Filthy Rich', Senator Regulus in 'Roman Empire 3 (2019)' Aarne in Bombshell: The Sinking of the Rainbow Warrior, Bryan Petersen in an NZ/Danish co produced TV series Straight Forward, The Guy and Harley Show and the popular soap Shortland Street as English heart surgeon Dr John Petersen. Feature film appearances include Older (Pigville Productions 2015) and ARA (Zodiac entertainment 2016). He has worked on short films The Black Dog (2013), friends like these (2017), and two short Zombie horror films Clear Eyes: The Rise of the Zombies and Clear Eyes: The Scourge of the Zombies (2014), directed by Fred Potts and produced by Black widow films.

In 2013 he voiced one of the alien villains Blufur in the popular children's sci-fi series Power Rangers: Megaforce. This was followed by two more seasons of Power Rangers.In 2016 He voiced the monster Hunter in Power Rangers Dino Charge and in 2018 the monsters Gorrox and Versix for Power Rangers Ninja Steel.

Simon later briefly returned to London to star in a musical movie version of the popular animated children's series Molly Monster (reprising the roles of Papa and Edison, and other smaller parts including the Monster Captain).

Back in New Zealand Jay has since voiced the Thoriphant Bounty and Man in the Kiwi animated 2019 feature Mosley (Huhu Studios) and various characters in the popular Kiwi animated series Quimbo's Quest as well as the Skaer and the Codex for the popular cult movie This Giant Papier-Mâché Boulder Is Actually Really Heavy (2016) directed by Christian Nicholson.
