= Ahmad Al-Bazz =

Palestinian filmmaker and journalist (born 1993)

- Born: 16 January 1993 (age 33); Nablus, Palestine
- Education: An-Najah National University; (BA); University of East Anglia (MA)
- Occupations: Filmmaker and Journalist
- Notable work: Homenessness (2018); To My Mother (2014)

Ahmad Al-Bazz (born 16 January 1993) is a Palestinian documentary filmmaker and journalist. He has awards such as the Al-Jazeera Documentary Channel Award for Best Arab Short Doc in 2015, and was also shortlisted in 2020 for the Thomson Foundation Young Journalist Award. He is a member of the Activestills photography collective since 2012. Ahmad has written two documentaries: To My Mother in 2014 and Homenessness in 2018.

== Early life and education ==
Ahmad was born on 16 January 1993 in Nablus. In 2014, Ahmad graduated from An-Najah National University in Nablus, where he achieved a Bachelor of Arts in Media & Mass communication. He also graduated from the University of East Anglia in England, where he completed an Master of Arts in television studies.

== Filmography ==
Title	Year	Ref.
To My Mother	2014	
Homenessness	2018	
