= Ameen Nayfeh =

Palestinian film director and writer (born 1988)

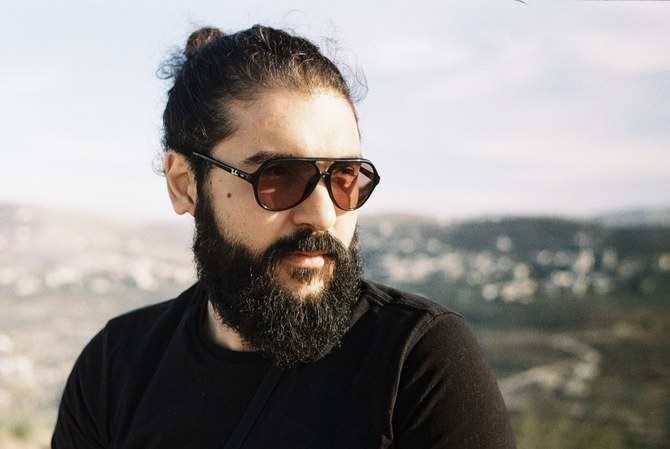
- Born: 1988 (age 37–38); Palestine
- Occupations: Director, writer
- Years active: 2012–present

Ameen Nayfeh (Arabic: أمين نايفه; born 1988) is a Palestinian film director and writer. He is best known for his work on the feature film 200 Meters and short film The Crossing.

== Life and career ==
Nayfeh was born in Tulkarm, Palestine. He graduated with a B.Sc. in nursing from Al-Quds University and an MFA in Cinematic studies from the Red Sea Institute of Cinematic Arts. His debut feature film 200 Meters, starring Ali Suliman, about a Palestinian family separated by the Israeli wall, premiered at the Venice Film Festival in 2020.

== Filmography ==
Year	Film	Director	Writer	Note
2020	200 Meters	Yes	Yes	Feature film
2017	The Crossing	Yes	Yes	Short film
2014	Suspended Time 'Zaman Muaalaq'	Yes	Yes	Segment:Interference
2012	The Eid Gift	Yes		Documentary short
2012	The Uppercut	Yes		Documentary short
2012	3:30		Yes	Short film

== Awards and nominations ==
Year	Result	Award	Category	Work	Ref.
2024	Won	Sahara International Film Festival	White Camel winner	200 meters	
2021	Won	Fajr International Film Festival	Best Script	200 Meters	
2021	Won	Fajr International Film Festival	Best Film	200 Meters	
2021	Won	Atlanta Jewish Film Festival	Human Rights Jury Prize	200 Meters	
2021	Nominated	Camerimage	Directors' Debuts	200 Meters	
2020	Won	Thessaloniki International Film Festival	Best Feature Film	200 Meters	
2020	Won	Thessaloniki International Film Festival	Special Jury Award for Best Director	200 Meters	
2020	Won	International Film Festival of India	CFT UNESCO - Gandhi Award	200 Meters	
2020	Won	Golden Rooster Awards	Best International Film	200 Meters	
2020	Won	Le Giornate degli Autori	The BNL People's Choice Award	200 Meters	
2020	Won	El Gouna Film Festival	FIPRESCI Award	200 Meters	
2020	Won	El Gouna Film Festival	Cinema for Humanity Prize	200 Meters	
2018	Nominated	Carthage Film Festival	Best Narrative Short Film	The Crossing	
2017	Nominated	Dubai International Film Festival	Best Film - Short	The Crossing	
