= Copenhagen Cowboy =

Danish supernatural thriller television series

- Genre: Drama; Noir-thriller; Supernatural
- Created by: Nicolas Winding Refn
- Developed by: Nicolas Winding Refn; Sara Isabella Jönsson
- Written by: Sara Isabella Jönsson; Johanne Algren; Mona Masri
- Directed by: Nicolas Winding Refn
- Starring: Angela Bundalovic; Andreas Lykke Jørgensen; Li Li Zhang; Zlatko Burić; Jason Hendil-Forssell; Hok Kit Cheng; Lola Corfixen
- Music by: Cliff Martinez; Peter Peter; Peter Kyed; Julian Winding
- Country of origin: Denmark
- Original languages: Danish; Serbian; Chinese; English
- No. of episodes: 6

Production
- Executive producers: Nicolas Winding Refn; Liv Corfixen; Matthew Newman; David Frost; Peter Hanson
- Producers: Lene Børglum; Christina Bostofte Erritzøe
- Production location: Copenhagen, Denmark
- Cinematography: Magnus Nordenhof Jønck
- Editors: Allan Funch; Matthew Newman; Olivier Bugge Coutté; Olivia Neergaard-Holm
- Running time: 60 minutes
- Production company: byNWR

Original release
- Network: Netflix
- Release: 5 January 2023

Copenhagen Cowboy is a supernatural noir-thriller television series created by Nicolas Winding Refn for Netflix. The first Danish-language work by Refn since Pusher 3 (2005), it follows Miu (Angela Bundalovic), a renegade with various psychic abilities who goes on an unknown quest on Copenhagen's criminal underworld.

== Series overview ==
A young enigmatic renegade named Miu, rumored to be a psychic that brings luck to her surroundings, revisits Copenhagen with an unknown motive. Navigating its criminal underworld, Miu encounters various adversaries, supernatural and otherwise, while meeting various individuals she grows to care about. Miu eventually encounters a threatening presence, Rakel, who has similar powers to her own.

== Cast ==
=== Main ===
- Angela Bundalovic as Miu, a young mysterious psychic rumored to bring good luck.
- Andreas Lykke Jørgensen as Nicklas, a malicious young man who comes from a mysterious and affluent family, who is gifted with spiritual powers.
- LiLi Zhang as Jang a.k.a. "Mother Hulda", owner of a Chinese diner named "Dragon Palace".
- Jason Hendil-Forssell as Mr. Chiang, a notorious gang leader and casino owner who uses Dragon Palace as a body disposal site.
- Zlatko Burić as Miroslav, an independent lawyer who serves Copenhagen criminals as clients and has had prior contacts with Miu.
- Hok Kit Cheng as Ying, Mr. Chiang's second-in-command
- Fleur Frilund as Jessica, Flora's friend who is one of Miroslav's clients.

=== Recurring ===
- Liv Corfixen as older version of Miu.
- Lizzielou Corfixen as younger version of Miu.
- Lola Corfixen as Rakel, Nicklas' "sister" who has similar abilities as Miu.
- Valentina Dejanovic as Cimona, a female prostitute who befriends Miu.
- Adam Buschard as Aske, a professional hunter who is a loyal servant of Nicklas' family.
- Maria Erwolter as Beate, Nicklas' affluent and overindulging mother.
- Thomas Algren as Michael, Nicklas' affluent and narcissistic father.
- Dragana Milutinović as Rosella, a superstitious Serbian half-sister of André who houses his prostitutes.
- Ramadan Huseini as André, an Albanian pimp who runs a brothel under the pretense of a "modeling agency".
- Leif Sylvester as Arne, Hulda's regular customer who is a pigfarmer.
- Emilie Xin Tong Han as Ai, Hulda's daughter who Chiang took away from her as a collateral.
- Slavko Labović as Dusan, Miroslav's old friend who often shows brash personality.
- Ebiriama Jaiteh as Danny, a meticulous facilitator of a drug dealing gang.
- Nicki Dirschen Hansen as Polixen, Miroslav's contact who is member of a drug dealing gang.
- Gustav Hejlesen as Bjarke, Miroslav's contact who is a member of a drug dealing gang.
- Dafina Zeqiri as Flora, André's 18-year-old daughter.
- Per Thiim Thim as Sven, Rosella's husband through an arranged marriage.
- Daniel Sami Strandet as Dardan, one of André's henchmen.
- Thjerza Balaj as Ljiliana, one of André's prostitutes.
- Sandra Vukicevic as Mima, one of André's prostitutes.
- Neesha Dewa, Rahel Meconen, Lea Bach Nielsen, Isabella Kjær Westermann, Rose-Maria Kjær Westermann, Vigga Nue Møller plays other versions of Miu respectively.

=== Guest ===
- Nicolas Winding Refn as Jørgen, one of the drug dealing clients whom Miu meets.
- Mads Brügger as Jonas, one of the drug dealing clients whom Miu meets.
- Mikael Bertelsen as Steen, one of the drug dealing clients whom Miu meets.
- Hideo Kojima as Hideo, a fictionalized version of himself who is one of Miroslav's associates.
- Lina Brink Jakobsen as My Kin, Hulda's associate who provides new identities for Golden Dragon's employee.
- Dragana Dan as Mihaela, Rosella's friend who works as a seer.
- Ruiqi Xu as an unnamed pregnant woman.

== Episodes ==
No.	Title	Directed by	Written by	Original release date
1	"Miu the Mysterious"	Nicolas Winding Refn	Sara Isabella Jønsson	January 5, 2023
Miu, a mysterious girl rumored to bring good luck and having psychic abilities, is brought to a mansion in Copenhagen where Rosella welcomes her, hiring her as a good luck charm. Rosella soon requests Miu to ensure her pregnancy, offering 10,000 kr. in cash, which she accepts. Miu soon learns more about Rosella's involvement with her half-brother, André, a pimp who uses a cover of a modeling agency to hire women as prostitutes. Miu later befriends Cimona, one of André's prostitutes, after lending her cellphone to her. When Rosella shows signs of a pregnancy, Miu demands her promised payment, only to be deceived by Rosella by promising less payments. On the next day, Rosella seemingly has a miscarriage. Assuming Miu's involvement in the miscarriage, she then sends Miu to the prostitutes' room, confiscating her possessions. Eventually, Cimona asks Miu to run away together with her, planning to meet Miu at a diner on late night, which Miu accepts. Cimona's plan unfortunately fails when she encounters Nicklas, her previous client, and he eventually strangles her to death at an unknown pig-shed, leaving Miu alone at the diner.
2	"Vengeance Is My Name"	Nicolas Winding Refn	Sara Isabella Jønsson	January 5, 2023
Miu notices Flora, André's daughter, dating Dardan, one of his henchmen, is outside the diner. Flora, in turn, asks Miu to keep her relationship a secret, to which the latter seemingly complies. Miu then goes back to Rosella's mansion, searching for Cimona's whereabouts before encountering Rosella and her friend, Mihaela, who sensed a "demonic presence" from Miu. Rosella, in turn, sends her friend out before holding Miu at a gunpoint, asking Sven, her husband, to keep an eye on her. Eventually, Rosella brings André in to pick up Miu, with both agreeing to sell Miu as a prostitute for an 80:20 split in profits. Later in André's Club, Miu gives away Flora's secret to André, to his disbelief. Miu eventually escapes the club with the help of the prostitutes while André is having conversations with both Flora and Dardan. Miu then visits Rosella's mansion once more on late night, this time constraining Rosella to her bed before burning her alive, revealing Miu's original intent on visiting her. Miu later finds a Chinese diner named "Dragon Palace", meeting Jang, a.k.a. "Mother Hulda", the owner of the diner, who tells her to leave, to which she initially complies. Mother Hulda ultimately lets Miu stay in the diner after Miu helps her delivering a baby from an unknown woman while saving the baby through unknown means.
3	"Dragon Palace"	Nicolas Winding Refn	Johanne Algren, Sara Isabella Jønsson, and Mona Masri	January 5, 2023
Miu intends to leave the diner with Mother Hulda insisting that she stays, which she accepts. Mother Hulda then proceeds to give Miu a false identity in order to employ her in the diner. A casino owner and Hulda's debtor named Mr. Chiang comes to the diner later that night, having heard of miraculous feats Miu performed, demands Mother Hulda to have Miu deal with his migraines, which she complies. Miu eventually "removes" the migraine from Chiang, putting him to sleep whilst reading his memories. Having known in detail of his connection with Mother Hulda, Miu soon confronts Mother Hulda, with her confirming Miu's statements. Miu and Mother Hulda later visits an estate-owned pig-shed managed by Arne, Hulda's regular customer, trying to buy a new pig. Hulda soon tries to negotiate with the shed owners, Beate and Michael, while Miu gradually sensing Cimona's presence as well as her killer's presence in the main estate. Having suspicions with the whole estate, Miu ultimately insists on investigating the estate on her own and Mother Hulda leaving the premise, which Hulda accepts.
4	"From Mr. Chiang with Love"	Nicolas Winding Refn	Sara Isabella Jønsson and Johanne Algren	January 5, 2023
Miu wanders around the estate, gaining stronger connection with Cimona's presence as she approaches the lake. She soon learns the truth of Cimona's murder before encountering Nicklas, who had been obsessed with Miu due to André's actions. Nicklas gives Miu a headstart before chasing her down to the pig-shed. Miu, however, eventually bested Nicklas in combat before knocking him unconscious, leaving him to be eaten by the farmed pigs. Later, Miu is approached by Ying, Mr. Chiang's subordinate, bringing her to Chiang's casino. Miu then meets Chiang again, with the latter requests her to alleviate his migraines once more, which she accepts. Miu ultimately forms a deal with Chiang, reuniting Hulda with her daughter, Ai, while putting herself on a debt to him. Miu later visits Miroslav, an underground lawyer, in his apartment, eventually securing a job as a drug dealer with his help. Miu soon learn the ropes of drug-dealing with the aid of Danny, one of the facilitators. While Miu adapts to her new job, Michael and Beate are seen interacting with few of Miu's customers, revealing Nicklas' survival and their attempt on his full recovery.
5	"Copenhagen"	Nicolas Winding Refn	Johanne Algren	January 5, 2023
Miu learns from Danny that a gang warfare is about to happen with him demanding that Miu should never cross him and his gang, which she complies. Danny soon takes Miu to one of his hideouts where they are tasked to secure a bag containing a copious amount of cocaine. While carrying the bag, both of them are ambushed by a group of rivaling gangs. Miu and Danny kills the group at the cost of Danny's life with Miu carrying the bag to Mr. Chiang's casino, crossing the gang in the process. Miu then gives the bag to Chiang claiming that the contents are more than enough to settle her debt, with the latter soon changes the condition of the deal, telling her to assassinate someone else instead, which she accepts. Miu later revisits Miroslav's apartment again, finding the furious lawyer telling her that the gang just told him about Miu's betrayal. Miroslav then states Miu's true reason of staying with him while claiming his desire to make amends. Miu soon frightens Miroslav to tears before asking what he knows about her, which he answers. Miu eventually kills Dusan, Miroslav's associate, through an unknown method, revealing that he was Chiang's target. Meanwhile, Nicklas, now emaciated, talks to his "sister", Rakel, who is currently in an astral realm, with the former asking her to kill Miu. Rakel accepts under the condition of Nicklas offering his mother, Beate's, blood. Nicklas eventually kills his mother and successfully "revives" Rakel.
6	"The Heavens Will Fall"	Nicolas Winding Refn	Johanne Algren	January 5, 2023
Miu, who successfully holds her end of the deal, reunites with Mother Hulda, who is ecstatic to meet Ai again. Both of them soon visit the casino, meeting Mr. Chiang, who has been drawing pictures with Ai. Chiang eventually holds his end of the deal by giving up his custody of Ai for good, revealing that Ai is Chiang's biological daughter and Hulda's deceit by hiding that fact from Miu. Miu soon part ways from Hulda, choosing to stay with Chiang. Having been hurt, Chiang soon confesses to Miu that Hulda was a prostitute who insisted on being a part of his life, now asking Miu to "heal his heart". Miu accepts the request and accompanies him for a while. Chiang who eventually recovers emotionally and seemingly shares Miu's psychic powers with her, now professes his love for Miu, asking her to marry him, which she refuses. Disappointed, Chiang then threatens to kill Miu, Hulda, and Ai, with Miu engaging him in combat as a response. Chiang initially bested her in combat before Miu eventually overpowers and seemingly kills him. Meanwhile, Nicklas, who has brought Rakel back to life, assigns Aske, a professional hunter and his loyal servant, to hunt a human in order to nourish Rakel. Aske eventually kills a business man and carves out his heart. Aske then cooks the human heart before serving it to Rakel, who recovers her power after eating it. Rakel then tries read Nicklas' mind, inquiring information about Miu, with the former unveils Miu's identity of being a hive-mind. Miu is later seen wandering in the woods, reuniting with her other selves, spotting the man Aske just killed a while ago before sensing Rakel's presence, now prepared for a battle, which horrifies Miu and her other selves. Simultaneously, Miroslav, who has learned of Dusan's demise earlier, is seen calling a Japanese man named Hideo, who advises him to see the "giants" if he wants to survive.

== Production ==
=== Development ===
In July 2022, Netflix commissioned Copenhagen Cowboy as one of its Danish Netflix original series. Refn directed and executive-produced the series through his own production company, byNWR. Joining him as producers are Lene Børglum and Christina Bostofte Erritzøe. Sara Isabella Jönsson, Johanne Algren and Mona Masri were attached to write the series. In September 2022, it was revealed that Liv Corfixen would also produce.

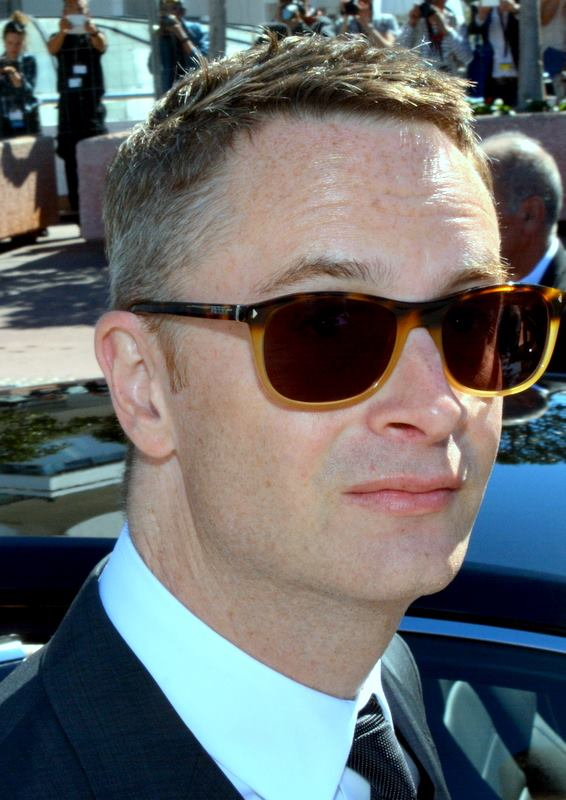
Nicolas Winding Refn, Copenhagen Cowboy creator and director

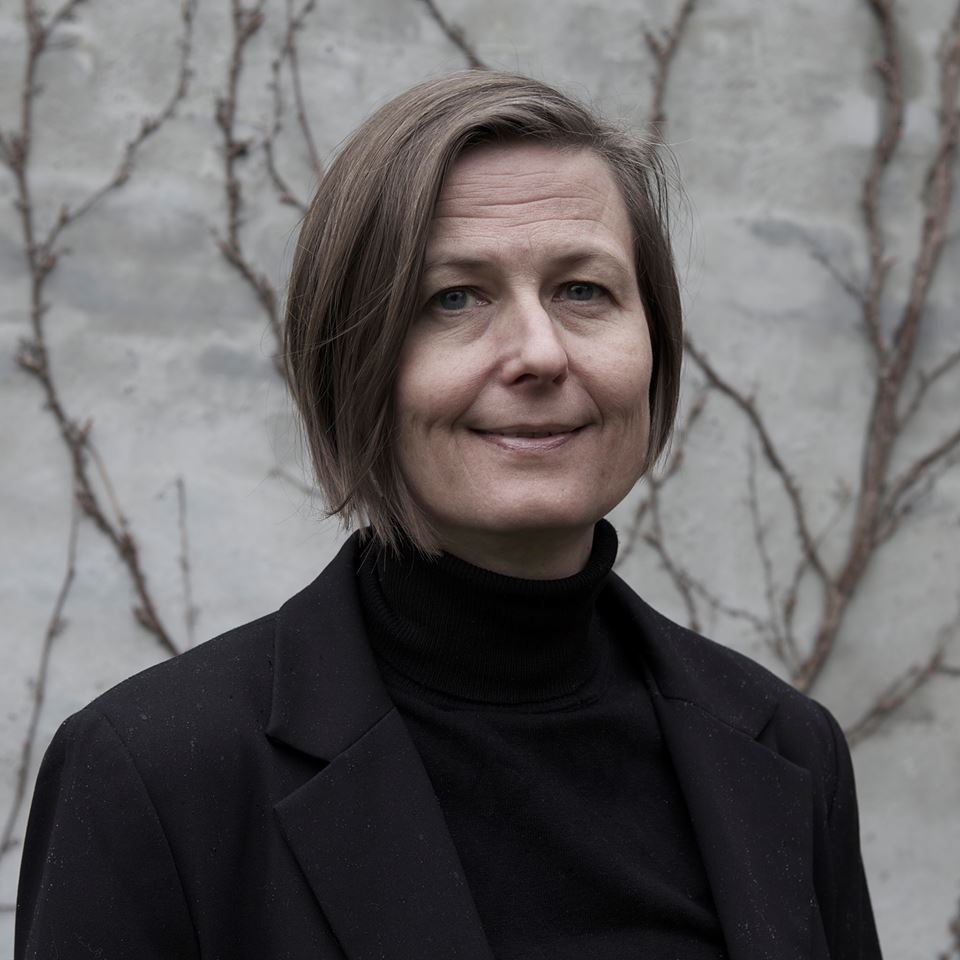
Lene Børglum, co-producer of the series

=== Casting ===
On July 22, 2022, it was revealed that Angela Bundalovic was cast in the leading role, along with Fleur Frilund, Lola Corfixen, Zlatko Burić, Andreas Lykke Jørgensen, Jason Hendil-Forssell, Li Ii Zhang, Dragana Milutinović, Mikael Bertelsen, Mads Brügger, Ramadan Huseini, and Per Thiim Thim.

=== Filming ===
It was revealed that the principal photography of the series had already begun in Copenhagen, Denmark since 2021 through Refn's social media accounts. It wrapped on early April 2022, according to NWR's socials. Magnus Nordenhof Jønck was director of photography. Series editors were revealed on September 4, 2022, with Matthew Newman, Olivier Bugge Coutté, Olivia Neergaard-Holm, Allan Funch joining the post-production team. Danish musicians, Peter Peter and Peter Kyed, reunited with Refn, having previously scored his earlier films, including the Pusher trilogy and Valhalla Rising.

== Controversy ==
=== Animal abuse allegations ===
PETA filed a complaint on December 9, 2021, accusing Copenhagen Cowboy production team of killing pigs during the filming process. It was revealed that they had a farmer that supplied pigs for the series, who in turn witnessed a pig shot and killed specifically for a scene. The death was confirmed by a Copenhagen Zoo correspondent and therefore brought an investigation by Danish police. PETA sent a letter to Reed Hastings, requesting the production team to cut a scene where the pigs are shot on the set.

== Release ==
Copenhagen Cowboy had its world premiere at the 79th Venice International Film Festival, on September 9, 2022. The series was released on the platform on January 5, 2023.

The first trailer of the series was released on YouTube on September 4, 2022, and the second followed on November 23, 2022.

A making-of documentary titled Copenhagen Cowboy: Nightcall with Nicolas Winding Refn arrived on Netflix on January 31, 2023. In the documentary, Refn said:

I am a very superstitious person, and I have contacts with extraterrestrials through my work that I regularly speak with. So it was very natural for me to bring that into the process. I always knew that the Miu character and her so-called sister, Rakel, would essentially come from another dimension. I just had to figure out how I interpreted it into the story.

== Critical reception ==
On Rotten Tomatoes, the first season holds an approval rating of 68% based on 31 reviews, with an average rating of 6.5/10. The website's critical consensus reads, "Beautiful and mystifying as an art installation, Copenhagen Cowboy follows in Nicolas Winding Refn's polarizing tradition of glacially-paced crime thrillers that exude stylish cool." On Metacritic the series received a score of 63 out of 100 based on 11 critics, indicating “generally favourable reviews.”

Jonathon Wilson of Ready Steady Cut gave the series 4/5 stars, praising Bundalovic's performance and the direction, writing "...in the limitless potential of its ideas and the striking strangeness of its execution, it'll live in the memories of everyone who watches it." Jasper Rees of The Daily Telegraph gave the series 3/5 stars, praising Bundalovic's performance, although criticizing its plot and direction, writing"It has no idea how to end other than to shrug and raise a single, massively irritating digit in the direction of the viewer." Charles Bramesco of The Guardian gave the series 3/5 stars, praising its cinematography, score, and symbolism while also criticizing its writing and direction, writing "Refn delivers something we’ve never seen before only after spending hours on more of the same, a slog leavened by scant enjoyments." Angie Han of The Hollywood Reporter similarly praised the cinematography while criticizing its plot, writing, "the project feels less like an intricately plotted Marvel blockbuster than some half-forgotten fairy tale."

Brian Tallerico from RogerEbert.com gave the series 2/4 stars, writing that "Most of the ideas in Copenhagen Cowboy are underdeveloped, and Refn is repeating more than he is reinventing." Rafaela Sales Ross of The Playlist gave the series a C+ grade, saying "[I]f one is ever so inclined to indulge the filmmaker's predilection for the self-congratulatory, then Copenhagen Cowboy will work a treat. If the opposite is true, then buckle up, as this is about to be one wild yet extremely unpleasant ride." Austen Goslin of Polygon wrote, "Refn misses about as often as he hits in Copenhagen Cowboy — even if a few of those hits are home runs." Steph Green of Sight & Sound shared a similar opinion, writing, "Copenhagen Cowboy will be manna for those partial to Refn's acidic, arcane films ... it's an overly languid journey, however visually striking it may be."
