= Pusher (film series) =

Danish film trilogy

- Directed by: Nicolas Winding Refn; Assad Raja (2010 remake); Luis Prieto (2012 remake)
- Written by: Nicolas Winding Refn (1–3); Jens Dahl (1); Assad Raja (2010 remake); Matthew Read (2012 remake)
- Starring: Kim Bodnia; Mads Mikkelsen; Zlatko Burić; Richard Coyle
- Music by: Peter Peter
- Release dates: 30 August 1996 (Pusher); 25 December 2004 (Pusher II); 22 August 2005 (Pusher 3)
- Country: Denmark
- Languages: Danish; Hindi (2010 remake); English (2012 remake)

The Pusher film trilogy by the Danish film director Nicolas Winding Refn illustrates and explores the violent criminal underworld of Copenhagen in gritty realism. Each film is led by a different lead character; Frank (Kim Bodnia), a mid-level drug dealer in the first, his friend and associate Tonny (Mads Mikkelsen), in the second, and their boss Milo (Zlatko Burić), a Serbian gang leader, in the third. Milo is the only character to appear in all three films, with Burić also reprising his role in the British 2012 remake.

== Films ==
=== Original series ===
==== Pusher (1996) ====
The first film follows Frank for a week, a mid-level drug dealer who becomes indebted to his supplier, Milo. It depicts his depravity and how his actions force him further and further out on thin ice while revealing the bittersweet relationship he has with his girlfriend, Vic.

The film was a success, not only in Denmark, but internationally, and launched Refn's, Bodnia's and Mads Mikkelsen's careers.

==== Pusher II (2004) ====
The second film follows Frank's low-level criminal sidekick, Tonny. It illustrates how Tonny is rooted in a spiral of crime and drugs, his relationship towards his notorious, cynical father and how he adapts to the consequence of becoming a father himself. According to film critic Robert Abele of the Los Angeles Times "in Refn's skilled street-realist hands, the child becomes a potent, wailing metaphor for Tonny's own dilemma of rudderless need".

==== Pusher 3 (2005) ====
The third film depicts a day in the life of Serbian drug lord Milo. Milo, who was a feared and respected man in the first two films, has since aged. He does not have the same grip on the underworld that he used to and is now slowly losing the battle against a younger generation of immigrants, who now want a piece of the action. The film shows Milo's downfall and his desperate attempt to reclaim the throne.

=== Remakes ===
==== Pusher (2010) ====
A Hindi remake of the same name, starring, written and directed by Assad Raja, was released in 2010.

==== Pusher (2012) ====
An English-language remake of the same name, starring Richard Coyle, was released in 2012, with Zlatko Burić reprising his role as Milo from the original trilogy.

== Main characters ==
List indicators
- A dark gray cell indicates that the character was not in the film or that the character's presence in the film has yet to be announced.
- An ^{A} indicates an appearance through archival footage or stills.
- A ^{C} indicates a cameo role.
- A ^{U} indicates an uncredited role.

Character	Original series			Remakes	
Character	Pusher	Pusher II: With Blood on My Hands	Pusher 3: I'm the Angel of Death	Pusher	Pusher
Character	1996	2004	2005	2010	2012
Milo	Zlatko Burić	Zlatko Burić	Zlatko Burić		Zlatko Burić
Tonny / Tony	Mads Mikkelsen	Mads Mikkelsen			Bronson Webb
Radovan / Hakan	Slavko Labović		Slavko Labović		Mem Ferda
Branko (Vanja)	Vasilije Bojičić (as Vanja Bajičić)	Vasilije Bojičić	Vasilije Bojičić (as Vanja Bajičić)		
Mike	Levino Jensen		Levino Jensen		
Frank / Salim	Kim Bodnia			Assad Raja	Richard Coyle
Vic / Flo	Laura Drasbæk				Agyness Deyn
Brian / Fitz	Nicolas Winding Refn				Paul Kaye
Hasse	Peter Andersson				
Rita	Lisbeth Rasmussen				
Drug addict	Thomas Bo Larsen				
Officer	Lars Bom				
Scorpion	Gordon Kennedy				
Mikkel	Jesper Lohmann				
Kurt the Cunt		Kurt Nielsen	Kurt Nielsen		
Red (Røde)		Karsten Schrøder	Karsten Schrøder		
Muhammed		Ilyas Agac	Ilyas Agac		
Jeanette		Linse Kessler	Linse Kessler		
Smeden / The Duke		Leif Sylvester			
Charlotte		Anne Sørensen			
Ø		Øyvind Hagen-Traberg			
Gry		Maria Erwolter			
Svend		Sven Erik Eskeland Larsen			
Prostitute #1		Maya Ababadjani			
Milena			Marinela Dekić		
Luan			Kujtim Loki		
Rexho			Ramadan Hyseni		
Ali			Hakan Turan		

- Pusher: Frank (Kim Bodnia), a mid-level drug dealer.
- Pusher, Pusher II: Tonny (Mads Mikkelsen), Frank's troubled and impulsive punk rock friend.
- Pusher, Pusher II, Pusher 3: Milo (Zlatko Burić), a Serbo-Danish gang leader, ruler of the Copenhagen underworld, and the only character to appear in all three films. Burić also reprises his role in the 2012 English language remake.

== Reception ==
The films hold respective scores of 83%, 100% and 93% on Rotten Tomatoes. Writing for The New York Times, critic Nathan Lee said of the trilogy: "From the mean streets of Copenhagen—they evidently exist—comes the Pusher trilogy, a pungent dose of Denmark rot. Written and directed by Nicolas Winding Refn, this tough trio of underworld thrillers sticks so close to its rogues' gallery of gangsters, suckers and murderous megalomaniacs that you can almost taste the hate and smell the stomach wounds. Given an appetite for grisly crime flicks, they make for a delectably nasty epic".
