= Pusher II =

- Theatrical poster
- Directed by: Nicolas Winding Refn
- Written by: Nicolas Winding Refn
- Produced by: Nicolas Winding Refn; Johnny Andersen; Henrik Danstrup
- Starring: Mads Mikkelsen; Leif Sylvester; Zlatko Burić
- Cinematography: Morten Søborg
- Edited by: Janus Billeskov Jansen; Anne Østerud
- Music by: Peter Peter; Peter Kyed; Povl Kristian (Theme)
- Production companies: Billy's People; Nordisk Film
- Distributed by: Nordisk Film; Magnolia Pictures
- Release date: 25 December 2004
- Running time: 100 minutes
- Country: Denmark
- Language: Danish

Pusher II (also known as Pusher II: With Blood on My Hands) is a 2004 Danish crime film written and directed by Nicolas Winding Refn. It is the second film in the Pusher trilogy, portraying the lives of criminals in Copenhagen.

== Plot ==
Before he is released from prison, Tonny hears a monologue by his cellmate advising him to conquer his fear. He reminds Tonny of a monetary debt he owes but chooses to give him a way out, out of respect for his father, a vicious gangster known as the Duke. Upon his release, Tonny visits his father's garage business seeking employment. The Duke has a younger son from a different mother now and receives Tonny coldly, but he ultimately allows Tonny to work for him on a trial basis. Tonny steals a Ferrari in an effort to impress his father, but the car is rejected and the Duke berates Tonny for his irresponsibility.

While hanging out with his friend Ø, Tonny is told that he has a child with a local woman named Charlotte. Charlotte, who has been raising the child by herself, demands that Tonny start paying her child support. Tonny makes empty promises to pay, but soon comes to care for the child. He successfully participates in a car heist for the Duke, but has to ride in the trunk of the getaway car because there are no seats left.

Tonny visits a local pimp, Kurt the Cunt, when he is buying heroin with Milo, a Serbian drug lord. When one of Milo's thugs arrives later, Kurt thinks it is the police coming in and flushes the heroin down the toilet. Kurt now has no money or drugs to sell and cannot pay back the money he borrowed for the deal. He convinces Tonny to help buy him a gun and shoot him in the arm to convince Kurt's financial backer that he was robbed. While visiting with Charlotte and his son, Tonny learns how to change his son's diaper. Ø watches and reveals that he is about to marry his girlfriend Gry and have a child of his own.

At Ø's wedding reception, the Duke delivers a toast telling Ø that he thinks of him as a son, while chiding Tonny. Tonny gets drunk and becomes angry as he watches Charlotte neglecting their child to snort cocaine with Gry in the club's kitchen. Tonny insists that she take the baby home, but she refuses and berates him. Enraged, Tonny chokes Charlotte and is pulled away by several men. He leaves the party and meets Kurt, who is lingering outside.

Kurt convinces Tonny to help him smash up his apartment to further support their cover story. In return, Kurt promises to put in a good word for Tonny with the Duke. Kurt attacks a sex worker who emerges from his bedroom and tells Tonny he has to kill her to make the break-in even more convincing. Tonny wants no part of it. Kurt reveals that his backer is the Duke and that he has lied so that Tonny will share in Kurt's debt.

Tonny visits his father to find a way to reconcile and pay off the debt. He volunteers to intimidate the Duke's ex-wife Jeanette, who is trying to take custody of his half-brother. The Duke is hesitant, but Tonny's uncle Red vouches for him because he did well during the car heist. The Duke insists that Tonny kill Jeanette, and he agrees. Tonny visits Jeanette at her workplace, Kurt's brothel, but cannot go through with the murder. After returning and admitting his failure to his father, the Duke berates him. Tonny snaps and attacks his father with a screwdriver, stabbing him to death in a frenzied fit of rage.

He flees and goes looking for Ø, but instead finds Gry and Charlotte getting high. They deride Tonny and leave the baby unattended. Tonny takes the child and gets on a bus, fleeing the city.

== Cast ==
- Mads Mikkelsen as Tonny: A troubled hoodlum.
- Leif Sylvester as Smeden, aka The Duke: A notorious gangster and Tonny's estranged father.
- Anne Sørensen as Charlotte: A prostitute and the mother of Tonny's child.
- Øyvind Hagen-Traberg as Ø: Tonny's friend and the Duke's trusted employee.
- Kurt Nielsen as Kurt the Cunt: An untrustworthy pimp and drug dealer.
- Karsten Schrøder as Red: The Duke's brother and partner.
- Maria Erwolter as Gry: Ø's girlfriend.
- Zlatko Burić as Milo: A Serb drug lord.
- Ilyas Agac as Muhammed: An immigrant criminal and gun dealer.
- Linse Kessler as Jeanette: A prostitute and the Duke's ex-wife.
- Sven Erik Eskeland Larsen as Svend
- Maya Ababadjani as Prostitute #1

== Production ==
=== Development ===
The original Pusher was a huge success, with director Nicolas Winding Refn having no plans to make a sequel, but after incurring a debt of 5.5 million kroner in 2003 after the artistically ambitious commercial failure Fear X, Refn decided to make a second and third in the trilogy. The screenplay was written in roughly two weeks to a month, followed shortly thereafter by the writing of Pusher 3's script.

== Reception ==
The film holds a score of 100% on Rotten Tomatoes, with an average rating of 7.7/10 based on 11 reviews from critics. Metacritic, which uses a weighted average, assigned the film a score of 78 out of 100, based on 8 critics, indicating "generally favorable" reviews.

== Soundtrack ==
Pusher II

Soundtrack album by Peter Peter and Peter Kyed
- Released: 2004
- Genre: Punk rock

The soundtrack was composed by Peter Peter, in collaboration with Peter Kyed and performed by Peter Peter's band The Bleeder Group. The soundtrack uses an updated version of the "Pusher theme" composed by Peter Peter and Povl Kristian for the first film. Nicolas Winding Refn arranged a competition, the "Pusher II Soundtrack Hunt", in collaboration with GAFFA and the website Mymusic, to find diegetic music to use in the film. Among the tracks chosen was Sad Disco by Keli Hlodversson.

== Sequel ==
Pusher II is the second film in a trilogy of Pusher films written and directed by Refn. Each film takes place in the same fictional Copenhagen underworld. The original Pusher follows Tonny's original partner Frank (Kim Bodnia), and his desperate attempt to raise money after a drug deal gone wrong. Pusher II references the events of this film several times. Charlotte comments on the scars on Tonny's head, a result of the beating he received from Frank. Milo later asks Tonny if he has seen Frank lately, as Milo wanted to kill Frank at the end of Pusher. This comment reveals that Frank disappeared after the events of that film, but it's not mentioned if he fled or was killed.

The third film in the trilogy is Pusher 3, which follows the Serbian drug lord Milo as he struggles with his drug addiction, several bad drug deals, and his daughter's birthday celebration.

A Hindi remake of the first film was released in 2010, while an English language remake was released in 2012.
