= Old Men in New Cars =

- DVD front cover
- Directed by: Lasse Spang Olsen
- Written by: Anders Thomas Jensen
- Produced by: Michel Schønnemann
- Starring: Kim Bodnia; Nikolaj Lie Kaas; Tomas Villum Jensen
- Edited by: Mikkel E.G. Nielsen
- Music by: George Keller
- Distributed by: Sandrew Metronome; TLA Releasing
- Release date: 12 July 2002
- Running time: 95 min
- Country: Denmark
- Language: Danish

Old Men in New Cars (Danish: Gamle Mænd i Nye Biler), (2002) is a Danish action comedy film directed by Lasse Spang Olsen. The movie stars Kim Bodnia, Nikolaj Lie Kaas, and Tomas Villum Jensen. It is a prequel to Olsen's 1999 comedy In China They Eat Dogs.

== Synopsis ==
The last wish of the dying "Monk" is for his foster child, Harald, to find his real son, Ludvig. But Ludvig is currently in a Swedish prison cell. Peter and Martin – the two chefs – help to get him out and soon father and son meet for the first time in their lives. They get on from the word go, but now dad needs a liver transplant in Ecuador and Ludvig and Harald set about raising the wherewithal. Everything goes wrong when they try to rob a bank, though they meet Mille, who puts them onto a new trail, and Peter and Martin also make a contribution. However, soon they have the cops and the anti-terror corps on their tails.

== Cast ==
- Kim Bodnia — Harald
- Nikolaj Lie Kaas — Martin
- Tomas Villum Jensen — Peter
- Brian Patterson — Vuk
- Torkel Petersson — Ludvig
- Iben Hjejle — Mille
- Jens Okking — Munken
- Jacob Haugaard — Erling
- Slavko Labovic — Ratko
- Thomas Rode Andersen — Dan Hansen
