= Pusher 3 =

- Theatrical poster
- Directed by: Nicolas Winding Refn
- Written by: Nicolas Winding Refn
- Produced by: Johnny Andersen; Henrik Danstrup; Mikkel Berg; Kim Magnusson; Kenneth D. Plummer; Rupert Preston
- Starring: Zlatko Burić; Marinela Dekić; Slavko Labović; Ilyas Agac
- Cinematography: Morten Søborg
- Edited by: Miriam Nørgaard; Anne Østerud
- Music by: Peter Peter; Peter Kyed; Povl Kristian (Theme); The Texas Chainsaw Orchestra (additional music)
- Production companies: Danish Film Institute; Nordisk Film; TV2 Danmark; Pusher III Ltd.; NWR Film Productions
- Distributed by: Nordisk Film
- Release date: 22 August 2005 (Copenhagen International Film Festival)
- Running time: 108 minutes
- Country: Denmark
- Languages: Danish; Serbian; English; Polish; Albanian

Pusher 3 (also known as Pusher III: I'm the Angel of Death) is a 2005 Danish crime film written and directed by Nicolas Winding Refn. It is the third and final installment of the Pusher trilogy. A Hindi remake of the first film was then released in 2010, with an English-language remake following in 2012, with Zlatko Burić reprising his role.

== Plot ==
Milo, an aging Serbian drug lord, attends a meeting of Narcotics Anonymous. The five-days-clean Milo admits that he is worried that the stress of cooking for his daughter's 25th birthday party will cause him to relapse into using. He departs the meeting to pick up a drug shipment with his henchman Branko. Though he requested heroin, the shipment turns out to be 10,000 ecstasy pills. Seeking an explanation, Milo meets with his Albanian supplier Luan. The Albanians agree to send a new shipment of heroin and allow Milo to try to sell the ecstasy as well.

After a quick talk with his demanding and spoiled daughter, Milena, Milo goes back to the kitchen at his club to cook for the party. After he forces his henchmen to try his cooking, he meets his associate Little Muhammed, who has come to drop off his daily haul. The pugnacious Muhammed warns Milo to respect younger hoods like himself, calling himself "King of Copenhagen", but Milo mockingly calls him the "King Kong of Copenhagen". As Milo knows nothing about ecstasy, however, he needs Muhammed to set up a buyer for the pills. When all of his henchmen get food poisoning from his cooking, Milo has no choice but to trust Muhammed to make the sale alone and return within an hour.

During the party, Milo splits his time between mingling with guests, cooking and trying to contact the tardy Muhammed. While buying wine at an underground store, he learns that Milena's boyfriend, Mike, is in fact a drug dealer. He forces Mike to accept him as his sole supplier, and then haggles with Milena over the price. While waiting in a restaurant for an emergency supply of fish, Milo bumps into Kurt the Cunt, a low-level drug dealer who gives him some heroin. The over-stressed Milo breaks down and smokes some of it. Having not heard from Muhammed in four hours, he contacts a corrupt cop who promises to find him.

When Milo meets with Luan to admit that he lost the ecstasy and needs more time to pay for them, the Albanians force Milo into a partnership to settle the issue. Using his kitchen as a meeting place, Rexho, an Albanian crook, and a Polish pimp arrive to sell a young girl into prostitution. Milo tries to distance himself from the transaction in disgust, but Rexho treats him as a subordinate, demanding that he serve them with food and drink, and the pimp tricks Milo into snorting an amphetamine type stimulant as a prank.

Rexho and the pimp attempt to sell the girl to Jeanette, a local brothel operator, but she refuses to take her, sensing she is likely underage. Milo gives the girl a piece of his daughter's birthday cake after she reveals that it is her birthday as well. After Rexho leaves, the girl attempts to flee, but Milo helps run her down. The furious pimp pours boiling water on the girl's hand, which ultimately sends Milo over the edge. In a rage he beats the pimp to death with a hammer. He allows the girl to flee, then waits for Rexho to return and kills him as well. The corrupt cop delivers Muhammed to Milo in the trunk of his car, warning him not to hurt him.

Milo seeks help from his old friend and ex-henchman Radovan, who left the underworld to start a successful Kebab restaurant. Radovan agrees to help Milo one last time. He tortures Muhammed, who claims that the ecstasy pills Milo had received were just candy. They don't believe him, but are convinced when Muhammed allows them to feed him a bag of the "pills", with no effect on his mental state. Milo admits that he was wrong, but Muhammed threatens him. Enraged, Milo locks Muhammed in a freezer with Radovan's help. They then butcher the two corpses for disposal.

At dawn, Milo returns to his tranquil home and talks with Milena. She wonders why he disappeared during the party, then goes to bed. Milo walks into the backyard and silently smokes a cigarette while looking into his empty swimming pool.

== Cast ==
- Zlatko Burić as Milo: A middle-aged Serbian drug lord.
- Marinela Dekić as Milena: Milo's strong-willed daughter.
- Ilyas Agac as Muhammed: An ambitious young drug-dealer.
- Vasilije Bojičić as Branko: Milo's henchman.
- Kujtim Loki as Luan: Milo's Albanian drug supplier.
- Ramadan Hyseni as Rexho: A weaselly Albanian gangster and Luan's interpreter.
- Levino Jensen as Mike: Milena's boyfriend. Mike was one of the bodybuilders Frank robbed in the first film.
- Linse Kessler as Jeanette: A brothel operator. Jeanette was the ex-wife of The Duke from the second film, and previously a prostitute in the brothel when it was run by Kurt the Cunt.
- Slavko Labović as Radovan: Milo's old friend and former henchman.
- Kurt Nielsen as Kurt the Cunt: A particularly loathsome drug dealer and pimp.
- Hakan Turan as Ali: Little Mohammed's partner.
- Karsten Schrøder as Red (Røde): Tonny's uncle, Smeden's brother and former partner. Following Smeden's death in the second film he and several associates of Smeden now works with Milo.

== Critical response ==
The film was critically acclaimed. On the review aggregator website Rotten Tomatoes, 93% of 15 critics' reviews are positive, with an average rating of 7.9/10. Metacritic, which uses a weighted average, assigned the film a score of 72 out of 100, based on 10 critics, indicating "generally favorable" reviews.

== Trilogy and remakes ==
Pusher 3 is the final film in Pusher trilogy. The previous two films take place in the same fictional Copenhagen underworld. The first film, Pusher followed Frank (Kim Bodnia), a mid-level drug dealer who becomes indebted to Milo in a similar way that Milo later becomes indebted to the Albanians. Radovan appears in this first film as Milo's most trusted enforcer and admits to a desire to leave the underworld and open a restaurant, his dream having come true in Pusher 3. Milena's boyfriend Mike also appears as a drug-dealing bodybuilder who is robbed by Frank. Branko also appears as one of Milo's other henchmen.

The second film, Pusher II, follows Frank's estranged partner Tonny (Mads Mikkelsen) as he struggles with his relationship with his father and the prospect of becoming a father himself. Milo, Muhammed, and Jeanette appear in this film, and Kurt the Cunt has a larger role as Tonny's untrustworthy friend and the initial operator of the brothel which Jeanette will be in charge of in Pusher 3.

Two remakes additionally followed: a Hindi remake of the first film released in 2010, and an English-language remake of the first film in 2012, with Zlatko Burić reprising his role.
