= Space Rocket Nation =

Danish film company

- Industry: Motion Picture
- Founded: 2008
- Headquarters: Copenhagen, Denmark
- Key people: Lene Børglum and Nicolas Winding Refn
- Products: Film, Television
- Number of employees: 1
- Website: www.spacerocketnation.com

Space Rocket Nation is a Danish film production company founded in 2008 by producer Lene Børglum and director Nicolas Winding Refn after their collaboration on Refn's film Valhalla Rising.

== Productions ==
- Nuka Eskimo Diva (2012) (documentary) by Lene Stæhr
- Tabu (2012) (short fiction) by Bo Mikkelsen
- Only God Forgives (2013) by Nicolas Winding Refn
- My Life Directed by Nicolas Winding Refn (2014) (documentary) by Liv Corfixen
- The Neon Demon (2016) by Nicolas Winding Refn
- Too Old to Die Young (2019) by Nicolas Winding Refn and Ed Brubaker
- Into the Darkness (2020) by Anders Refn
