= In China They Eat Dogs =

1999 film

- Directed by: Lasse Spang Olsen
- Written by: Anders Thomas Jensen
- Produced by: Steen Herdel
- Starring: Kim Bodnia; Dejan Čukić; Nikolaj Lie Kaas; Tomas Villum Jensen
- Edited by: Lasse Spang Olsen
- Music by: George Keller
- Distributed by: Scanbox; TLA Releasing
- Release date: 10 September 1999
- Running time: 91 minutes
- Country: Denmark
- Languages: Danish; Serbian; English; German

In China They Eat Dogs (Danish: I Kina spiser de hunde) is a 1999 Danish action comedy film directed by Lasse Spang Olsen, and starring Kim Bodnia, and Dejan Čukić.

== Plot ==
Arvid (Dejan Čukić), a bank teller, is constantly harassed by people he meets and looked down on by his girlfriend Hanna for being too boring and dull. Hoping to put some excitement in his life, Arvid helps stop a robbery at the bank. However, Hanna doesn't believe he was involved and dumps him, taking the majority of their shared possessions with her. At the same time, Astrid, the wife of the would-be bank robber, Franz, tracks Arvid down and tells him her husband was robbing the bank only so he could pay for medical treatments so they could have a child.

Feeling guilty, Arvid gets in touch with his brother Harald (Kim Bodnia), whom he hasn't seen in years after their father disowned him for his criminal ties, about robbing a van carrying money to the bank. The heist is successful and Arvid delivers the money to Astrid, but is sickened by the overly violent manner in which Harald and his associates execute it. Things further fall apart, after breaking Franz out of jail, a physical altercation breaks out, resulting in the death of their driver Vuk.

Franz tells the brothers that Astrid is actually his sister, and has been avoiding her ever since she conned him out of some money. Harald kills him over this, but they discover that Astrid has fled to South Africa to escape their wrath. Arvid attempts to distance himself from Harald to avoid further violence, but is accosted by Hanna at his apartment attempting to claim ownership of the rest of his things. Finally reaching his breaking point, Arvid kills Hanna and meets up with Harald so they can chase Astrid down.

Needing money to get to South Africa, the brothers attempt to rob the bank Arvid works at, but are attacked by the local Serbian cartel in retaliation for the death Vuk who was related to the cartel's head, Ratko. They manage to kill him and his men, but Arvid is killed in the process. As Harald and their associates grieve, Arvid's spirit is greeted in limbo by an angel named Richard, who had been relaying Arvid's misadventures to a demonic bartender. Arvid is surprisingly allowed into Heaven because his deceased father has fixed it with Richard, while the other victims of the shootout are sent to Hell: a barfly named Jørgen (the result of Jørgen attempting to hustle Richard and the bartender out of money at poker), Arvid's closeted co-worker Finn (simply for being gay), and his 'girlfriend' Olga (the result of a clerical error on Richard's part).

== Prequel ==
In 2002 a prequel titled Old Men in New Cars was released. It was again directed by Lasse Spang Olsen, and had Kim Bodnia reprising his role as Harald.
