= Bleeder (film) =

1999 film

- DVD cover
- Directed by: Nicolas Winding Refn
- Written by: Nicolas Winding Refn
- Produced by: Nicolas Winding Refn; Henrik Danstrup; Thomas Falck
- Starring: Kim Bodnia; Mads Mikkelsen; Zlatko Buric; Liv Corfixen
- Cinematography: Morten Søborg
- Edited by: Anne Østerud
- Music by: Peter Peter; Peter Kyed; Povl Kristian
- Production company: Kamikaze
- Distributed by: Scanbox Entertainment
- Release date: 6 August 1999
- Running time: 97 minutes
- Country: Denmark
- Language: Danish

Bleeder is a 1999 Danish crime drama film written and directed by Nicolas Winding Refn. The film was successful in Denmark, but did not live up to the success of Refn's previous film Pusher.

Despite recasting several actors from Pusher, Bleeder is not a sequel. The film tells the story of Leo, who descends into desperation and violence after his girlfriend becomes pregnant.

== Plot ==
Leo and Lenny are two friends living in Nørrebro, Copenhagen. Leo lives in a rundown apartment with his girlfriend Louise. Lenny is a shy film expert who works at a video store run by the immigrant Kitjo, selling arthouse and pornographic films.

When Louise becomes pregnant and wants to keep the baby, Leo becomes increasingly aggressive. He and Louise's brother Louis witness a beating at a club. Lenny is trying to date Lea, a girl who works in a local grill bar. After a few casual encounters, she agrees to go to the cinema with him. Lenny shows up at the cinema, but is unable to approach her, and leaves again.

Leo, Lenny, Kitjo and Louis meet up to watch movies together. At a brief visit to a drug store, Louis turns out to have an aggressive racist attitude. Louis and Leo argue afterwards.

In despair, Leo hits Louise and is threatened by Louis. At another movie night, Leo pulls out a gun and threatens Louis. Leo berates Lenny for his lifestyle and expresses his disdain for his own life, feeling trapped in a dead end. Leo hits Louise again, making her lose the baby. Louis takes a gruesome revenge by injecting HIV infected blood into Leo's body. He retaliates in an equally gruesome manner, shooting Louis before shooting his own hand and letting his blood drip onto Louis to also give him HIV, and then commits suicide.

Kitjo brings Lenny to Leo's funeral, but Lenny cannot bring himself to go. Afterwards, Lenny seeks up Lea again. He asks Lea out a second time; she is hesitant, but agrees.

== Cast ==
Bleeder features a relatively small ensemble cast, and most of the actors, except Corfixen and Andersson, previously starred in Refn's debut film Pusher. Jensen only had a small role in Pusher; his role in Bleeder is more developed.

- Kim Bodnia – Leo
- Mads Mikkelsen – Lenny
- Rikke Louise Andersson – Louise
- Levino Jensen – Louis
- Liv Corfixen – Lea
- Zlatko Burić – Kitjo
- Claus Flygare – Joe
- Marko Zecewic – Marko
- Gordana Radosavljevic – Mika
- Dusan Zecewic – Dusan
- Ole Abildgaard – Video shop customer
- Karsten Schrøder – Røde
- Sven Erik Eskeland Larsen – Svend

== Soundtrack ==
Bleeder

Soundtrack album by various artists
- Released: 1999
- Genre: Punk rock

Music is used heavily throughout the entire film. The soundtrack features many Danish artists, including Peter Peter, Jesper Binzer, Lovebites and Düreforsög.

== Reception ==
The film received generally positive reviews at its premiere at the Venice Film Festival, but faded into obscurity shortly thereafter due to Kamikaze, the film's production company, going out of business. Colin Kennedy of Empire magazine gave the film 2 out of 5 stars, describing it as lacking "both the power and punch" of Refn's previous film Pusher. Kennedy also criticized theme of vengeance as "wholly predictable", and described the B-plot involving the video store clerk as amounting to padding the runtime.
