= Taxa (TV series) =

Danish drama television series

- Genre: Drama
- Starring: Pernille Højmark; Zlatko Burić; Pia Vieth; Jesper Lohmann; Leif Sylvester; Peter Gantzler; John Hahn-Petersen
- Country of origin: Denmark
- Original language: Danish
- No. of seasons: 5
- No. of episodes: 56

Production
- Producer: Rumle Hammerich Sven Clausen

Original release
- Network: DR1
- Release: 14 September 1997 – 12 December 1999

Taxa is a Danish television drama in 56 episodes, written by Stig Thorsboe and produced by Rumle Hammerich for the Danish Broadcasting Corporation.

The series started on 14 September 1997 on DR1. It was broadcast during the period 1997-1999 for a total of five seasons. Taxa was also screened in Sweden on SVT1.

== Plot ==
The series revolves around a small taxi central, CrownTaxi, in Copenhagen. CrownTaxi has its ups and downs and in the course of the series, following the various drivers, radio operator Lizzie and boss Verner Boye-Larsen. They all have their problems both with clients and family life and constantly threaten the show's villain Hermann from the competing taxi firm, City Car, who wants to take over CrownTaxi.

== Cast ==
| Actor | Character |
|---|---|
| Pernille Højmark | Lotte Nielsen |
| Zlatko Burić | Meho Selimoviz |
| Pia Vieth | Birgit Boye-Larsen |
| Jesper Lohmann | Finn Johansen |
| Leif Sylvester | Tom Lund |
| Peter Gantzler | Mike Engholm |
| John Hahn-Petersen | Verner Boye-Larsen |
| Margrethe Koytu | Lizzie Boye-Larsen |
| Anders W. Berthelsen | René Boye-Larsen |
| Peter Mygind | Andreas Lund-Andersen |
| Helene Egelund | Gitte |
| Trine Dyrholm | Stine Jensen |
| Laura Christensen | Fie Nielsen |
| Torben Jensen | Herman |
| Ann Eleonora Jørgensen | Nina Boye-Larsen |
| Jens Jørn Spottag | Peter |
| Caroline Drasbæk | Mai |
| Lars Knutzon | Bentzon |
| Claus Bue | Kurt |
| Tammi Øst | Dr. Mette Sandbæk |
| Vibeke Ankjær | Louise Hald |
| Søren Spanning | Claus Skovgaard |
| Solbjørg Højfeldt | Eva Henningsen |
| Sidse Babett Knudsen | Milla |
