= Angela Bundalovic =

Danish actress (born 1995)

Angela Bundalovic (born 1995) is a Danish-Serbian actress. She is best known for her role as Beatrice in the Netflix television series The Rain (2018), Nadja in Limboland (2020), Miu in Copenhagen Cowboy (2022), and Ida in Copenhagen Does Not Exist (2023). She won the Lecce European Film Festival Best European Actor/Actress award in 2023.

== Life and career ==
Angela Bundalovic studied dance and choreography at the Danish National School of Performing Arts (Den Danske Scenekunstskole).

She made her screen acting debut as Dommeren's daughter in the film Dark Horse, which was screened in the Un Certain Regard section at the 2005 Cannes Film Festival. Her next film role was as the seven-year-old Sidsel in the 2006 short film Blood Sisters. In 2018, she played Beatrice in the first season of the Netflix series The Rain.

Bundalovic returned to the stage during the 2018/2019 season as a dancer in Frédéric Geis's Uranus and in Ingri Fiksdal's Shadows of Tomorrow. Bundalovic plays the junkie Nadja in the 2020 Danish television series Limboland.

In 2022, Bundalovic took the lead role in the Nicolas Winding Refn supernatural crime series Copenhagen Cowboy. The series was released on Netflix in 2023.

In 2023, she played the lead role in the Martin Skovbjerg Jensen-directed film Copenhagen Does Not Exist. Bundalovic won the Best European Actor/Actress award at the Lecce European Film Festival for her performance.

== Filmography ==
=== Film ===
List of film appearances, with year, title, and role shown
Year	Title	Role	Notes
2005	Dark Horse	Dommeren's daughter	
2006	Blood Sisters	Sidsel	Short
2023	Copenhagen Does Not Exist	Ida	

=== Television ===
List of television appearances, with year, title, and role shown
Year	Title	Role	Notes
2018	The Rain	Beatrice	7 episodes
2020	Limboland	Nadja	8 episodes
2022	Copenhagen Cowboy	Miu	6 episodes

=== Music videos ===
List of music videos appearances, with year, title, and role shown
Year	Artist	Title	Role	Notes
2019	FRAADS	"Blinker"	Main female	"Blinker" music video by FRAADS
2021	Dizzy Mizz Lizzy	"Amelia"	Amelia	"Amelia" music video by Dizzy Mizz Lizzy
2024	Metronomy + Naima Bock + Joshua Idehen	"With Balance"	Main female	"With Balance" music video by Metronomy

== Awards ==
Year	Award	Category	Work	Result	Ref
2023	Lecce European Film Festival	Best European Actor/Actress	Copenhagen Does Not Exist	Won	
