= Pernille Højmark =

Danish actress (born 1960)

- Born: 21 May 1960 (age 66); Copenhagen, Denmark
- Citizenship: Danish
- Occupation: Actress
- Years active: 1985-present

Pernille Højmark (born 21 May 1960) is a Danish actress. She has appeared in more than thirty films since 1985.

== Filmography ==
Film
Year	Title	Role	Notes
1990	Sirup		
2001	Shake It All About		
2004	Strings		voice only

TV
Year	Title	Role	Notes
1994–1997	Taxa (TV series)	Lotte Nielsen	
2004–2007	Krøniken	Karen Jensen	
