= Liv Corfixen =

Danish actress and documentary filmmaker

- Born: 13 January 1973 (age 53); Denmark
- Occupations: Actress, film director
- Notable work: My Life Directed by Nicolas Winding Refn
- Spouse: Nicolas Winding Refn (m. 2007; div. 2023)
- Children: 2
- Parent(s): Teit Jørgensen; Lizzie Corfixen

Liv Corfixen (born 13 January 1973) is a Danish actress and documentary filmmaker.

== Career ==
Corfixen worked as an actress in Denmark, appearing in a small roles in Susanne Bier's The One and Only and her husband Nicolas Winding Refn's films Pusher, Bleeder, and Fear X. While Refn was filming Only God Forgives, Corfixen and their children moved to Bangkok for six months to accompany him. While her husband was working and their daughters were in school, she began filming a behind-the-scenes look at Refn and his filmmaking process. The film was released as My Life Directed by Nicolas Winding Refn, which premiered at the 2014 Fantastic Fest and Beyond Fest. Through it, she explores the relationship between her and her husband, who happens to be a movie director. The documentary has received positive reviews from both events.

== Personal life ==
Corfixen is the daughter of cinematographer Teit Jørgensen. She was married to director Nicolas Winding Refn. Together they have two daughters.
