= Zlatko Burić =

Danish-Yugoslav actor

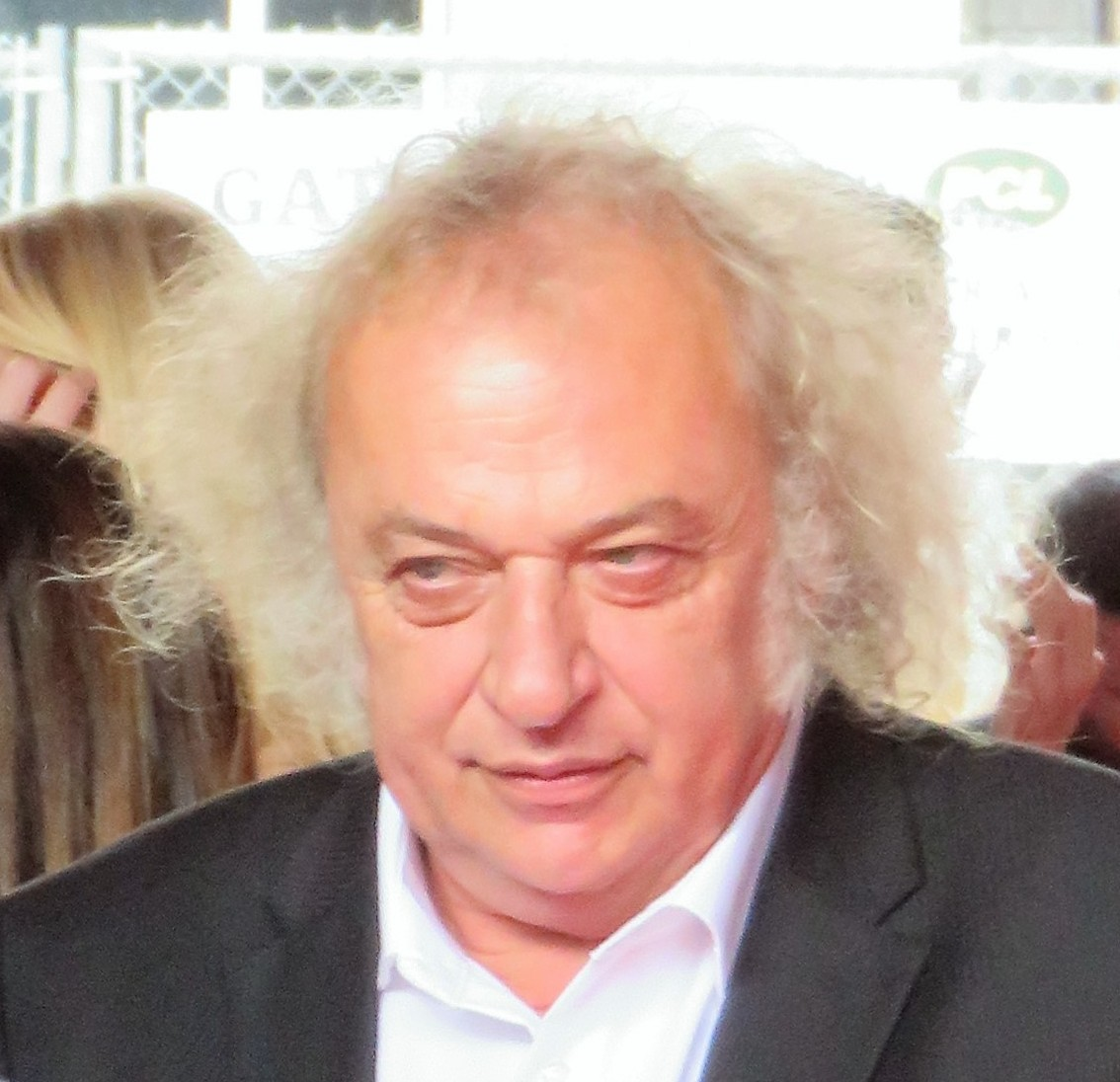
- Burić at the 2018 Toronto International Film Festival
- Born: Osijek, PR Croatia, Yugoslavia (now Croatia)
- Occupation: Actor
- Years active: 1981–present
- Spouse(s): Sonja Hindkjær (m. 1981, divorced) Dragana Milutinović (m. 1998)
- Children: 3

Zlatko Burić is a Croatian and Danish actor. He is best known for his performances in the Pusher film trilogy (1996–2005), and the films Bleeder (1999), 2012 (2009), Triangle of Sadness (2022), Superman (2025), and The Bride! (2026). In television, he portrayed Von Kovak in Wonder Man (2026). For Triangle of Sadness, he won a European Film Award and a Guldbagge Award.

== Early life and education ==
Burić was born in the city of Osijek in the former Yugoslavia (now located in Croatia) where he was educated at the Dramski Studio in 1972.

== Career ==
In the 1970s and early 1980s, Burić belonged to the experimental theater group Kugla Glumište (formed in 1975) together with Željko Zorica-Šiš and Damir Bartol-Indoš.

He has appeared in several successful Danish films from the 1990s and 2000s, frequently appearing in films directed by Nicolas Winding Refn, including Bleeder and Milo in The Pusher Trilogy. For his role in Pusher, he won the Bodil Award for Best Supporting Actor in 1997.

In 2009, Burić had a large supporting role in the apocalyptic film 2012, as Yuri Karpov, a Russian billionaire. In 2012, he reprised his role as Milo in the British remake of Pusher.

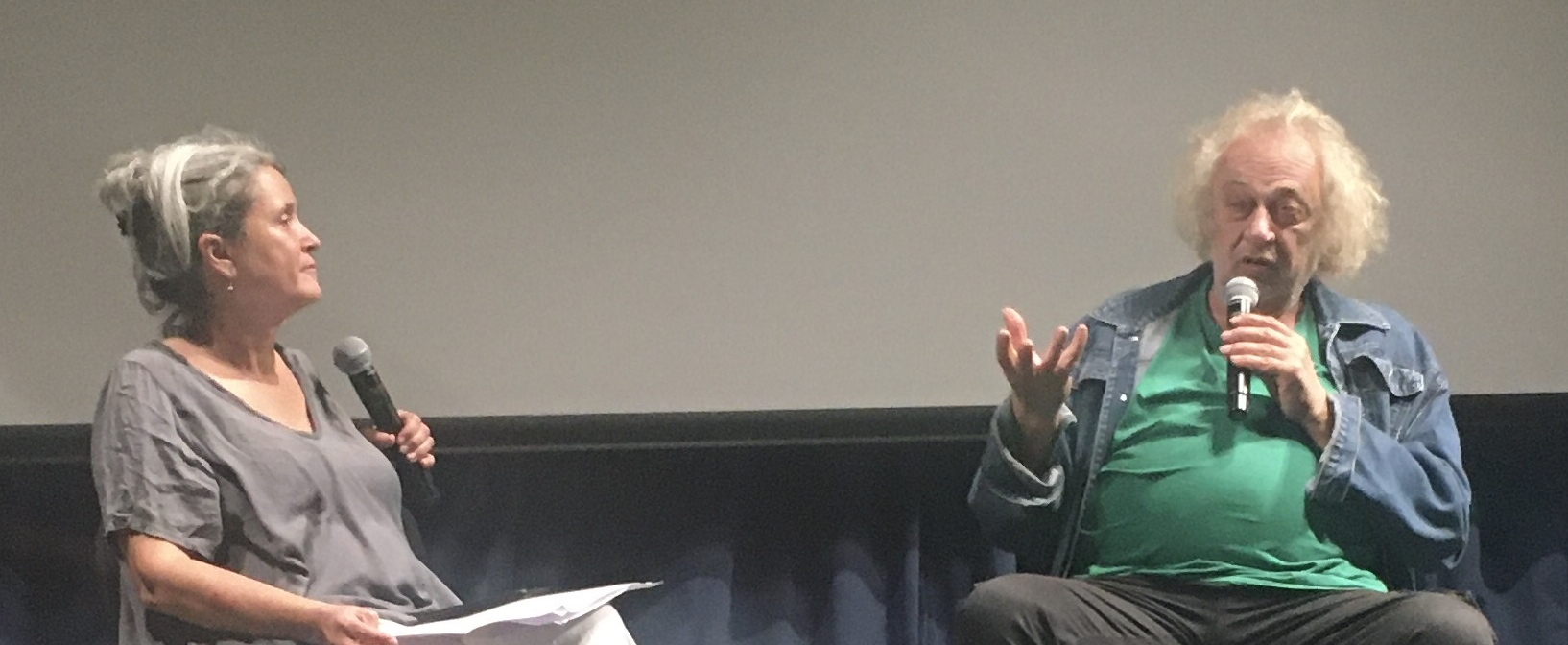
Burić on Kugla Glumište, talk in Zadar, 2023

== Personal life ==
Burić moved to Denmark in 1981 where he married Sonja Hindkjær, with whom he has three children. After their divorce, he married the Danish-Serbian actress Dragana Milutinović, on 7 October 1998.

== Filmography ==
=== Film ===
Year	Film	Role	Notes
1996	Pusher	Milo	Bodil Award for Best Actor in a Supporting Role
1997	Sinan's Wedding	Sinan's father	
1998	Baby Doom	Lazlo	
1998	Angel of the Night	Taxi driver	
1999	Bleeder	Kitjo	
1999	Tsatsiki, morsan och polisen	Tsatsiki's dad	Voice
2000	Help! I'm a Fish	Bus driver	Voice
2001	Meningen med Flemming	Thomas	
2001	Woyzecks sidste symfoni	Woyzeck Lotzki	
2001	Shake It	Taxi driver	
2002	One Hell of a Christmas	Ibrahim	
2002	Dirty Pretty Things	Ivan	
2003	Kærlighed ved første hik 3 – Anja efter Viktor	Tattoo Mogens	
2003	Covac	The scientist	
2004	Pusher II	Milo	
2005	Restless Souls	Drago	
2005	Pusher III	Milo	
2007	Pistoleros	Ivan	
2008	Milo's Wheels	Goran	
2008	Himmerland	Stipe	
2009	2012	Yuri Karpov	
2012	Pusher	Milo	English-language remake
2012	St George's Day	Vladimir Sukhov	
2014	Kolbøttefabrikken	Omar	
2015	Min søsters børn og guldgraverne	Fred	
2015	Iqbal & den hemmelige opskrift	Baba Ganus	
2016	Quit Staring at My Plate	Lazo	
2016	Iqbal & superchippen	Baba Ganus	
2017	Alle for tre	Signor Pelliccia	
2018	Teen Spirit	Vladimir Brajković	
2018	Comic Sans	Bruno	
2018	Kursk	Kulkin	
2018	Iqbal & den indiske juvel	Baba Ganus	
2019	Killerman	Perico	
2019	Extracurricular	Drago	
2021	Mayday	Max "The Cook"	
2022	Triangle of Sadness	Dmitry	European Film Award for Best Actor; Guldbagge Award for Best Actor in a Supporting Role
2023	Bosnian Pot	Zdenek	
2023	Good Times, Bad Times	Kuhar	
2024	Rumours	Jonas Glob	
2024	Wolfs	Dimitri	
2025	Superman	Vasil Ghurkos	
2025	Novak	Dr. Nikola Novak	
2026	Home	Laza	
2026	The Bride!	Lupino	
2026	Bloody Tennis	Stavkos	
TBA	The Big Fix †		Filming

=== Television ===
Year	Film	Role	Notes
1981	Kugla glumiste		
1997	Karrusel	Customer	Voice; episode: "Linda og Mads" (1.1)
1997–1999	Taxa	Meho Selimoviz	56 episodes
2001	Sjätte dagen	Night manager	1 episode (2.13)
2003	Timm & Gordon	Unfaithful wife's lover	
2004	Vikaren		
2005	Omars jul	Polish Pixy	2 episodes
2006	Johanne i Troldeskoven	Troll	13 episodes
2014	1864	Ignazio	4 episodes
2018	Snatch	Beni Ladrani	1 episode
2022	Copenhagen Cowboy	Miroslav	4 episodes
2024	Jana: Marked for Life	Gavril "Baba" Bolanaki	
2024	Operation Sabre	Žarko Ilić	
2026	Wonder Man	Von Kovak	4 episodes
2026	Something Very Bad Is Going to Happen	The Witness	3 episodes
