= Slavko Labović =

Serbian-Danish actor

- Славко Лабовић
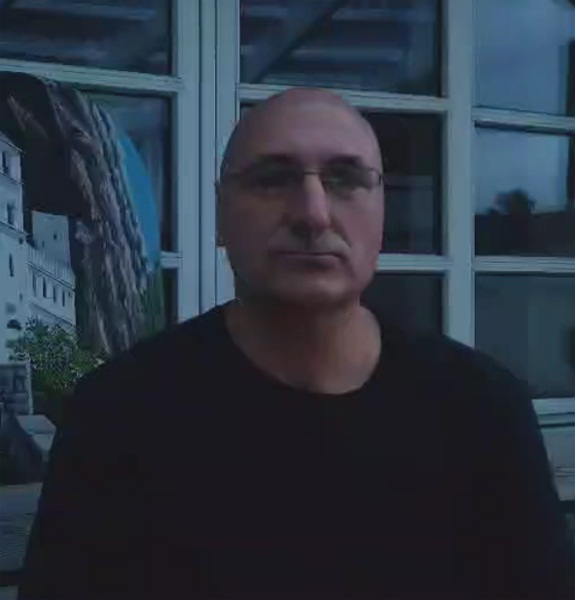
- Born: 27 November 1962 (age 62); Kolašin, PR Montenegro FPR Yugoslavia
- Occupation: Actor
- Years active: 1996–present

Slavko Labović (born 17 November 1962, Kolašin, PR Montenegro, FPR Yugoslavia) is a Serbian-Danish actor most popular for the role as a Serbian gangster in the Pusher trilogy.

Labović was born to Serbian Orthodox parents in Kolašin; he and his mother left their village, to join his father in Denmark. He came to Ballerup, Denmark as a four-year-old, together with his siblings. He made his film debut in 1996, as a gangster in Pusher, which boosted his career in Danish cinema. Slavko was, at one stage, to lead the unmade fourth Pusher film, under Winding's direction.

In 2022 he returned to work with Nicolas Winding Refn in his television series Copenhagen Cowboy.

== Family ==
Slavko has three children; he still lives in Skovlunde, where he grew up, near his family, to whom he is very close. In his spare time he is Chairman of the Parish council for the Serbian Orthodox Church in Denmark and Chairman of the Serbian Association of Denmark.

In 2001, an interview with Glas Javnosti showed his support for Radovan Karadžić when he decided to start campaigns for the protection of Karadžić. He said: "He [Karadžić] is not afraid of anybody because he has true patriots that protect him and would fight til death".

After the proclamation of Independent Kosovo in February 2008, Slavko Labovic organized a demonstration against the secession of Kosovo in front of the American embassy in Copenhagen where they gathered in 12.44 as a referring to the UN Resolution 1244. After Karadžić was captured, Slavko told the Danish newspaper Ekstra Bladet that he personally had spoken to him by phone several times and considered him a hero.

He said: "To us Serbs Karadžić is a hero. And to my best beliefs he has committed no war crimes. That's just something the United States and NATO claims. Now, I unfortunately fear that he had already been judged before he appeared in front of the tribunal in Haag".

He continued: "Karadžić is a symbol to his people. His goal and dream was that Serbs could live peacefully and quietly. He resisted that Serbs should live in Muslim territory. Therefore his arrest is a tragedy (...) The extradition of Karadžić is definitely not the wish of the people. It is high treason (...) This is one of the hardest and worst news I've had my entire life".
