= My Life Directed by Nicolas Winding Refn =

- Film poster
- Directed by: Liv Corfixen
- Written by: Liv Corfixen
- Produced by: Lene Børglum
- Cinematography: Liv Corfixen
- Edited by: Cathrine Ambus
- Music by: Cliff Martinez
- Distributed by: RADiUS-TWC
- Release date: September 20, 2014 (Fantastic Fest)
- Running time: 58 minutes
- Country: United States
- Languages: English; Danish

My Life Directed by Nicolas Winding Refn is a 2014 American documentary film written, shot, and directed by Liv Corfixen. It is about Corfixen's husband, Nicolas Winding Refn, while his action drama film, Only God Forgives (2013), is in production and released. The documentary premiered at Fantastic Fest in September 2014.

== Reception ==
On the review aggregator website Rotten Tomatoes, 61% of 23 critics' reviews are positive, with an average rating of 6.3/10. Metacritic, which uses a weighted average, assigned the film a score of 50 out of 100, based on nine critics, indicating "mixed or average" reviews.

Katie Rife of The A.V. Club gave the film a B and wrote, "My Life Directed By Nicolas Winding Refn is most compelling when Corfixen captures Refn in a private moment on the set, watching him try to keep his composure in the face of crippling anxiety so the crew doesn't lose faith in his leadership. The film also gets a lot of mileage out of juxtaposing the operatic ultra-violence inside Refn's head—'I'll kill you tomorrow and disembowel you the following day,' he deadpans to actress Kristin Scott Thomas—with his mundane family-man personal life."

Brian Tallerico of RogerEbert.com gave the film two out of four stars, writing, "I walked away from My Life Directed by Nicolas Winding Refn having enjoyed the time spent with Refn, his family, and Ryan Gosling, but without any further insight into the production of Only God Forgives, filmmaking in general or this particular talent."
