= Laura Drasbæk =

Danish actress (born 1974)

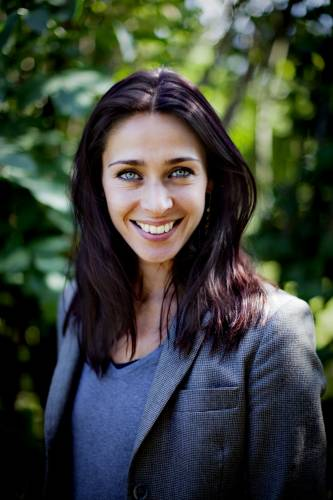
- Born: 22 December 1974 (age 51); Copenhagen, Denmark
- Occupation: Actress
- Years active: 1990-present

Laura Drasbæk (born 22 December 1974) is a Danish actress. She has appeared in more than thirty films since 1990.

== Selected filmography ==
Film
Year	Title	Role	Notes
1990	Dance of the Polar Bears		
1996	Pusher		
2002	Okay		
2005	Murk		
2007	I Was a Swiss Banker		

TV
Year	Title	Role	Notes
2002	Rejseholdet		
2009	Park Road		
2020–2024	Sommerdahl	Marianne Sommerdahl	1 – 24
