= Linse Kessler =

Danish actress and model

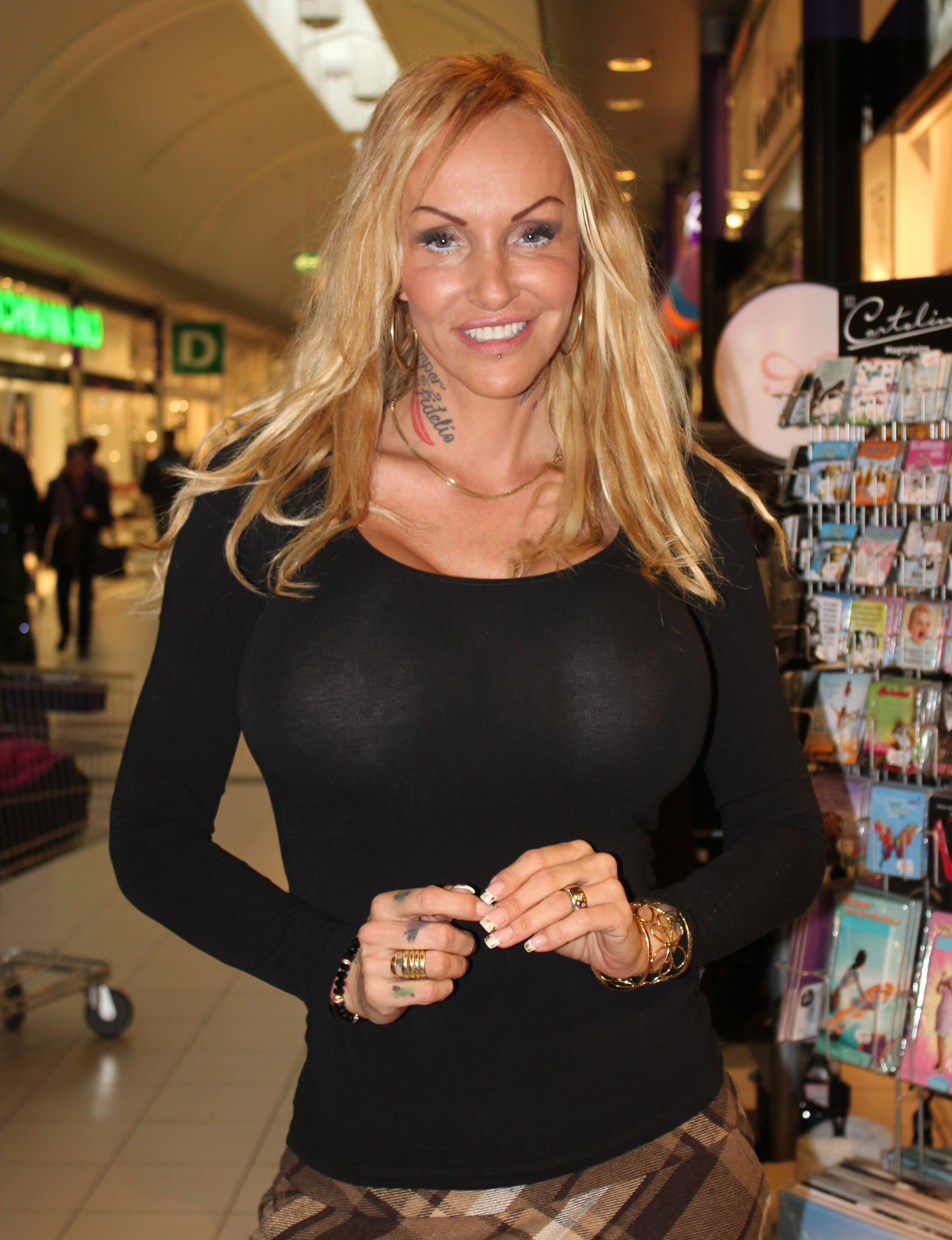
- Kessler in 2013
- Born: 31 March 1966 (age 59); Copenhagen, Denmark
- Occupations: Model, actress
- Modeling information
- Height: 5 ft 11 in (1.80 m)
- Hair color: Blonde
- Eye color: Blue

Lenina "Linse" Coleman (née Christiansen), better known as Linse Kessler (born 31 March 1966), is a Danish television personality, actress, and businesswoman. She is known for her ownership of "Scandinavia's largest silicone breasts" and for being the older sister of former professional boxer Mikkel Kessler. Linse had her own reality series, Familien fra Bryggen.

== Background ==
She was born on 31 March 1966. Her parents were typographer Ole Christansen and Ann Patricia Coleman. Her birth name was Lenina Christiansen. Officially, she was never named Linse Kessler. In 2019, she changed her name to Coleman, which was her mother's maiden name. The name change was, according to the Danish magazine B.T., to give her better business opportunities, she has now created care products.

== Career ==
Kessler gained popularity in Denmark through her acquisition of breast implants. Beginning in 1991, Kessler began getting breast augmentation surgeries. Her first set of implants augmented each of her breasts to 340cc of silicone. Kessler gradually continued to make her breasts bigger throughout the 1990s, from 340cc to 420cc, then 800cc, then 1,200cc, and finally 1,600 cc. In 1999, Kessler was featured in Extrem, a Danish TV documentary series, in which she is followed and called to have "Denmark's Largest Breasts".

In 2004, Kessler made her acting debut in a Danish mainstream crime film, Pusher II: With Blood on My Hands. In the film, Kessler plays a minor role as Jeanette, a gangster's ex-wife and prostitute, who is targeted for murder. In 2005, Kessler reprised her role as Jeanette in Pusher 3, in which her character is now a pimp involved in sex trafficking. In 2009, Kessler played another minor role as a seductive mistress in Nedenunder, a short film directed by Anne-Grethe Bjarup Riis.

In 2008, Kessler announced that she would be having breast reduction surgery to remove 400 cc of silicone from her implants. According to Kessler, she wanted to make her implants smaller because she retired from modeling.

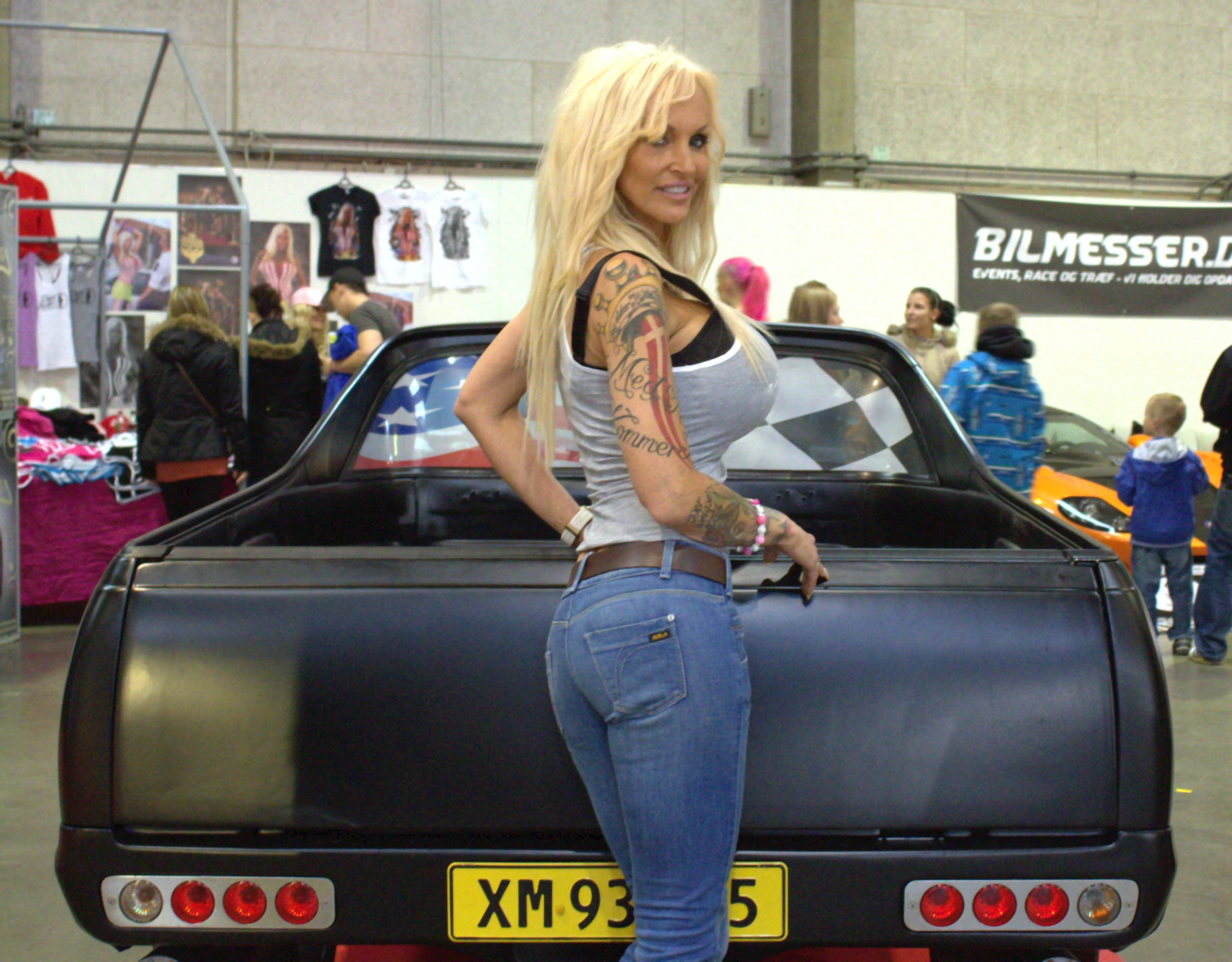
Kessler at the Fast & Furious Carshow in Fredericia, 2012.

In 2013, she appeared in the single Lidt for blond credited to Ronni Garner featuring Linse Kessler. The single charted in the Tracklisten, the official Danish Singles Chart, making it to number 17 in its first week of release.

=== Television career ===
Familien fra Bryggen

In September 2011, Kessler and her family began starring on a reality television show titled Familien fra Bryggen on the Danish TV3 channel. The show followed the daily lives of Kessler, her daughter Stephanie, her mother Ann, and her boxer brother Mikkel in their home in the Islands Brygge section of Copenhagen.

Others

In January 2012, Kessler guest-starred on Paradise Hotel. In August 2012, Kessler began starring on Gustav og Linse på udebane, in which she travels the world with her co-host Gustav Salinas.

== Personal life ==
Kessler used to own the Copenhagen Redlight strip club in the Nyhavn district of Copenhagen. She opened a tattoo salon called Artistico in 2014, which was later sold. Kessler has had several run-ins with the law; she was convicted of drug charges, threats against witnesses, and assault. She has served time at Horserød camp and Vestre Fængsel prison.

== Discography ==
=== Singles ===
| Year | Single | Peak positions | Album |
| Year | Single | DEN | Album |
|---|---|---|---|
| 2014 | "Stop the Killing" | 12 | |

Featured in

| Year | Single | Peak positions | Album |
| Year | Single | DEN | Album |
|---|---|---|---|
| 2013 | "Lidt for blond" (Ronni Garner featuring Linse Kessler) | 17 | |
| 2013 | "Julesangen" (Ronni Garner featuring Linse Kessler) | 20 | |
