= Mona Masri =

Swedish journalist, critic, and radio show host

Mona Masri (born January 16, 1985) is a Swedish-Lebanese journalist, critic and the host of radio show OBS i P1 on Sveriges Radio. She is also a literary critic on Sveriges Television, and used to write about art and culture in Dagens Nyheter. Masri is a member of the board of directors of the Swedish Publicists' Association.
