= Kim Bodnia =

Danish actor (born 1965)

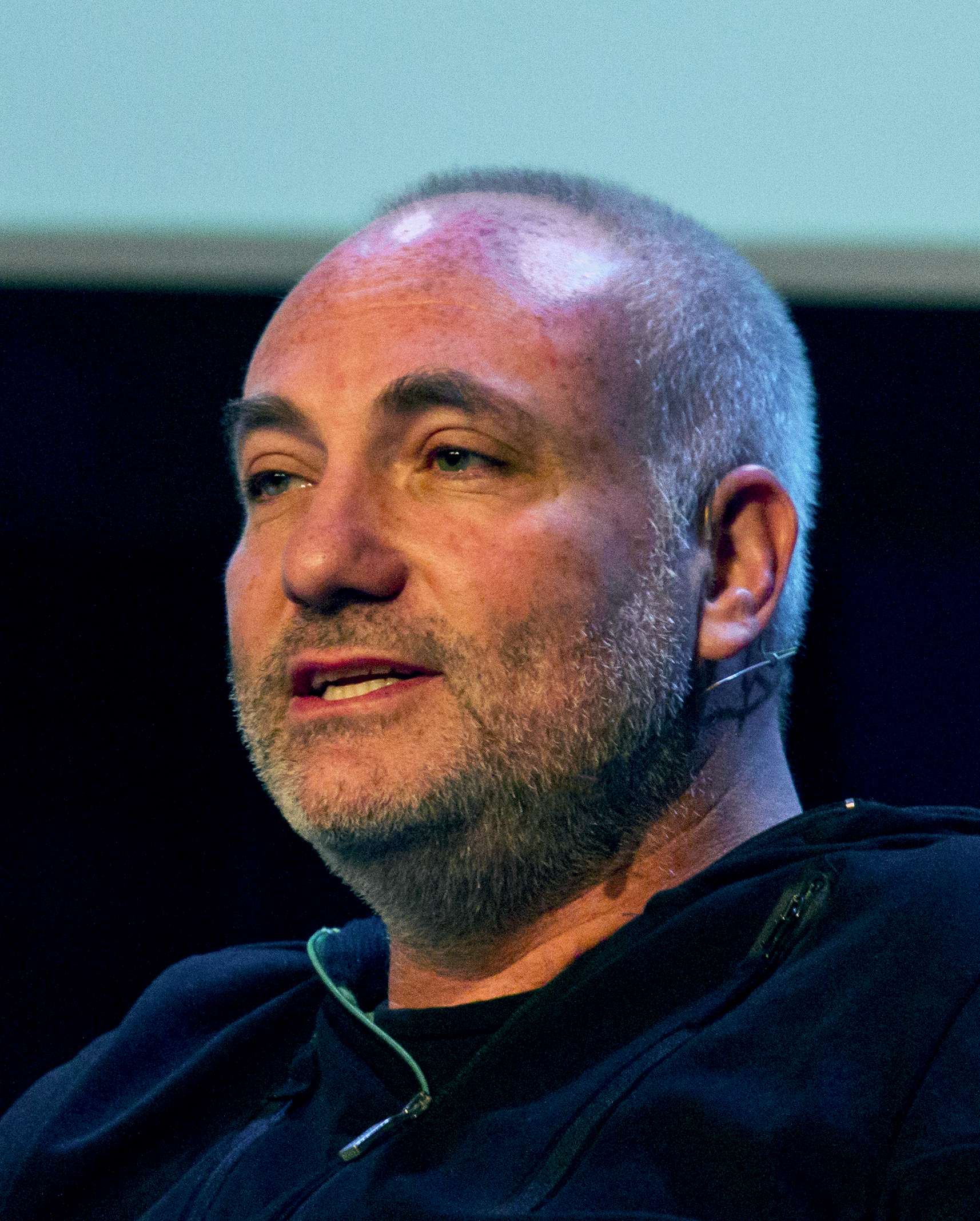
- Bodnia in 2012
- Born: 12 April 1965 (age 61); Copenhagen, Denmark
- Occupation: Actor
- Years active: 1989–present
- Spouses: Lotte Andersen (divorced); Rikke Louise Andersson
- Children: 4
- Website: bodnia.dk/en/

Kim Bodnia (born 12 April 1965) is a Danish actor. He became widely known for his role as police detective Martin Rohde in the Scandinavian crime drama series The Bridge (2011-2014). He is also known internationally for his lead role as drug dealer Frank in Nicolas Winding Refn's 1996 directorial debut Pusher, and as Konstantin in the spy thriller TV series Killing Eve (2018–2022).

Amongst his award wins and nominations, he is the recipient of two Robert Awards for Best Supporting Actor in Nightwatch (1994) and Best Leading TV Actor in The Bridge. The latter also earned him a Golden Nymph Award for Outstanding Actor in a Drama Series at the Monte-Carlo Television Festival. In 2009, Bodnia won the Bodil Award for Best Actor in a Supporting Role for the film Terribly Happy (2008), and in 2019, he received a British Academy Television Award for Best Supporting Actor nomination for his role in Killing Eve.

== Early life ==
Bodnia was born in Copenhagen on 12 April 1965 and grew up in Espergærde. He comes from a Jewish family with Polish and Russian ancestry. In 2014, he described himself as "half-Russian, half-Polish and all Jewish". When asked in 2011 whether religion had been an important aspect of his life, he said, "No, but I believe in nature."

Bodnia admitted that he was not a particularly good student as a child, describing himself as a "clown" who was reluctant to study. His main interest was in athletics, particularly the 100 metres and the long jump, in which he was the Zealand youth champion for several years. He aspired to become a football goalkeeper, but a foot injury prevented him from pursuing this career.

As a student at Espergærde Ungdomsskole, Bodnia joined the theatre group, performing mainly in comic roles. When he was 16, his mother suggested he apply for a place at the Danish National School of Theatre and Contemporary Dance. His first application failed, but he gained entry on his second attempt a year later in 1987.

== Career ==
In his film debut An Abyss of Freedom (En Afgrund af frihed; 1989) he played a small supporting role as a bouncer. One of his first roles after graduation in 1991 was as Patrick Bateman in a stage version of American Psycho, and he was subsequently often typecast as violent, brutal characters. Bodnia's first leading role in a film was in Bulldozer (1993), directed by Maria Sødahl. His breakout role came a year later in Ole Bornedal's horror film Nightwatch (1994).

Despite this success, it was two years before his next film, Nicolas Winding Refn's Pusher (1996), and then Winding Refn's Bleeder (1999). He has since appeared in Terribly Happy (2008), and in three Lasse Spang Olsen films: In China They Eat Dogs (1999) and its sequel Old Men in New Cars (2002), and in Den gode strømer (2004), which he co-wrote with the director. Bodnia has also appeared in several Norwegian films, including Himmelfall (2002), Monstertorsdag (2004), and Tomme Tønner (2010). He appeared in the 2011 Indian English comedy film Delhi Belly playing a Russian smuggler. In 2014, he appeared as the eponymous Iranian interrogator Rosewater, directed by Jon Stewart. Of his role he said, "It was a tough job because I'm Jewish. I'm playing a guy who really hates me and wants to destroy my country."

Bodnia has become internationally known for his television roles. He made his first appearance in the historical mini-series Snapphanar in 2006. He appeared in three episodes of the first season of the crime series The Killing (2007) (Danish: Forbrydelsen), and in two episodes of the comedy drama Hvor fanden er Herning? ("Where the hell is Herning?") (2009), before returning to crime series, appearing in episodes of the Swedish Inspector Winter (2010), Those Who Kill (Den som dræber; 2011), and the German/Swedish Der Kommissar und das Meer ("The Inspector and the Sea"; 2012).

In 2009, he won the 62nd Bodil Award for Best Actor in a Supporting Role. In 2014 he won the Monte-Carlo Television Festival Award for Outstanding Actor in a Drama Series.

Bodnia played the Danish detective Martin Rohde in the first two series of the Nordic noir crime television programme The Bridge (Broen|Bron) (2011–present). Created and written by Hans Rosenfeldt, it is a joint creative and financed production between Sweden's Sveriges Television and Denmark's DR. It has been shown in over 100 countries. Although Bodnia signed for the third series, he dropped out, reportedly unhappy with the development of his character. He also voiced concerns in an interview about working in Malmö, due to the city's problems with anti-semitism, which had made his decision to leave the series easier. "It's not very nice and comfortable to be there as a Jewish person," he said at the time.

In early 2014, Bodnia directed readings of The Tailor's Tale, a play based on his Jewish grandfather's experience of life in Copenhagen under Nazi occupation, written by his cousin Alexander Bodin Saphir, and performed at the Scandinavia House – The Nordic Center in America in New York.

In 2025, Bodnia appeared in Formula One-themed drama F1, directed by Joseph Kosinski. He portrayed APXGP team principal Kaspar Smolinski. In the ensemble cast, Bodnia appears alongside Brad Pitt, Javier Bardem and Kerry Condon, among others.

== Personal life ==
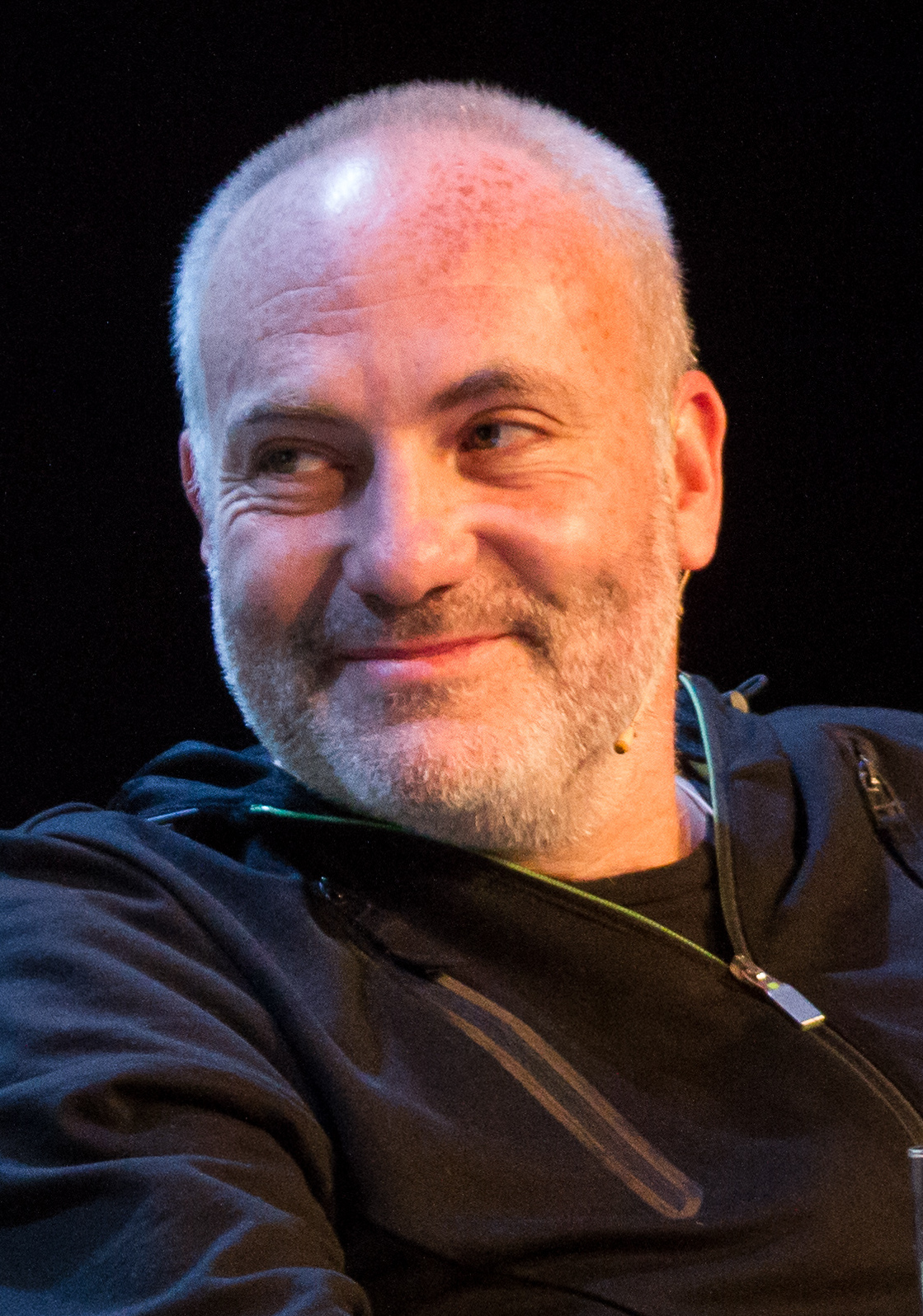
Bodnia in 2012

Bodnia has been married twice. His first marriage was to actress Lotte Andersen, with whom he has a son, Louis Bodnia Andersen, who is also an actor and who played a younger him in Killing Eve. He is married to actress Rikke Louise Andersson, who played his wife in Bleeder. They have two sons and a daughter.

== Filmography ==
=== Film ===
Year	Film	Role	Notes
1989	En Afgrund Af Frihed	Bouncer	
1993	Bulldozer	Samson	
1994	Nattevagten	Jens	
1996	Pusher	Frank	
1997	Den Sidste Viking	Sigbard	
1999	Bleeder	Leo	
1999	In China They Eat Dogs	Harald	
2001	Øyenstikker	Eddie	
2002	Old Men in New Cars: In China They Eat Dogs II	Harald	
2002	Himmelfall	Johannes	
2004	Den Gode Strømer	Jens	Also co-writer
2004	Monstertorsdag	Skip	
2004	Inkasso	Claus	
2005	Opbrud	Philip	
2006	The Journals of Knud Rasmussen	Peter Freuchen	
2007	Ekko	Simon	
2008	Nefarious	Elkiar	
2008	Terribly Happy	Jørgen Buhl	
2008	Kandidaten	Claes Kiehlert	
2009	Vølvens forbandelse	Harald Blåtand	
2009	The Christmas Party	Buller	
2010	Caroline: Den Sidste Rejse	Johan	
2010	Tomme Tønner	Dansken	
2010	Min Bedste Fjende	Dansklærer	
2010	Hævnen	Lars	
2010	Sandheden Om Mænd	Johnny	
2011	Tomme Tønner 2 - Det Brune Gullet	Dansken	
2011	Delhi Belly (Indian film)	Vladimir Dragunsky	
2012	Caroline: Den sidste rejse	Johan	
2012	Love Is All You Need	Leif	
2012	Mamma er en superhelt	Axel	Short film
2012	Rendezvous in Kiruna	John - le biker	
2013	All for Two	William Lynge	
2013	The Shooter	Rasmus Holm Jensen	
2013	The Stranger Within	Masked Kidnapper	
2013	A Very Unsettled Summer	Alex	
2014	Serena	Abe Hermann	
2014	The Veil of Twilight	Bergtor	
2014	Rosewater	Rosewater	
2015	August	August	
2015	Far	The Father	Short film
2016	Krigarnas ö	Martin	
2017	Light Thereafter	Arnaud	
2018	The Violin Player	Björn Darren	
2019	One Day in the Life of Noah Piugattuk	The Boss	
2024	Young Woman and the Sea	Henry Ederle	
2025	F1	Kaspar Smolinski	

=== Television ===
Year	Show	Role	Platform	Notes
2011–2013	The Bridge (Broen|Bron)	Martin Rohde	SVT1 (Sweden), DR1 (Denmark)	Season 1 and 2
2011	The Killing (Danish TV series)	Bülow	Episodes 18, 19, 20	Season 1
2016	Hostages	Arthur	Channel 10 (Israel)	
2018–2022	Killing Eve	Konstantin Vasiliev	BBC America	29 episodes
2020	The Letter for the King	Abbot	Netflix	
2021	The Witcher	Vesemir	Netflix	Season 2

== Awards and nominations ==
Year	Nominee / work	Award	Result
1995	Nightwatch (1994)	Robert Award for Best Actor in a Supporting Role	Won
2000	Bleeder (1999)	Robert Award for Best Actor in a Leading Role	Nominated
2002	Dragonfly (2001)	Amanda Award for Best Leading Actor	Nominated
2003	Old Men in New Cars (2002)	Robert Award for Best Actor in a Leading Role	Nominated
2008	Echo (2007)	Bodil Award for Best Actor in a Leading Role	Nominated
2008	Echo (2007)	Robert Award for Best Actor in a Leading Role	Nominated
2009	Terribly Happy (2008)	Bodil Award for Best Actor in a Supporting Role	Won
2011	In a Better World (2010)	Bodil Award for Best Actor in a Supporting Role	Nominated
2011	Love Is All You Need (2012)	Zulu Award for Best Actor	Nominated
2012	The Bridge (2011–2018)	Golden Nymph Award for Outstanding Actor in a Drama Series	Nominated
2014	The Bridge (2011–2018)	Golden Nymph Award for Outstanding Actor in a Drama Series	Won
2014	The Bridge (2011–2018)	Robert Award for Best Actor in a Leading Television Role	Won
2014	The Bridge (2011–2018)	Zulu Award for Best Actor in a Television Role	Nominated
2019	Killing Eve (2018–2022)	BAFTA TV Award for Best Supporting Actor	Nominated
