= Nicolas Winding Refn =

Danish filmmaker (born 1970)

- Refn at the Deauville American Film Festival in 2026
- Born: 29 September 1970 (age 56); Copenhagen, Denmark
- Occupations: Film director; screenwriter; producer
- Years active: 1996–present
- Notable work: Pusher film series (1996–2005); Bleeder (1999); Bronson (2008); Drive (2011); Only God Forgives (2013); The Neon Demon (2016); Too Old to Die Young (2019)
- Spouse: Liv Corfixen (m. 2007; div. 2023)
- Children: 2
- Awards: AACTA International Award; Festival de Cannes Prix de la mise en scène FIPRESCI Prize; José Luis Guarner Critic's Award; Satellite Award

Nicolas Winding Refn (Danish: [ˈne̝kolɑs ˈve̝nte̝ŋ ˈʁæfn̩]; born 29 September 1970) is a Danish film director, screenwriter, and producer.

He directed the Pusher trilogy (1996–2005), the crime drama Bronson (2008), and the adventure film Valhalla Rising (2009). In 2011 he directed the action drama film Drive (2011) for which he won the Cannes Film Festival Award for Best Director. He was also nominated for the BAFTA Award for Best Direction. Refn's next films were the stylistically driven action film Only God Forgives (2013), the psychological horror film The Neon Demon (2016), and the science fiction thriller film Her Private Hell (2026).

In 2019, he directed his first television series, Too Old to Die Young for Amazon Prime. Refn's next project took him to Netflix, returning to his native Copenhagen for the first time since Pusher 3 to film his magical realism series, Copenhagen Cowboy. In 2008, Refn co-founded the Copenhagen-based production company Space Rocket Nation.

== Early life ==
Refn was born in Copenhagen, Denmark, and raised partly in New York City, United States. Refn's parents are Danish film director and editor Anders Refn and cinematographer Vibeke Winding. His half-brother is the musician Kasper Winding.

He attended the American Academy of Dramatic Arts but was expelled for throwing a table into a wall.

== Career ==
=== 1990s: Early career ===
Refn made his directorial debut with the Danish crime film Pusher (1996). It garnered a Best Supporting Actor Award for Zlatko Burić at the 1997 Bodil Awards.

Refn then directed Bleeder (1999), which featured much of the same cast from the Pusher Trilogy, including actors such as Kim Bodnia and Mads Mikkelsen. Refn won the FIPRESCI prize for the film at the 2000 Sarajevo Film Festival the work won Best Lighting at the Robert Festival. The film was nominated for Best Film and Best Supporting Actress at the 2000 Bodil Awards, as well as for the Grand Prix Asturias for Best Feature at the 1999 Gijón International Film Festival.

=== 2000s: Critical acclaim ===
In 2003, Refn directed and wrote his first English-language film, Fear X, which starred John Turturro and was shot in Canada. Although a financial disappointment, the Danish-Canadian production won an International Fantasy Film Award for Best Screenplay at the 2004 Fantasporto Film Festival, and was nominated for best actor awards (for Turturro) at the Bodil Awards and the Fangoria Awards, and best film awards at festivals including Sitges Film Festival and the Sochi International Film Festival.

Refn then made two sequels to Pusher, Pusher II (2004) and Pusher 3 (2005). For Pusher II, lead actor Mads Mikkelsen won a Best Actor award at the 2005 Bodil Awards, Best Actor at the 2005 Robert Festival (where the film was also nominated for Best Director, Best Screenplay and Best Film, among other nominations), and Best Actor at the 2005 Zulu Awards. The film was remade as a British version in 2012, Pusher, directed by Luis Prieto and executive produced by Refn.

In 2008, Refn returned to the European art house film circuit. He wrote and directed Bronson, which starred Tom Hardy as the title character, the U.K. prisoner Charles Bronson, noted for mental illness, violence and art. The film won Best Film at the 2009 Sydney Film Festival, and was also nominated for the Grand Jury Prize (World Cinema — Dramatic) at the 2009 Sundance Film Festival. Hardy won a Best Actor award at the 2009 British Independent Film Awards for his portrayal of Charles Bronson (and the film was nominated for a Best Achievement in Production award as well). Hardy was nominated for Best Actor by the Evening Standard British Film Awards and the London Critics Circle Film Awards.

In 2009, Refn teamed up again with frequent collaborator Mads Mikkelsen to write and direct Valhalla Rising, a surrealistic period piece about the Viking era. The film won an International Fantasy Film Special Jury Award and Special Mention at the 2010 Fantasporto Festival, and won the Titra Film Award for Refn at the 2010 Neuchatel International Fantastic Film Festival. The film also won a Best Make-Up award at the 2011 Robert Festival.

=== 2010s: Hollywood breakthrough ===
In 2011, Refn directed the American action drama film Drive (2011). It premiered in competition at the 2011 Cannes Film Festival, where he received the Best Director Award.

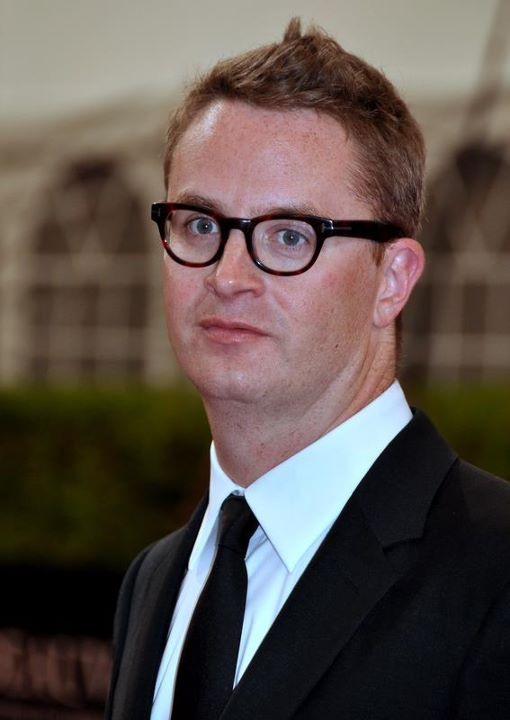
Refn promoting Drive at the Deauville American Film Festival in September 2011

The film earned Refn a BAFTA nomination for directing. The film was also nominated in 2012 for an Academy Award for Best Sound Editing, a Golden Globe Award for Best Supporting Actor - Motion Picture nomination for Albert Brooks, Excellence in Production Design Award from the Art Directors Guild, won Best Director, Best Screenplay (for Hossein Amini) and Best Supporting Actor (for Brooks) at the Austin Film Critics Awards, won Boston Society of Film Critics Awards for Best Supporting Actor (Albert Brooks) and Best Use of Music in a Film (by Cliff Martinez), the Critics Choice Award at the Broadcast Film Critics Association Awards for Best Action Movie, Best Director, Best Picture and Breakthrough Film Artist at the Central Ohio Film Critics Association, Best Original Score (Martinez) and Best Supporting Actor (Brooks) at the Chicago Film Critics Association Awards, Best Supporting Actor (Brooks) at the Florida Film Critics Circle Awards, Best Foreign Film at the Fotogramas de Plata, Best Director from the Las Vegas Film Critics Society, a Top Films Award from the National Board of Review, Best Supporting Actor (Brooks) at the National Society of Film Critics Awards, the San Francisco Film Critics Circle Awards and the New York Film Critics Circle Awards, Best Director at the San Diego Film Critics Society Awards.

The Bangkok-set crime film Only God Forgives, starring Ryan Gosling and Kristin Scott Thomas, premiered in competition at the 2013 Cannes Film Festival. The film was awarded the Sydney Film Prize at the 2013 Sydney Film Festival.

Liv Corfixen, Refn's wife, directed the documentary My Life Directed by Nicolas Winding Refn, centered on the life and work of Refn and their relationship. The documentary film premiered on 17 July 2014, in Denmark.

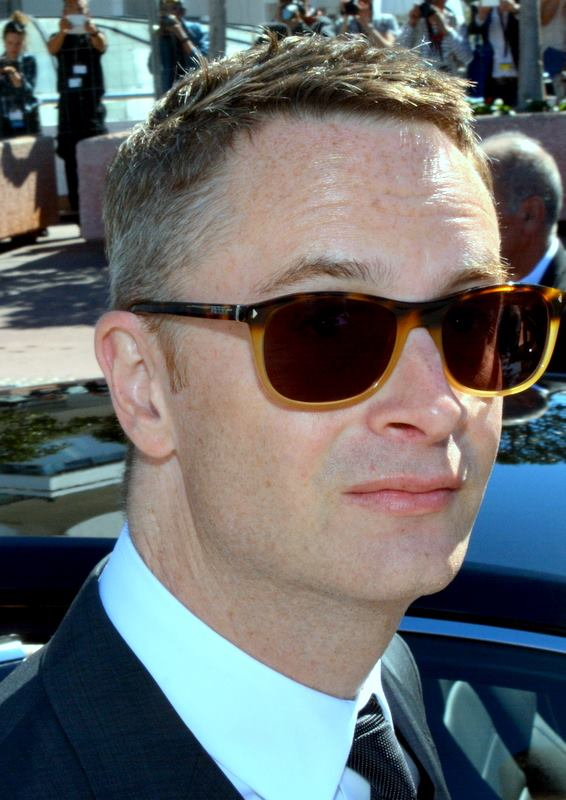
Refn at the 2016 Cannes Film Festival

In September 2011, Refn said his next film would be I Walk with the Dead, with Carey Mulligan, co-star of Drive, slated to play the lead. According to Refn, it was to be a horror-movie sex thriller that may be set in Tokyo or Los Angeles. In October 2013 playwright Polly Stenham was confirmed to write the screenplay with Refn. They stated that the film will have an all-female cast. Refn admitted that he asked Stenham to write the screenplay to compensate for his perceived inability to write female characters. By November 2014, the film had been retitled The Neon Demon, with filming planned to take place in Los Angeles in early 2015. The film starred Elle Fanning, Karl Glusman, Keanu Reeves, Christina Hendricks, Abbey Lee, Jena Malone and Bella Heathcote. The film was Refn's third consecutive in competition for the Palme d'Or.

Following The Neon Demon, Refn developed and directed the streaming television series Too Old to Die Young for Amazon in 2019 and Copenhagen Cowboy for Netflix in 2023. The latter was his first Danish-language release since the Pusher series.

=== 2020s: Recent work ===
On 23 April 2025, it was announced that Refn would write and direct a film for Neon entitled Her Private Hell, and it would star Sophie Thatcher, Charles Melton, Kristine Froseth, and Havana Rose Liu. Principal photography began on 8 May 2025 and concluded in late July. The film was released in 2026.

=== Other work: adverts, short films and teaching ===
He directed an extended Gucci commercial featuring Blake Lively and himself in a brief cameo, which premiered at the 2012 Venice Film Festival. The short film is entitled Gucci Premiere. He also directed the music video for his frequent collaborator Peter Peter's band Bleeder, which featured his wife Liv Corfixen as a crazy nurse. He also directed a series of Lincoln commercials starring Matthew McConaughey.

In 2019, Cannes Film Festival announced that it would host a masterclass with Refn on working in Film and TV.

=== Unrealized projects ===
In 2005, it was reported that Refn would co-write a screenplay with Nicholas St. John titled Billy's People. Following the box office disasters of his films Bleeder (1999) and Fear X (2003), Refn scrapped the project.

In 2009, Refn expressed high interest in developing a film biopic of notorious English occultist Aleister Crowley, with Bronson star Tom Hardy in the lead role. Refn admitted to not knowing anything about the life of the magician and referred to Crowley as a "Satan-worshipping cult personality". That year, he became attached to direct Jekyll, a modern retelling of Strange Case of Dr Jekyll and Mr Hyde with Keanu Reeves set to play the titular roles. Refn wanted the film to take place "in modern America and use as much credible science as possible." However, in February 2010, he dropped out of the project in order to work on Drive.

In 2010, Refn planned to direct Paul Schrader's script The Dying of the Light with Harrison Ford and Channing Tatum as the leads. However, in February 2010, Refn exited the project. In September 2011 during promotion for Drive, he claimed that Ford did not want his character to die, causing the film production to fall apart. Schrader directed the film, which starred Nicolas Cage and Anton Yelchin in the Ford and Tatum roles. Following its release, Refn joined with Schrader, Cage, and Yelchin in protesting the studio's final edit of the project, which was not to Schrader's original vision. Tatum originally wanted Refn to direct Magic Mike, which came to be directed by Steven Soderbergh and released in 2012. That year, Refn was attached to a remake of the 1980s crime show The Equalizer starring Denzel Washington, until the deal with Sony fell through. The adaptation The Equalizer ended up being directed by Antoine Fuqua and released in 2014.

Refn wanted to cast Drive actress Christina Hendricks as Wonder Woman, but later focused on Batgirl instead.

In July 2016, Refn revealed that he had turned down the offer to direct the James Bond movie Spectre. The following month, he announced on Twitter that his next project would be titled The Avenging Silence, calling it "Ian Fleming + William Burroughs + NWR = The Avenging Silence" and posted images for Fleming's novel Dr. No and for Burroughs's novel The Soft Machine. Producer Lene Borglum described the purported plot as: "[A] former European spy [accepts] a mission from a Japanese businessman to take down the head of a Yakuza boss in Japan".

== Directing style ==
Refn has spoken about characterization in his films:

I've always liked characters that because of the circumstances, have to transform themselves, and in the end, it's inevitable that what they end up becoming is what they were meant to be. Take, for example, Pusher II, which is a movie about a son [played by Mads Mikkelsen] who all his life wants his father's love, but realizes he needs to kill him to free the sins of the father from him. What plants the seed for him is realizing he has his own child, and the responsibility of that suddenly forces him to take action. And it's a happy ending, even though it's a dark ending, but for the character, it is what he was meant to become. It's almost like he achieved his true meaning. And Drive is similar in the sense that The Driver was meant to become a superhero, and he's denied all these things—relationships, companionship. And why would he be denied that? It was because he was meant for something greater.

Refn prefers to shoot his films in chronological order: "I read that [director John Cassavetes] had done it on some of his films, so I thought, 'That's a pretty cool approach.' And after I did it on my first movie, I felt, 'How can you do a movie any other way?' It's like a painting—you paint the movie as you go along, and I like the uncertainty of not knowing exactly how it's going to turn out." Refn spoke more about shooting in chronological order in September 2011, in reference to Drive:

It's always difficult with production. All my films previous to Drive had been shot in what I call 100-percent almost-chronological order. Where Drive is like 80 percent. The reason why it didn't go 100 was that I just simply couldn't afford the last remaining pieces. I could afford what I call the "emotional chronological order". So nobody would die or leave the movie in the middle of their shooting schedule. It would always be the end. So there was a build-up as much as possible.

On his approach to working with actors, Refn has said:

I think the first thing I ask any actor is what they would like to do, which sometimes can frighten people or can be looked upon as, 'Oh, you don't know what you want.' But I try to draw the actor in—to force them in, in some cases, because a lot of actors don't want to discuss things or go in deep; they just want to come and do the work, play their part and walk away. But for me, it doesn't work like that. You've got to get absorbed and dirty, and a way to do that is to ask the actor what they would like to do. It also forces them to be more truthful.

Refn's color blindness has influenced his style: "I can't see mid-colors. That's why all my films are very contrasted, if it were anything else I couldn't see it."

=== Influences ===
Refn has cited viewing The Texas Chain Saw Massacre (1974) as inspiration for his filmmaking career:

I grew up in a cinema family. My parents were brought up on the French New Wave. That was God to them, but to me it was the antichrist, and how better to rebel against your parents than by watching something your mother is going to hate, which were American horror movies. When I saw Texas Chain Saw Massacre, I realized: I don't want to be a director, I don't want to be a writer, I don't want to be a producer, I don't want to be a photographer, I don't want to be an editor, I don't want to be a sound man. I want to be all of them at once. And that film proved that you can do it because that movie is not a normal movie.

Refn has said numerous times that his largest cinematic influence has been the director Alejandro Jodorowsky (to whom Refn dedicated Only God Forgives), of whom he has said:

I had been seeing Jodorowsky the last couple years in Paris and we'd become quite close. Before we'd have dinner, we'd always have a tarot reading and talk about what it means. I feel that as a filmmaker, he's the last of the great giants of an era that's coming to a close. A year ago, he baptized me as his spiritual son and I wanted to reward that gesture.

He stated that for his first film Pusher, he stole everything from Gillo Pontecorvo's 1965 Oscar-nominated The Battle of Algiers and Ruggero Deodato's 1980 highly controversial film Cannibal Holocaust. Also influential to his film viewing experience were John Cassavetes' 1976 film The Killing of a Chinese Bookie and Kevin Smith's 1994 indie film Clerks.

Other favorites include Tokyo Drifter (1966), Kwaidan (1964), My Life as a Dog (1985), Man on Fire (2004), Pretty Woman (1990), Scorpio Rising (1963), Vampyr (1932), Videodrome (1983), Suspiria (1977), Cloverfield (2008), Flesh for Frankenstein (1973), Planet of the Vampires (1965), Liquid Sky (1982), The Shining (1980), Night of the Living Dead (1968), To Die For (1995), Sixteen Candles (1984), The Night of the Hunter (1955), Alien (1979) and Beauty and the Beast (1946). Some of the films Refn helped restore include Ron Ormond's The Burning Hell (1974), Curtis Harrington's Night Tide (1961) and Ray Dennis Steckler's Wild Guitar (1962).

He has also stated he is influenced by extraterrestrials. After the making of Copenhagen Cowboy, a "making-of" documentary was produced titled Copenhagen Cowboy: Nightcall with Nicolas Winding Refn, and it arrived on Netflix on 31 January 2023. In the documentary, Refn said:

I am a very superstitious person, and I have contacts with extraterrestrials through my work that I regularly speak with. So it was very natural for me to bring that into the process. I always knew that the Miu character and her so-called sister, Rakel, would essentially come from another dimension. I just had to figure out how I interpreted it into the story.

== Personal life ==
Refn married actress Liv Corfixen, and together they have two daughters, Lola and Lizzielou. The two acted alongside their mother, Liv, in Refn's 2022 short film Touch of Crude. In 2023, in the weeks between discovering that a valve in his heart was broken and the surgery that would save his life, "he made peace with his wife" and the couple split. Corfixen wrote and directed a documentary entitled My Life Directed by Nicolas Winding Refn, which chronicles the "behind the scenes" experience of shooting Only God Forgives when the entire family relocated to Thailand. The documentary has received positive reviews after premiering at Fantastic Fest and Beyond Fest. The soundtrack for the documentary is also composed entirely by Cliff Martinez, with the last track "Disconnected" composed, written and sung by Julian Winding, Refn's nephew.

After making the movie Fear X, Refn was heavily in debt. The story of his recovery is recorded in the documentary Gambler, directed by Phie Ambo.

At the 2026 Cannes Film Festival Refn revealed he temporarily died for 25 minutes and was brought back to life in 2023 saying “That changes you, when I was brought back by electricity...[n]ow that I’m alive again, I only have 25 years left of my life to live. But I’m going to make damn use of that to live life to the fullest.”

== Filmography ==
=== Film ===
Year	Title	Director	Writer	Producer
1996	Pusher	Yes	Yes	No
1999	Bleeder	Yes	Yes	Yes
2003	Fear X	Yes	Yes	No
2004	Pusher II	Yes	Yes	Yes
2005	Pusher 3	Yes	Yes	No
2008	Bronson	Yes	Yes	No
2009	Valhalla Rising	Yes	Yes	No
2011	Drive	Yes	No	No
2013	Only God Forgives	Yes	Yes	No
2016	The Neon Demon	Yes	Yes	Yes
2026	Her Private Hell	Yes	Yes	Yes

Executive producer

- Black's Game (2012)
- Pusher (2012)
- Dying of the Light (2014)

Acting roles

Year	Title	Role	Notes
1996	Pusher	Brian	
2005	Kinamand	Lægen ("The Doctor")	
2012	Pusher	Dutch Bob	
2019	Death Stranding	Heartman	Video game likeness
2025	Death Stranding 2: On the Beach	Heartman	Video game likeness

Documentary appearances

- Gambler (2006) (subject)
- Jodorowsky's Dune (2013)
- My Life Directed by Nicolas Winding Refn (2015) (subject)
- Dario Argento Panico (2023)

=== Short film ===
Year	Title	Director	Writer	Notes
2012	Gucci Première	Yes	No	
2022	Touch of Crude	Yes	Yes	
2023	Delresto	Yes	No	Segment of Circus Maximus
2024	Beauty Is Not a Sin	Yes	Yes	

=== Television ===
Year	Title	Director	Executive Producer	Writer	Creator	Notes
2009	Agatha Christie's Marple	Yes	No	No	No	Episodes "Towards Zero" and "Nemesis"
2019	Too Old to Die Young	Yes	Yes	Yes	Yes	Miniseries
2023	Copenhagen Cowboy	Yes	Yes	No	Yes	Miniseries
2023	The Famous Five	No	Yes	No	Yes	

Acting role

Year	Title	Role	Notes
2023	Copenhagen Cowboy	Jørgen	Episode "From Mr. Chiang with Love"

=== Music videos ===
Year	Title	Artist
1999	"Psycho Power"	Bleeder
2023	"Delresto (Echoes)"	Travis Scott
