= Fear X =

- The Past Can Never Be Rewound
- Directed by: Nicolas Winding Refn
- Screenplay by: Hubert Selby Jr. Nicolas Winding Refn
- Story by: Hubert Selby Jr.
- Produced by: Henrik Danstrup
- Starring: John Turturro; James Remar; Deborah Kara Unger
- Cinematography: Larry Smith
- Edited by: Anne Østerud
- Music by: Brian Eno; J. Peter Schwalm
- Distributed by: Lions Gate Entertainment
- Release date: 19 January 2003 (Sundance Film Festival)
- Running time: 91 minutes
- Countries: Denmark; United Kingdom
- Language: English
- Budget: $6.6 million

Fear X is a 2003 psychological thriller film directed by Nicolas Winding Refn in his English-language debut. The first film to be produced from one of Hubert Selby Jr.'s original screenplays, its eventual box-office failure would force Refn's production company Jang Go Star into bankruptcy. Refn's financial recovery was documented in the 2006 documentary Gambler.

== Plot ==
Harry Caine, a mall cop, obsessively investigates the murder of his pregnant wife, Claire, who was killed alongside a DEA agent at his place of work. Although Caine's co-workers sympathize with him, they express concern when he becomes aggressive with customers. Caine is tormented by inexplicable visions of his wife approaching a seemingly abandoned house in his neighborhood, which causes insomnia. The police question Caine before showing him a blurry photo of the man they claim is his wife's killer.

While combing through security footage given to him by a co-worker, Caine watches his wife's murder, and becomes convinced that the empty house contains answers. He breaks in and finds only a strip of film negatives on the bedroom floor. Upon developing the photos, he discovers that they were taken in Morristown, a small town in Montana that he visited with Claire years ago. He immediately drives there and checks into the hotel that he stayed at with Claire. He continues to have visions, this time of the elevator in his hotel. While in town, he seeks out every location shown in the photos. This leads him to a diner, where he asks a waitress about one of the women in the pictures, claiming that they have a mutual friend. He is confronted by a police officer, who intimidates him and asks why he is looking for the woman.

The cop notifies a fellow officer, Peter, of Caine's presence. Peter rushes home to check on the safety of his child. Concerned by his behavior, Peter's wife – the woman from the photo – asks what is happening. He tells her that Caine is someone who was involved in an old case and asks her to leave town with their child. He then calls his superiors and tells them that Caine is in town.

It is revealed that Peter is part of a secret organization within the police that assassinates corrupt officers across the United States. While on a mission to kill a corrupt DEA agent, Peter accidentally shot Claire, and has been haunted ever since. Peter is told that he needs to eliminate Caine. His bosses offer to kill Caine for him, but he insists on doing it himself. Caine receives a call from Peter, who claims to be able to help him find the woman in the picture. They agree to meet at the hotel. Peter arrives and lures Caine to another room and questions him. Both men are on edge. They leave the room just as Caine pieces together that Peter is his wife's killer.

Peter shoots and wounds Caine. Wracked with guilt, he hesitates before firing again, which allows Caine to run to the elevator, mirroring a vision he had earlier that day. Caine takes the elevator down and has the opportunity to get off on a lower floor, but upon seeing his own blood, flies into a rage and returns to Peter's floor, stumbling out of the elevator into complete darkness.

Caine wakes up on a hospital bed in the police station, and confesses to Peter's murder. One of the officers taking his statement is called out of the room by the cop from the diner, who tells him something that visibly frightens him. He returns to the room and informs Caine that the police found no body or evidence of any kind, then cryptically tells him that he cannot change what has already happened and must focus on the future. Caine is released, and the cop from the diner drives him to a crossroads in the middle of nowhere, providing him with a new car and all of his luggage. Caine dumps all of the photos and clues about his wife's murder on the side of the road and drives away.

During the end credits, a grid of six security camera feeds from the mall on the day of Claire's death are shown. They continually switch places. At the very end of the credits, we see a different version of the ostensibly objective security camera feed, where Peter, upon realizing that Claire has seen him murder the DEA agent, seems to kill her intentionally.

== Cast ==
- John Turturro as Harry
- Deborah Kara Unger as Kate
- Stephen McIntyre as Phil
- William Allen Young as Agent Lawrence
- Gene Davis as Ed (as Eugene M. Davis)
- Mark Houghton as Diner Cop
- Jacqueline Ramel as Claire
- James Remar as Peter
- Amanda Ooms as Prostitute

== Critical reception ==
On Rotten Tomatoes, the film has an approval rating of 56% based on reviews from 34 critics with an average score of 6.1/10. The site's consensus states: "As hazy, unsettling, and fleetingly insubstantial as a dream, Fear X will lose many viewers in its ambiguities, but is partly propped up by strong work from John Turturro." On Metacritic, the film earned a score of 61 out of 100, based on reviews from 12 critics, indicating "generally favorable reviews".

John Turturro's performance was widely praised. LA Weekly says "Turturro ... never wavers in his commitment to a role that deprives him of nearly all his actorly tools. (He) keeps Fear X fascinating." The New York Daily News says "Turturro's subtle turn keeps our emotional connection solid" and Compuserve adds "Turturro gets under your skin."

== Film ending ==
Director Nicolas Winding Refn commented on the ending within several interviews: In an interview with BBC:

- "Harry's impossible quest raises questions, but it all adds to the brave elliptical nature of this film. So did Refn ever get to the bottom of those questions in his own mind? "I can't answer that," he says bluntly. "It depends on how I feel that day. And of course that pisses off a lot of people because they're not used to a film without an ending. But what the f**k is an ending, you know?"

In an interview with IndieWire:

- "Fear X" is about idealists and when they're confronted with reality, a lot of the time their ideals are tested and turned and they're no longer what they thought they would be..."

"You can view it in many different ways... it's so up to your own interpretation."'

- "How were we going to end this, without giving anything away, without making it too obvious, because the minute the audience's mind begins to work, you're on very dangerous ground. Because if you tell them too much, they're disappointed and if you don't give them any clues, they get confused. So it's that fine line of giving the audience as they walk out, okay, I believe it's this or I believe it's that. We never gave more in the script."

Actor John Turturro also commented on the ending within an interview with Channel 4: "I liked it because the idea of the story was about a simple man thrust into this overwhelming, debilitating circumstance, and he never really finds out what happens... Nicholas doesn't have all the answers to what he's trying to do. A lot of times these guys, their biggest problem is solving the script, but Nicholas seems to be a filmmaker who likes to throw the script away."

== Festivals ==
- Sundance Film Festival
- International Film Festival Rotterdam
- Gothenburg Film Festival
- NatFilm Festival
- Cognac Film Festival
- Cannes Film Market
- Sochi International Film Festival and Awards
- Karlovy Vary Film Festival
- Melbourne International Film Festival
- L'Étrange Festival
- Filmfest Hamburg
- Sitges Film Festival
- Fantasporto Film Festival

== Awards ==
- 2003 - Sochi International Film Festival - Nominated - Golden Rose
- 2003 - Sitges - Catalan International Film Festival - Nominated - Best Film
- 2004 - Bodil Awards - Nominated - Best Actor
- 2004 - Fantasporto - Nominated - Best Film
- 2004 - Fantasporto - Won - Best Screenplay

== Production ==
The film was shot in sequence (chronological order).

=== Film Locations ===
- Polo Park, Winnipeg, Manitoba, Canada
- Prairie Production Centre, Winnipeg, Manitoba, Canada
