= Pusher (2012 film) =

- US theatrical release poster
- Directed by: Luis Prieto
- Screenplay by: Matthew Read
- Based on: Pusher by Nicolas Winding Refn; Jens Dahl
- Produced by: Rupert Preston; Felix Vossen; Christopher Simon
- Starring: Richard Coyle; Agyness Deyn; Bronson Webb; Mem Ferda; Zlatko Buric
- Cinematography: Simon Dennis
- Edited by: Kim Gaster
- Music by: Orbital
- Production companies: Vertigo Films; Embargo Films
- Distributed by: Vertigo Films
- Release dates: 21 June 2012 (Edinburgh); 26 October 2012 (United Kingdom)
- Running time: 89 minutes
- Country: United Kingdom
- Languages: English; Serbo-Croatian
- Budget: £2.3 million; ($2.7 million)
- Box office: $197,857

Pusher is a 2012 British crime thriller film directed by Luis Prieto. It is an English-language remake of Nicolas Winding Refn's 1996 film of the same name, the second remake following a 2010 Hindi remake. The film stars Richard Coyle, Agyness Deyn, Bronson Webb, and Paul Kaye.

== Plot ==
Frank is a low-level cocaine dealer in London, conducting business with his partner Tony and would-be-girlfriend Flo. When a former cellmate contacts him for a large drug deal, Frank borrows £45,000 of cocaine from Milo, a dangerous Serbian drug lord. He promises to return to Milo with the money the next day, plus £3,000 that he previously owed, but police raid the deal and Frank is forced to dump the cocaine in a duck lake. In custody, Frank is told by police that Tony has confessed to the deal, but they release him the next day. Frank quickly finds Tony and beats him savagely with a baseball bat.

Frank returns to Milo without the cash or the cocaine and requests more time to pay Milo off. Milo demands £55,000 to be paid soon. Frank scrambles to call in old debts and tries to get back in touch with Danaka, a drug mule who is scheduled to return with a half kilo of cocaine. Frank is unsuccessful and becomes increasingly on edge. Milo's henchman Hakan arrives to help Frank strongarm his debtees, but they have no success. Frank finally gets in touch with Danaka, but discovers that the cocaine pack she brought back is worthless. Frank becomes desperate and robs a high-class drug party, but is still far short of the required sum.

Milo's patience runs out and Frank is brought back to him. With only a few thousand pounds to his name Frank begs for more time, but Milo begins to torture him instead. Frank manages to escape and returns to Flo, asking her if she wants to run away with him to Spain using the funds he has gathered up. As Frank makes a few final arrangements, Milo calls and says that their feud has become too costly and will therefore accept a token payment to resolve it. Milo and his henchmen, however, are actually planning to kill Frank when he arrives.

Frank brusquely tells Flo that their plans are called off and laughs at the thought of them running away together. Heartbroken, Flo steals all of Frank's remaining cash and escapes in a taxi. Frank catches up to the taxi and the two stare tearfully at each other through the closed car window as the film ends.

== Cast ==
- Richard Coyle as Frank, a mid-level drug-dealer, who works in the London underworld.
- Agyness Deyn as Flo, Frank's girlfriend
- Bronson Webb as Tony, Frank's cheerful partner
- Mem Ferda as Hakan, Milo's enforcer
- Zlatko Burić as Milo, a powerful Serbian drug lord. Burić is the only actor from the original film to reprise his role.
- Paul Kaye as Fitz, one of Frank's customers
- Shend as Meten, a nasty piece of work

== Soundtrack ==
The film's score is provided by British electronic band Orbital.

== Reception ==
Pusher received mixed reviews. On Rotten Tomatoes, the film received a 47% score, based on 49 critics, with an average rating of 5.4/10. Metacritic gives the film a weighted average score of 52% based on reviews from 19 critics, indicating "mixed or average reviews".
