= Pusher (1996 film) =

- Theatrical poster
- Directed by: Nicolas Winding Refn
- Screenplay by: Jens Dahl; Nicolas Winding Refn
- Story by: Nicolas Winding Refn
- Produced by: Henrik Danstrup
- Starring: Kim Bodnia; Zlatko Burić; Laura Drasbæk; Slavko Labović; Mads Mikkelsen; Vanja Bajičić; Peter Andersson
- Cinematography: Morten Søborg
- Edited by: Anne Østerud
- Music by: Povl Kristian; Peter Peter
- Production company: Balboa Entertainment
- Distributed by: RCV Film Distribution
- Release date: 30 August 1996
- Running time: 105 minutes
- Country: Denmark
- Languages: Danish; Swedish; Serbian
- Budget: DKK 6 million

Pusher is a 1996 Danish crime thriller film directed by Nicolas Winding Refn and written by Refn and Jens Dahl. It stars Kim Bodnia as Frank, a low-level drug dealer in Copenhagen, alongside Zlatko Burić, Laura Drasbæk, Slavko Labović, and Mads Mikkelsen. After a heroin deal is interrupted by police and the drugs are lost, Frank becomes heavily indebted to his supplier, Milo, and makes increasingly desperate attempts to raise the money he owes.

Burić received a Bodil Award in 1997 for his performance as Milo. The film has also received generally favourable critical reviews. Two sequels followed, each focusing on another character from Copenhagen's criminal underworld: Pusher II follows Tonny, while Pusher 3 follows Milo. The film was also remade in Hindi in 2010 and in English as Pusher in 2012.

== Plot ==
Frank, a low-level drug dealer in Copenhagen, goes to a heroin deal with his sidekick Tonny. The pair only manage to sell some of their product and go on to waste time about town. Frank visits his friend Vic, a prostitute who holds some of his stash for a fee. Vic wants to have a serious relationship with Frank, but Frank prefers to keep it purely casual.

Frank is visited by a former cell mate, a Swede named Hasse, and the pair set up a large drug deal. Frank visits his supplier, the local Serbian drug lord Milo, to get the heroin. Already owing Milo some money, Frank cannot cover the cost of the heroin, but Milo allows him to take the drugs provided that he immediately returns with the money.

The deal goes bad, however, when police arrive. In the process of evading the police, Frank falls into Sankt Jørgen's Lake, destroying the heroin. At the station, officers convince Frank that Tonny has delivered a confession that implicates Frank, but he still does not admit to anything. When Frank is released after twenty-four hours, he returns to Milo to explain how he lost the money and the drugs. Milo does not believe his story and demands that he pay back even more than he already owes. Frank immediately seeks Tonny out and savagely beats him with a baseball bat.

Milo's henchman Radovan accompanies Frank to help him collect on some of his own debts with Milo. The pair have a friendly conversation and Radovan shares his secret desire to open a restaurant. He tries to force an addict customer of Frank's to rob a bank to cover his debt, but the addict commits suicide in front of them. As Frank makes other disastrous attempts to earn money, Vic becomes increasingly insistent that they behave as a couple. He takes her to several clubs and makes plans to drive her to the veterinarian to see her sick dog.

Frank finally makes a deal, but his drug mule betrays him and switches the heroin for baking soda. Radovan drops his friendly demeanour and begins threatening Frank with serious injury should he fail to pay up soon. Frank goes on a desperate rampage, stealing money and drugs from the gym of some drug-dealing bodybuilders, but he is soon picked up by Radovan and tortured. Frank manages to escape and makes plans to flee with Vic to Spain.

After successfully making his final deal in Copenhagen, Frank receives a call from Milo, who promises to accept a token payment to put an end to their dispute. Milo and his henchmen, however, are actually planning to kill Frank when he arrives. When Frank bluntly informs Vic that their plans to flee are cancelled, she steals his stash of money and runs off. Throughout the city, Frank's enemies prepare to dispose of him.

== Cast ==
- Kim Bodnia as Frank, a low-level drug-dealer
- Zlatko Burić as Milo, a powerful Serb drug lord, with a fondness for baking
- Laura Drasbæk as Vic, a high-class prostitute and Frank's girlfriend
- Slavko Labović as Radovan, Milo's enforcer and aspiring restaurateur
- Mads Mikkelsen as Tonny, Frank's cheerful but manic partner
- Vanja Bajičić as Branko, Radovan's cousin and Milo's thug
- Peter Andersson as Hasse, a Swedish drug-dealer
- Lisbeth Rasmussen as Rita, Frank's untrustworthy drug mule
- Levino Jensen as Mike, a bodybuilding drug-dealer
- Thomas Bo Larsen as a drug addict who owes Frank money
- Lars Bom as one of the officers who interrogates Frank
- Nicolas Winding Refn as Brian, a young man who buys drugs from Frank and Tonny
- Gordon Kennedy as Scorpion, a customer of Frank, whom Frank bullies during a drug deal
- Jesper Lohmann as Mikkel

== Production ==
=== Development ===
The film began as a five-minute "short" that Refn had made as an application to a Danish film school. Refn turned down the offer he subsequently received, instead deciding to transform Pusher into a feature-length independent film utilizing a nominal amount of funding that he had managed to acquire.

Refn partnered with film student Jens Dahl to write the film's screenplay. His goal was to tell the story of a man under pressure, without glamorizing the lifestyle of a drug dealer. Refn organized the plot's events according to the days of the week in his notes and this was subsequently established in the final product. Refn's major inspirations for the film were The Battle of Algiers, Cannibal Holocaust, The French Connection, The Killing of a Chinese Bookie and Mean Streets.

=== Filming ===
During rehearsal, Refn became dissatisfied with Anders Nyborg, who was initially cast as Frank, with Refn thinking him too placid and boring. Two weeks before shooting was to begin, Refn fired Nyborg without a replacement in line. Refn approached Kim Bodnia, who was an established actor at the time, and Bodnia accepted. Though the other primary roles were mostly filled with experienced actors, many of the minor roles were filled by Refn's friends or people accustomed to the street life.

Bodnia brought a greater degree of intensity and aggressiveness to the part that some actors were not prepared for. Refn claimed that the surprised reactions of some actors are genuine, as they had not rehearsed with Bodnia beforehand and were expecting the previous actor's more sedate performances.

Slavko Labović, who played the Serbian thug Radovan, was a friend of Serbian war criminal Željko Ražnatović. He provided a poster of Ražnatović to use as a prop in Milo's headquarters. The actor playing Milo, Zlatko Burić, is actually a Croat. Refn became concerned when violence flared between Serbs and Croats during filming, but the events did not cause problems on set.

The film was shot using Danish union rules, which allowed no more than 8 hours of filming per day, and no filming on weekends. The rules, combined with the high cost of filming permits, caused time and budget constraints. The film was shot entirely using hand-held cameras. Refn wanted to capture a realistic, documentary feel to the film. This caused problems with the time constraints of the shooting schedule and Refn's desire to keep the film shadowy. Actors are often backlit or difficult to see due to the low levels of lighting used.

The film was shot almost completely in chronological order. Refn later admitted that shooting scenes out of order was confusing to him, but some scenes were reshot or added later. The scene in which Frank shoots at Milo's thugs was originally filmed without special effects, but Refn was dissatisfied with the results and reshot the scene using squibs. The scene with the junkie was shot after shooting had completed to replace a previous scene that Refn discarded because it dealt with an outdated vision of Frank's character.

== Soundtrack ==
Pusher: Soundtrack

Soundtrack album by Peter Peter and Povl Kristian
- Released: 1996
- Genre: Punk rock
- Label: Sony Music Records

Punk rocker Peter Peter and composer Povl Kristian composed the score, and formed the temporary band Prisoner to perform it, Peter playing guitar and Kristian playing the clavier. Kristian also composed the song "Summers got the colour", with text by Lars K. Andersen, which was sung by Aud Wilken.

Although Povl Kristian did not return to work on the sequels, the "Pusher theme" he wrote with Peter Peter was used in all of the following films.

== Reception ==
Zlatko Burić was given a Bodil Award in 1997 for his performance as Milo.

On the review aggregator website Rotten Tomatoes, 83% of 18 critics' reviews are positive, with an average rating of 7.1/10. Metacritic, which uses a weighted average, assigned the film a score of 72 out of 100, based on 11 critics, indicating "generally favorable" reviews.

The film was considered the first Danish-language gangster film and became a breakthrough success for Refn and several of the lead actors. Refn claimed that the film inspired cults of highly dedicated fans and influenced Danish fashion to emulate certain costumes worn by the characters. Kim Bodnia launched a very successful career as a leading man in Danish cinema largely due to the success of the film.

== Sequels ==
Two sequels followed, focusing on different characters from the same "underworld" milieu of Copenhagen.

Pusher II follows Frank's former partner, Tonny, who struggles with his relationship with his father following his release from prison; Tonny concurrently negotiates the prospect of becoming a father himself and the discovery that his mother had died while he was incarcerated. Pusher ends with Frank stranded in Copenhagen with no friends or resources, while his enemies poise to strike. Dialogue in Pusher II suggests that Milo, at least, never caught up with Frank.

Pusher 3 follows drug lord Milo through the course of a hectic day as he struggles with his attempt at sobriety, a series of problematic criminal deals, and his daughter's birthday celebration for which he is the chef.

Two remakes additionally followed: a Hindi remake of the same name released in 2010, and an English-language remake in 2012.
