= Leif Sylvester Petersen =

Danish artist, musician and actor

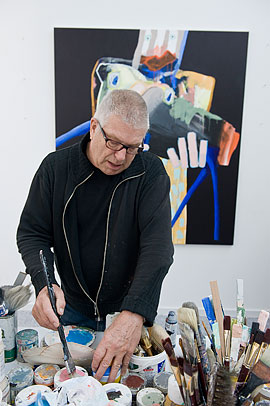
Leif Sylvester Petersen

Leif Sylvester Petersen (born 18 April 1940) in Copenhagen, also known as Leif Sylvester, is a Danish painter, graphic artist, musician, and actor. He originally trained as a carpenter, but has simultaneously worked as a musician and artist.

Petersen debuted in the late 1960s when he was at the artists' exhibition and was deeply disappointed with the launch of the established art. The same was Erik Clausen and together they began to exhibit in the streets and eventually to perform community satirical entertainment. Sylvester was about to make art, but at the same time he became involved in theater and music.

Clausen & Petersen made a series of plates and Sylvester formed the band Sylvester and Swallows, which also released several albums. He lives today of his art but helps on rare occasions in the film. Most recently, he exhibited at Sofie Holm. Among his decorations in public spaces is the bronze sculpture "That's it". Sylvester Petersen's family grave at Assistants Cemetery in Copenhagen.

Leif Sylvester Petersen took his stage name Sylvester as his real name, after being mistaken for the author Leif Petersen born in 1934.

== Filmography ==
=== Film ===
Year	Title	Role	Notes
1978	Me and Charly	Gøgler	
1978	Who is killing who?		
1979	Thralls rebellion	Narrator	
1981	Circus Casablanca	Ib Sylvester	
1982	Felix	Dennis	
1983	Otto is a rhino	Topper's Father	
1983	Rocking Silver	Benny	
1984	Middle of the night	Mand fra lokal vælgerforening	
1984	RainFox	Claude	
1985	Hodja from Pjort	Warden	
1989	Me and Mama Mia	Ludvig	
1993	The released	Iversen	
1994	Carl, My Childhood Symphony	Blinde Anders	
1995	Carmen and Babyface	Knife Grinder	
1996	A flea can also bark	Købmand Jørgensen	
2004	Pusher 2	Smeden	
2009	Oldboys	Svend Erik	
2012	Viceværten	Pensionist	
2014	Kartellet	Willy Halbo	
2015	People Get Eaten	Mester	

=== TV Series ===
Year	Title	Role	Notes
1997	Taxi	Tom Lund	56 episodes
2012	Rita	Torben	4 episodes
