= Lasse Spang Olsen =

Danish filmmaker (born 1965)

Lasse Spang Olsen (born 23 April 1965) is a Danish filmmaker. He is the son of illustrator and author, Ib Spang Olsen.

Apart from his many directorial and stunt coordinator credits, Olsen worked as a coordinator of extras on more than 300 films over the course of two decades.
