= Motti Cohen =

18th Commissioner of Israel Police

- מוטי כהן
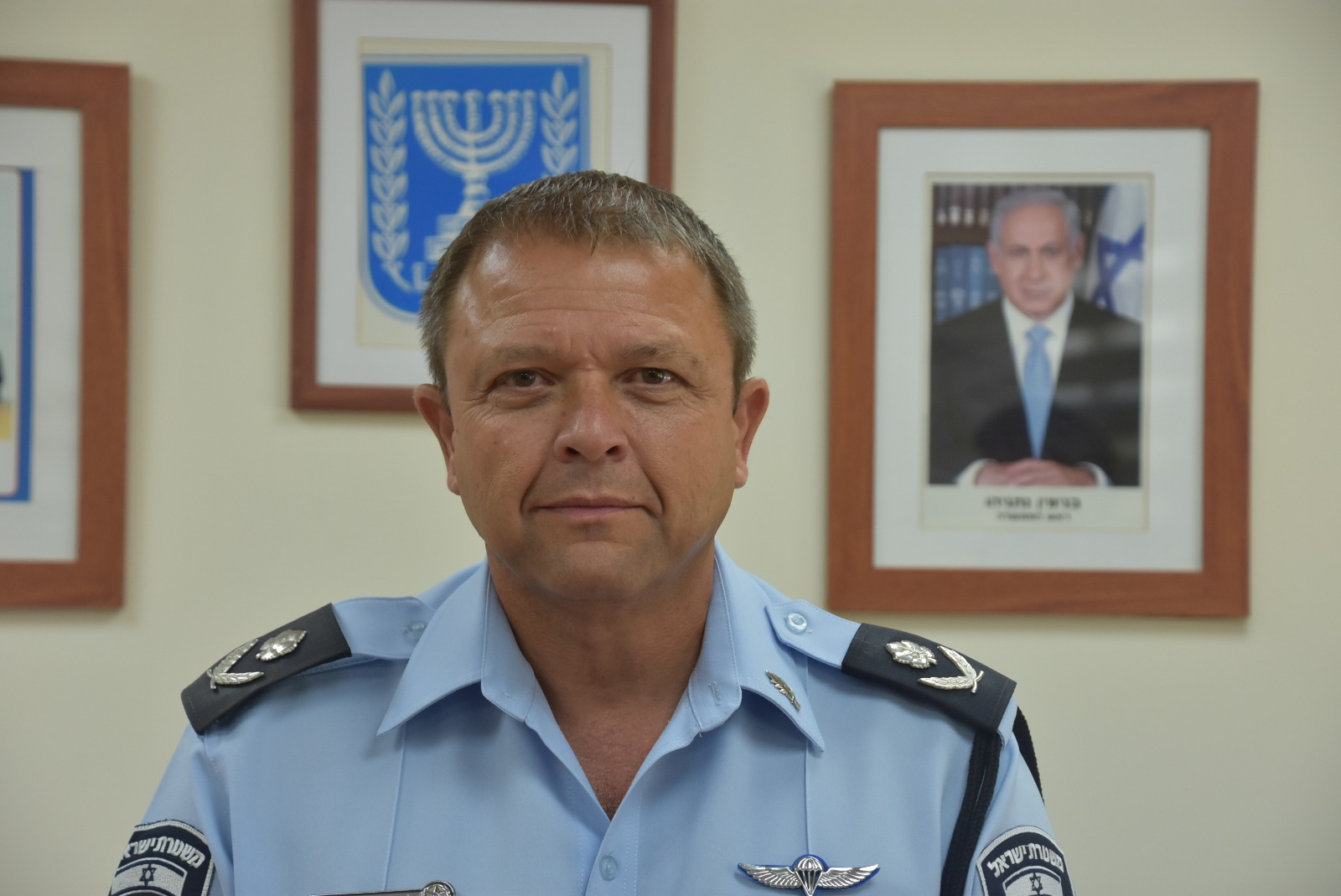
- Cohen in July 2018

18th Commissioner of Israel Police
- In office December 2018 – December 31, 2020
- Preceded by: Roni Alsheikh
- Succeeded by: Kobi Shabtai

Motti Cohen (Hebrew: מוטי כהן) is an Israeli police officer, who served as the 18th Commissioner of Israel Police from December 2018 to December 31, 2020.

== Career ==
In October 2014, Cohen was made Head of the Central District Police.

=== Commissioner of Israel Police ===
Cohen was appointed Commissioner of Israel Police in December 2018, succeeding Roni Alsheikh.

In November 2019, Cohen backed Lahav 433 after 80 former senior police officers wrote an open letter condemning "violent discourse against police and law enforcement agencies".

Cohen's term as Commissioner was set to expire on September 30, 2020. However, he was handed an extension until March 30, 2021, or until a permanent replacement is appointed.

In October 2020, Cohen dismissed accusations Israel Police were heavy handed in policing protesters at anti-Netanyahu demonstrations.

Cohen term as Commissioner of Israel Police ended on December 31, 2020. He was succeeded by Kobi Shabtai.
