= Yohanan Danino =

Chief of the Israel Police

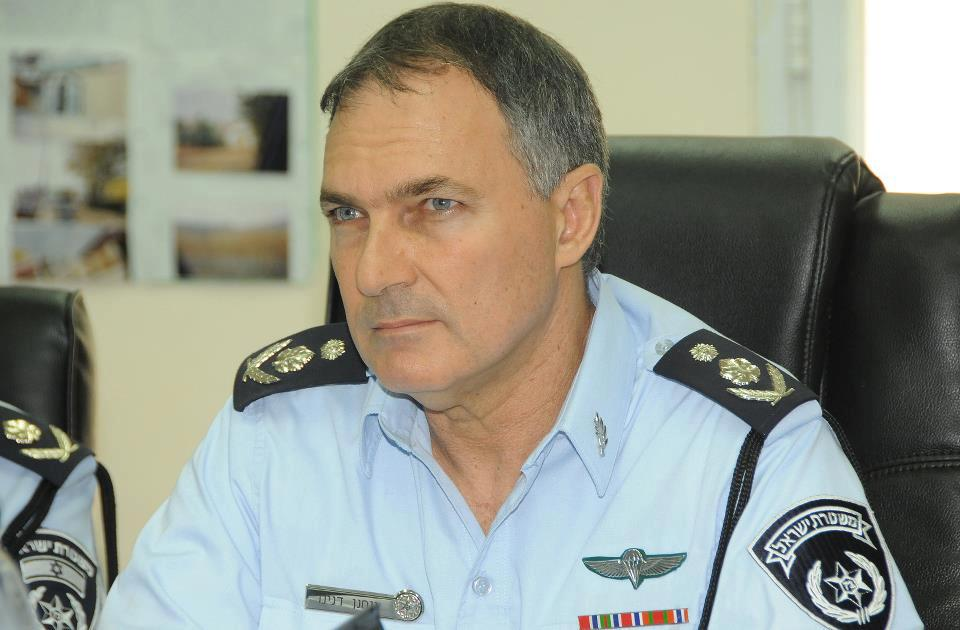
Yohanan Danino

Rav Nitzav Yohanan Danino (Hebrew: יוחנן דנינו; born 1959) is an Israeli police officer who served from May 1, 2011, to June 30, 2015, as the 17th chief of the Israel Police. Among other posts, he has led the Unit of International Crime Investigations and the police's Southern Command. He was also involved in high-profile investigations against top politicians, including Ehud Olmert, Avraham Hirschson, and Avigdor Lieberman.

== Personal life ==
Danino was born in Ashkelon on 20 December 1959 to a religious family, and studied in the Or Etzion Yeshiva. His parents, Israel and Aliza, were both school teachers. He currently resides in Modi'in-Maccabim-Re'ut, and is married, with four children.

== Military and police career ==
Danino served in the Israel Defense Forces until 1982, in the Paratroopers Brigade, after which he joined the Israel Police and studied law at Tel Aviv University. During his studies, he was charged with managing the volunteer base of the Civil Guard. He then became a prosecutor on behalf of the police, and went on to head the investigations office of the Sharon sub-district. In 1998, he became the deputy commander of a new unit that fought car theft, and during his tenure the number of thefts decreased significantly. In 2002, he was appointed to command the Unit of International Crime Investigations, and later helped found Lahav 433.

From 2006 to 2008, Danino headed the Investigations Department. During his term, he was involved in the investigations of then-Prime Minister Ehud Olmert, then-president Moshe Katzav, and then-finance and justice ministers, Avraham Hirschson and Haim Ramon. He also led the investigation against Foreign Minister Avigdor Lieberman. From December 2008 to May 2011, Danino headed the police's Southern Command. During his tenure, he presided over the demolition of an illegal mosque in Rahat, which generated great controversy among Israeli Arabs, but Danino countered that refraining from the demolition would deal a severe blow to the rule of law in Israel.

=== Term as Police Chief ===
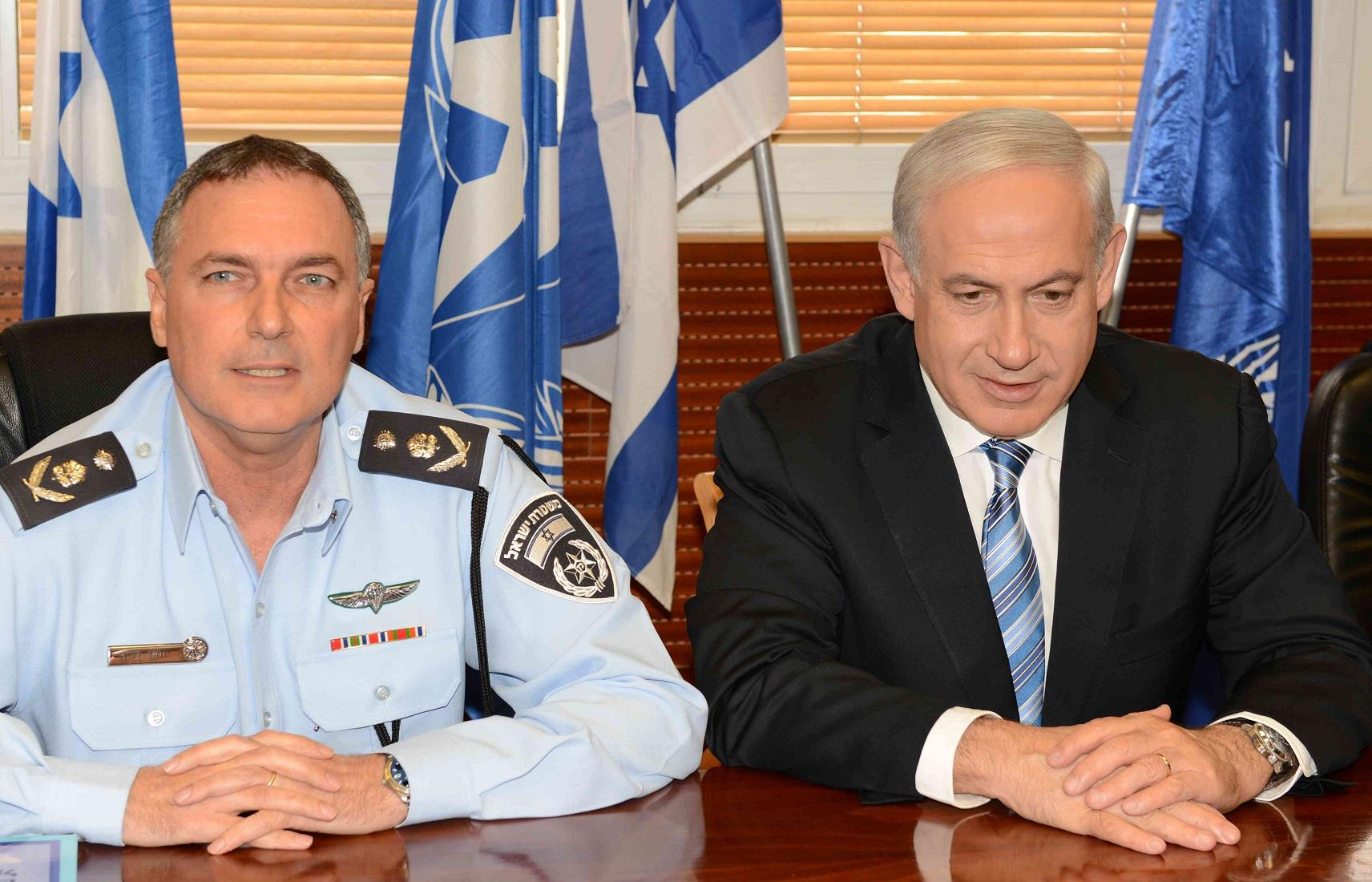
Benjamin Netanyahu with Danino

Danino replaced Dudi Cohen as chief of the Israel Police on May 1, 2011. He was praised by the Internal Security Minister Yitzhak Aharonovich, for fighting for the rights of police officers, among other things. His appointment was opposed by the Movement for Quality Government in Israel, pending a State Comptroller investigation into significant operational deficiencies within the police in an affair that involved the murder of two police agents. The movement petitioned the High Court of Justice against Danino's appointment, but the petition was rejected.

As his first acts as police commander, Danino split the Northern District of the police into two (Haifa, and the Galilee and Golan), and appointed a number of new commanders for the districts.

=== Anti-Police protests ===
In April 2015, a Beta Israeli (Israeli of Ethiopian origin) soldier in the IDF was the victim of an unprovoked and allegedly racist attack by an Israeli policeman, and the attack was caught on video. The soldier, Damas Pakedeh, was arrested and then released, after being accused of attacking the policeman. Pakada believes the incident was racially motivated and that if the video had not been taken, he would have been punished. Instead, the police officer was fired. Likud MK Avraham Neguise called on Danino to prosecute the police officer and volunteer, saying they engaged in "a gross violation of the basic law of respecting others and their liberty by those who are supposed to protect us". The Jerusalem Post notes that in 2015, "there have been a series of reports in the Israeli press about alleged acts of police brutality against Beta Israelis, with many in the community saying they are unfairly targeted and treated more harshly than other citizens".

The incident of police brutality with Pakedeh brought the Ethiopian community to protest. Hundreds of Beta Israelis participated in protests the streets of Jerusalem on April 20, 2015, to decry what they view as "rampant racism" and violence in Israel directed at their community. Israel Police Commissioner Yohanan Danino met with representatives of the Israeli Ethiopian community that day following the recent violent incidents involving police officers and members of the community. When over a thousand people protested police brutality against Ethiopians and dark skinned Israelis, Prime Minister Benjamin Netanyahu announced: "I strongly condemn the beating of the Ethiopian IDF soldier, and those responsible will be held accountable." In May 2015, after protests and demonstrations in Tel Aviv resulted in violence, injuries to demonstrators and police, Netanyahu planned to meet with representatives of the Ethiopian community, including Pakado. Netanyahu said the meeting would include Danino and representatives of several ministries, including Immigrant Absorption. Danino said he had already created a team of police representatives and Ethiopian community leaders who will work to improve relations.
