= Gal Hirsch =

Israeli brigadier general (born 1964)

- גל הירש
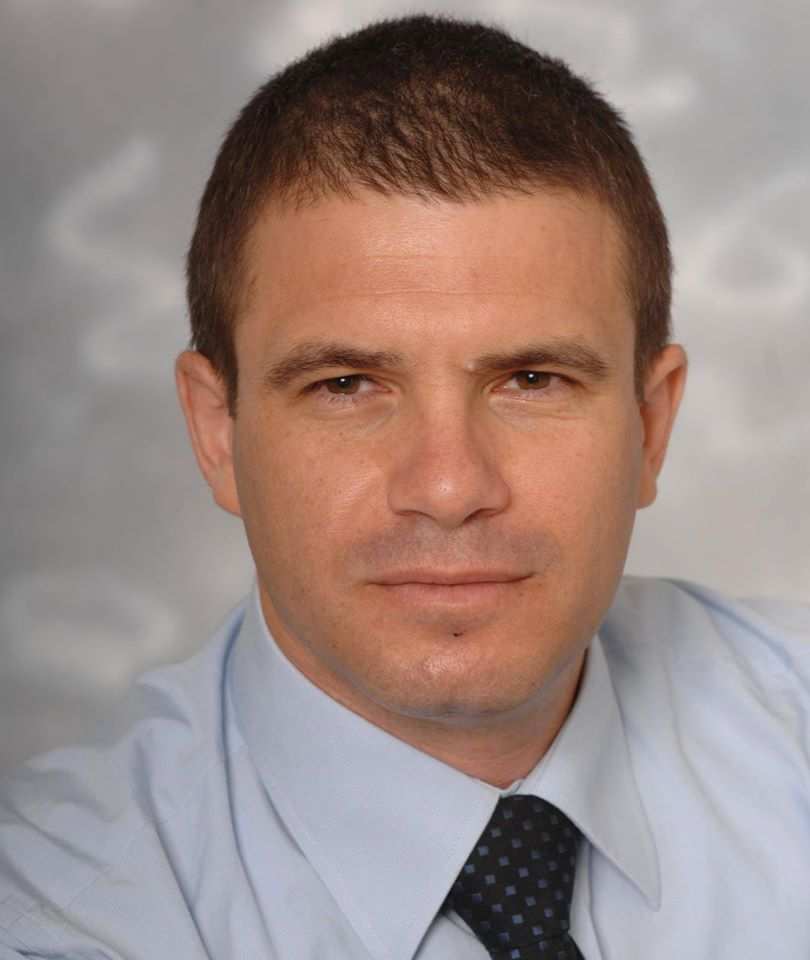
- Gal Hirsch
- Born: 1964 (age 61–62); Israel
- Military career
- Allegiance: Israel
- Branch: Israel Defense Forces
- Service years: 1982–2007
- Rank: Tat-Aluf (Brigadier General)
- Unit: Paratroopers Brigade
- Commands: 202 "Tsefa" (Viper) paratroop battalion; Shaldag Unit, IDF Officer Training School (Bahad 1); 91st Division
- Conflicts: First Lebanon War; South Lebanon conflict (1985–2000); Operation Grapes of Wrath; First Intifada; Law and Order; Second Intifada; 2006 Lebanon War

Gal Hirsch (Hebrew: גל הירש; born 1964) is an Israeli former military commander and author. As Brigadier General, he commanded the 91st Division of Israel Defense Forces (IDF) during the 2006 Lebanon War. Hirsch coordinated the negotiations for the captives and missing of the October 7, 2023 Hamas-led attack on Israel.

== Biography ==
=== Early life ===
Gal Hirsch was born to Yitzhak and Rachel and grew up in Arad, a member of one of the pioneering families of the city. His grandparents on both sides served in the Haganah. He studied at the Military Boarding School near the Herzliya Hebrew Gymnasium in Tel Aviv. Following the death of his cousin, Amnon Hagar, a pilot who died in the 1977 helicopter crash that killed 54 soldiers, Hirsch pursued a military education.

Hirsch holds a Bachelor's degree in Middle Eastern Studies from Bar-Ilan University and a Master's degree in Business Administration from Tel Aviv University.

=== Military service ===
In 1982, Hirsch enlisted in the IDF and volunteered for the Paratroopers Brigade. He passed the selection for the brigade's special units and was accepted into the Paratroopers Reconnaissance Unit. After completing the Officers Course, he served as a team commander at the IDF Officer Training School before returning to the Paratroopers Brigade, where he served as a team commander in the Paratroopers Reconnaissance Unit, including during Operation Electric Pipeline. He later became a company commander in the 202nd Battalion. In May 1988, as he was about to be appointed commander of the Engineering Company and was already shadowing the outgoing commander, Roni Alsheikh, he participated in Operation Law and Order.

In 1990, he served as the deputy commander of Sayeret Shaldag, under Benny Gantz. Later, he commanded the 202nd Battalion. In April 1993, in this role, he commanded Operation "Dream Girl" to capture Hamas leaders in Nablus.

In 1993, he was appointed commander of Sayeret Shaldag. In one of the operations he led, he commanded a Shaldag team in a deep mission in Lebanon, which nearly led to his dismissal from the IDF: operating with a small force that infiltrated a Hezbollah base, he refused to retreat despite delays and even turned off his communication device to complete the mission without being ordered to withdraw. The force successfully completed the mission and was extracted from Lebanon undetected. Hirsch faced severe criticism from the Chief of Staff, Amnon Lipkin-Shahak, but also received praise for his courage. During his command, Sayeret Shaldag received two Chief of Staff Awards for Excellence, as well as a unit citation for daring in classified operations, including in Operation Grapes of Wrath. Hirsch also wrote the unit's anthem. In 1996, he concluded his command of the unit.

In 1997, he was appointed the operations officer of the Judea and Samaria Division. During this time, the division prepared for potential military confrontation with the Palestinian Authority and its security forces, following the Western Wall Tunnel riots in 1996. During his service, Hirsch was seriously injured when Palestinians smashed his vehicle with a rock thrown from the Birzeit Bridge, paralyzing the right side of his body. Hirsch underwent a long rehabilitation process lasting about a year, after which he was left with a permanent disability. After his recovery, he returned to service and was appointed commander of the Binyamin Brigade.

In 1999, he commanded the Binyamin Brigade. During this period, the brigade received two Chief of Staff Awards. As the commander of the Binyamin Brigade, he decided, following the events of the Second Intifada, to close Highway 443 to Palestinian traffic, designating it as a critical-secured route to Jerusalem. His decision was overturned by the Supreme Court of Israel in December 2009. In 2001, he was appointed operations officer of the Central Command. In this role, he was involved in the planning and was one of the architects of Operation Defensive Shield. He was also involved in planning the Israeli West Bank barrier as part of "Operation Another Way."

In 2003, he was appointed commander of Bahad 1. During this period, all officer training courses, except for naval and pilot training, were moved to Bahad 1. He led the implementation of the "Appropriate Integration" directive, deciding that men and women would train together for officer courses, separated only in accommodations. As part of this decision, he led the closure of Bahad 12 as the base for female officer training. During this time, the school received two Chief of Staff Awards.

In April 2005, he was appointed commander of the Galilee Division and promoted to the rank of Brigadier General.

==== Second Lebanon War ====
Before the outbreak of the Second Lebanon War, he acted against the Hezbollah threat of soldier abductions. During his command of the Galilee Division, the division successfully thwarted four abduction attempts, including the Ghajar Abduction Attempt (2005).

The abduction of Ehud Goldwasser and Eldad Regev, which led to the outbreak of the Second Lebanon War, occurred in Hirsch's sector. During the war, criticism grew against Hirsch following a report aired on Channel 10, featuring the commander of 7th Brigade Amnon Eshel, who served under Hirsch's command and criticized him. Hirsch was also criticized for stating that IDF forces controlled Bint Jbeil before the Battle of Bint Jbeil, where eight Golani Brigade soldiers were killed.

Shortly after the war, Chief of Staff Dan Halutz decided to appoint Hirsch as the head of the Strategic Division in the Planning Directorate. However, before the release of the Almog Commission report, headed by retired Major General Doron Almog, Hirsch decided to resign in December 2006. Almog recommended Hirsch's dismissal due to the abduction incident, criticizing him for not preparing adequately for the possibility of abduction.

The main conclusion of the Almog Commission was that the abduction of Ehud Goldwasser and Eldad Regev could have been prevented. According to Hirsch, these findings were not accepted by a team of generals led by the Chief of Staff, who conducted a hearing and stated that the report "did not adequately reflect the difficult constraints present in the sector." According to him, the summary document of the hearing remains classified. On the other hand, a committee led by Major General Meir Kalifi concluded that Hirsch's orders were issued and communicated as required. Over the years, several officials supported Hirsch's defense, including the Chairman of the Winograd Commission, Eliyahu Winograd, retired Supreme Court Justice Mishael Cheshin, and the Movement for Quality Government in Israel. In January 2014, Justice Winograd addressed the Chief of Staff, Benny Gantz, expressing remorse and asking to rectify the injustice done to Hirsch.

==== Return to active duty ====
In February 2012, Hirsch was called back to the IDF, and was appointed as a deputy commander in the newly established IDF Depth Command created by Gantz. Hirsch completed his duties in August 2015.

Among his reserve duties, Hirsch also lectures in command courses within the IDF.

=== Business activities ===
After concluding his service in 2006, Hirsch founded Defensive Shield Holdings, a company specializing in projects, integration of knowledge and technology, and providing strategic and security consulting to governments and large corporations. The company provided services to the Georgian Army before the Russo-Georgian War in 2008, as well as to the intelligence service of Kazakhstan.

In 2013, Defensive Shield Holdings filed a lawsuit against pharmaceutical giant Teva, demanding a brokerage fee of 19 million shekels for Hirsch's involvement in Teva's acquisition of Cephalon. Two years later, Defensive Shield Holdings withdrew the lawsuit.

From 2020 to May 2023, Hirsch served as the president of the live feed company NEWSRAEL.

=== Police Commissioner nomination and investigations ===
On August 25, 2015, it was announced that the Minister of Public Security, Gilad Erdan, had decided to recommend Hirsch's appointment as the next Police Commissioner. The announcement sparked opposition from former senior police officers, and from families of fallen soldiers of the Second Lebanon War. The Attorney General, Yehuda Weinstein, instructed Erdan to hold off on the appointment until investigations regarding Hirsch concluded, stating that the investigation "would take a long time." On September 23, Erdan announced Hirsch's withdrawal from the candidacy. The suspicions against Hirsch involved bribery and integrity violations in two cases: a tender for removing mines in Rishon LeZion and suspicions of involvement in tax and bribery offenses in Georgia.

In April 2016, it was revealed that Hirsch was interrogated under caution regarding the Rishon LeZion mine clearing tender, on suspicion of integrity violations. On October 7, 2018, the State Prosecutor's Office announced the closure of the investigation due to lack of evidence.

In August 2015, it became known that the Georgian Ministry of Justice had requested legal assistance concerning Hirsch and other officials from his security consultancy company, in relation to the criminal case against former Georgian Defense Minister David Kezerashvili. In October 2015, the President of Georgia told Channel 2 News that "Gal Hirsch is innocent of any suspicion regarding his activities in Georgia." When asked if Hirsch was a victim of internal Georgian political intrigue, he dismissed the claim. On May 3, 2016, Hirsch was interrogated under caution on suspicion that his company had fraudulently won contracts. In April 2016, it was reported that a London court refused to extradite Kezerashvili to Georgia, stating that the accusations were politically motivated and indicative of "continuous political persecution," implying no bribery between Hirsch and the Georgians. In August 2017, it was reported that Kezerashvili was acquitted in Georgia. In September 2021, he was convicted after an appeal. Hirsh was also investigated by the FBI.

On August 5, 2019, the Israel Police and the Tax Authority recommended indicting Hirsch for tax evasion totaling millions of shekels. However, the bribery investigation related to Georgia was closed due to lack of evidence.

== Gaza war ==
Netanyahu appointed Hirsch to coordinate the negotiations for the captives and missing of the October 7, 2023 Hamas-led attack on Israel. He was criticized as unqualified for the position. In November 2023, several families of the Israeli hostages called for his resignation. In February 2026, Hirsch told the Times of Israel that the Israel hostage deal protests had spread "Hamas propaganda". Former Israeli hostages and their families sent him a letter criticizing his conduct and calling on him to resign. The letter stated that he had lied and threatened them not to criticize Netanyahu during the hostage crisis. In April Hirsch was honored as one of the 14 torchbearers in the national Israeli Independence Day ceremony, which former hostages including Rom Braslavski blasted as inappropriate.

== Books ==
- Hirsch, Gal (2009). War Story, Love Story (in Hebrew). ידיעות אחרונות. ISBN 9789654828109.
- Hirsch, Gal (2016). Defensive Shield (Revised English ed.). Gefen Publishing House. ISBN 9789652298652.
- Hirsch, Gal (2020). Follow Me. Gefen Publishing House. ISBN 9789657023044.
