= Yoav Segalovitz =

Israeli law enforcement officer and politician

- יואב סגלוביץ
- Segalovitz in 2026

Ministerial roles
- 2021–2022: Deputy Minister of National Security

Faction represented in the Knesset
- 2019–2020: Blue and White
- 2020–2026: Yesh Atid
- 2026–: Ra'am

Other roles
- 2008–2009: Commander of Lahav 433
- 2009–2013: Commander of the Investigations and Intelligence Division

Personal details
- Born: 23 April 1959 (age 67) Tel Aviv, Israel
- Party: Ra'am (since 2026)
- Other political affiliations: Yesh Atid (2016–2026)
- Spouse: Dorit Segalovitz
- Children: 3
- Education: Tel Aviv University
- Occupation: Law enforcement officer • Politician

Yoav Segalovitz (Hebrew: יואב סגלוביץ; born 23 April 1959) is an Israeli law enforcement officer and politician. Previously head of Lahav 433 and the Investigations and Intelligence Division, he served as a member of the Knesset for Yesh Atid from 2019 until 2026. Segalovitz was elected as an MK for Ra'am in the 2026 Israeli legislative election.

== Early life ==
Segalovitz was born in 1959 to Nahum and Tahia. He grew up in Tel Aviv and served in the Paratroopers Brigade during his national service in the Israel Defense Forces. He subsequently studied law at Tel Aviv University and volunteered in the Civil Guard.

== Career ==
=== Law enforcement ===
After graduation, Segalovitz joined the Police and worked as a prosecutor in the Sharon region, before becoming head of the Investigations Department in Netanya. He later became a trainer at the College for Senior Police Officers, before being appointed commander of the Eilat area police in September 2002. Eighteen months later he left to establish the national economic crime unit in the national police headquarters. In 2008 he became the first head of the Lahav 433 unit, which focused on national crime and corruption. The following year he became commander of the Investigations and Intelligence Division, a post he held until retiring in 2013.

=== Politics ===
He joined the Yesh Atid party in 2016. After the party became part of the Blue and White alliance, he was given the twenty-eighth slot on the alliance's list for the April 2019 Knesset elections, and was subsequently elected to the Knesset as Blue and White won 35 seats. He was re-elected in September 2019 and March 2020. Following the 2020 elections, Segalovitz opposed Blue and White joining Benjamin Netanyahu's government. This led to a split in the alliance, with Yesh Atid and Telem breaking away to sit in opposition. During the Knesset term, Segalovitz served as chair of the Lobby for the Fight Against Governmental Corruption and the Lobby to Combat Violence in Arab Society. Segalovitz was appointed the Deputy Minister of National Security in the Thirty-sixth government of Israel.

On 31 July 2026, it was reported that Segalovitz would not run with Yesh Atid in the 2026 election. A Haaretz report indicated that he would take the second place on the Ra'am party list. He reached an agreement with the party several days later, though he was not expected to join the party until it held primaries on 22 August. Segalovitz has also set conditions for joining the party, including recognizing Israel as a Jewish and democratic state and supporting national service for all Arab citizens. Segalovitz submitted his Knesset resignation on 9 August, and was replaced by Michal Slawny Cababia on 11 August 2026. Abbas announced at the end of the month that Segalovitz would be part of the party's slate. He was appointed in the second slot on the party's list, making him the first Jewish candidate for Ra'am. He was elected to the Knesset.

== Personal life ==
Segalovitz is married to Dorit; the couple has three children.
