= Unit of International Crime Investigations =

Israel Police unit

Israel Police's Unit of International Crime Investigations (Hebrew: יחב"ל, Yahbal) is the international and organized crime department of the National Major Crime unit (Lahav 433).

The department was originally founded in 1978, after the 1977 investigation of worsening major crime trends in the Israeli society, by the Shimron Commission, since the commission's findings pointed at the existence of organized crime in the country. In the early days the department was focused solely on major crimes. In 1997, once there was a clear understanding of organized crime being a strategic threat to the democracy in the State of Israel, the unit's purpose was shifted into becoming a national unit dealing with the international links of organized crime, focusing on sophisticated crimes, and major events spanning both Israeli territory and foreign countries. In 2008, after the founding of Lahav 433, the unit was attached to Lahav 433, along with the Prison Personnel Investigations Department (Yahas).

The headquarters of the Yahbal are located in the Lahav 433 compound.

== See also ==
- Israeli Police
- Lahav 433
