= National Traffic Police =

Traffic law enforcement unit of the Israel Police

The National Traffic Police (NTP; Hebrew: משטרת תנועה ארצית, romanized: Mishteret Tnu'a Artzit, abbr. Matna) is the main Israeli traffic law enforcement unit. It was founded in September 1991 and in 1997 subordinated to the newly created Traffic Department of the Israel Police. It is a division of the Israel Police and is responsible for enforcing traffic laws and regulations in Israel.

== Units ==
The National Traffic Police is divided into five regional units and a national patrol unit. The regional units are:

- Northern District Traffic Police
- Central District Traffic Police
- Tel Aviv District Traffic Police
- Jerusalem District Traffic Police
- Southern District Traffic Police

== See also ==
- Highway patrol
