= Haim Tavori =

- חיים תבורי

General Commissioner of Israel Police
- In office December 30, 1976 – December 31, 1979
- Preceded by: Shaul Rosolio
- Succeeded by: Herzl Shapir

Personal details
- Born: 1919 Rivne, Ukraine
- Died: 1992 (aged 72–73)

Haim Tavori (Hebrew: חיים תבורי; 1919–1992) was the 6th General Commissioner of Israel Police.

== Biography ==
Tavori was born in 1919 in the city Rivne in Ukraine, and in 1925 immigrated with his parents to Mandatory Palestine. He joined the Notrim in 1939 and served in Rosh Pinna.

In 1940, he enlisted in the mounted unit of the Palestine Police Force. In 1947, he was appointed as an instructor at the Police Academy in Bethlehem. In 1948 he joined the Israel Police and served in the Jerusalem police. He was wounded in Jerusalem during the war of Independence. And in 1949 he was second lieutenant in the outskirts of Jerusalem.

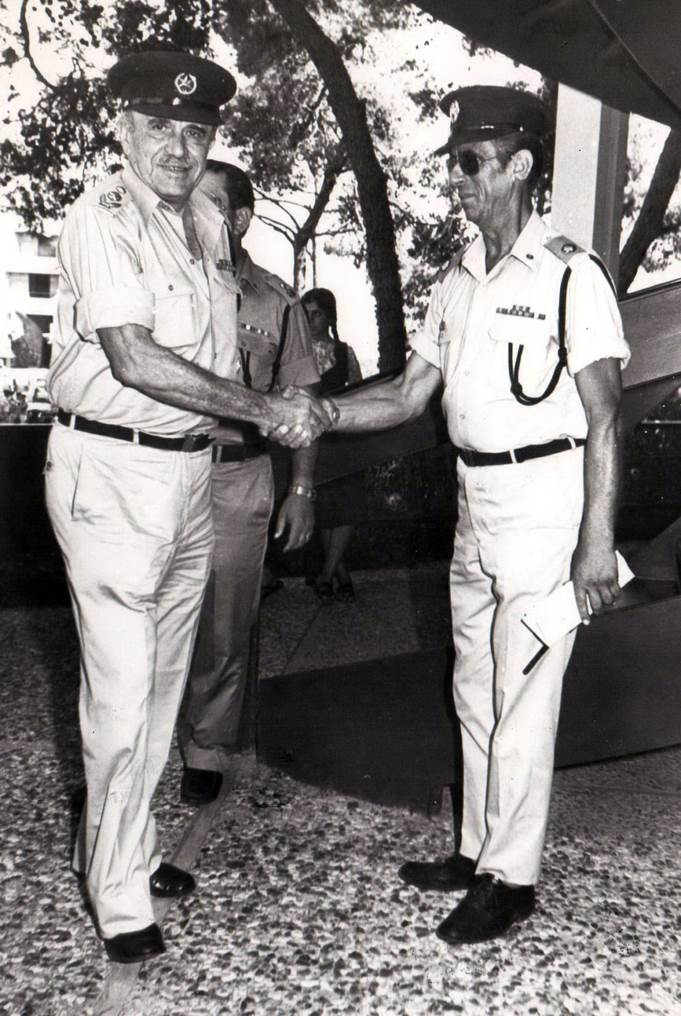
Haim Tavori

In 1950, he was appointed chief of Police of Beersheba-Sheva. In 1952 he became head of the Jerusalem District Traffic Branch, giving this post up in 1954 for commander of the Negev. In 1970 he was appointed a deputy commander of the Southern District police. In 1973 he was appointed commander of the Southern District. In 1975 he was appointed head of operations and was involved in preparing the police for internal security. In 1975–1976 he was head of the Department of Public Order and security.

On 30 December 1976 he was appointed Police Commissioner and served in this capacity until 31 December 1979. He died on August 12, 1992. and was buried in Mount Herzl in Jerusalem.

Police appointments
| Preceded by Shaul Rosolio | General Commissioner of the Israel Police; 1976 – 1979 | Succeeded by Herzl Shapir |
