= Meidoun =

- Village
- Location within Lebanon
- Coordinates: 33°28′9″N 35°38′26″E
- Country: Lebanon
- Governorate: Beqaa Governorate
- District: West Beqaa District
- Elevation: 1,090 m (3,580 ft)
- Time zone: UTC+2 (EET)
  - Summer (DST): UTC+3 (EEST)
- Dialing code: +961

Meidoun (Arabic: ميدون, romanized: Meydūn) is a village in the West Beqaa District in southern Lebanon. Following the 1982 invasion it was just north of the Israeli security zone.

== Modern history ==
On 4 May 1988 the Israeli army launched a 48-hour offensive against Meidoun in an operation known as Operation Law and Order. UNIFIL estimated that the invading force involved 1,500 soldiers with a dozen tanks, armoured vehicles and Cobra helicopters and that the village was bombarded overnight with over 1000 shells. After several hours of fighting the army blew up the fifty houses that the village consisted of. Over the following days the South Lebanon Army used bulldozers to demolish the ruins. After the raid Israeli statements claimed 40-50 Hezbollah fighters had been killed. Three Israeli soldiers were killed and seventeen wounded. One of the Israeli fatalities was a result of Lebanese Army artillery fire. According to the claim of Hezbollah organization, at that time the captured Israeli navigator Ron Arad was in the village of Nabi Shit in the Lebanon Valley, and on the night of the operation he was killed.

In October 2024 the IDF struck Meidoun as part of the Israel–Hezbollah conflict (2023–present).
