= Israel Police Bomb Disposal Unit =

Section of Israel National Police

- מערך החבלה של משטרת ישראל
- Active: 1970's – present
- Country: Israel
- Agency: Israel Police
- Type: Bomb disposal unit
- Role: Law enforcement Crime scene investigation after bombing incidents
- Operations jurisdiction: National
- Headquarters: Jerusalem, Israel

Website
- Official website

The Israel Police Bomb Disposal Unit (Hebrew: מערך החבלה של משטרת ישראל) is a section of the Israel National Police tasked with render-safe operations, recovery, disposal of explosive devices and processing crime scenes after bombing incidents. An Israeli police officer trained in bomb disposal is called "Chablan" (in Hebrew: חבלן).

== Mission and tasks ==
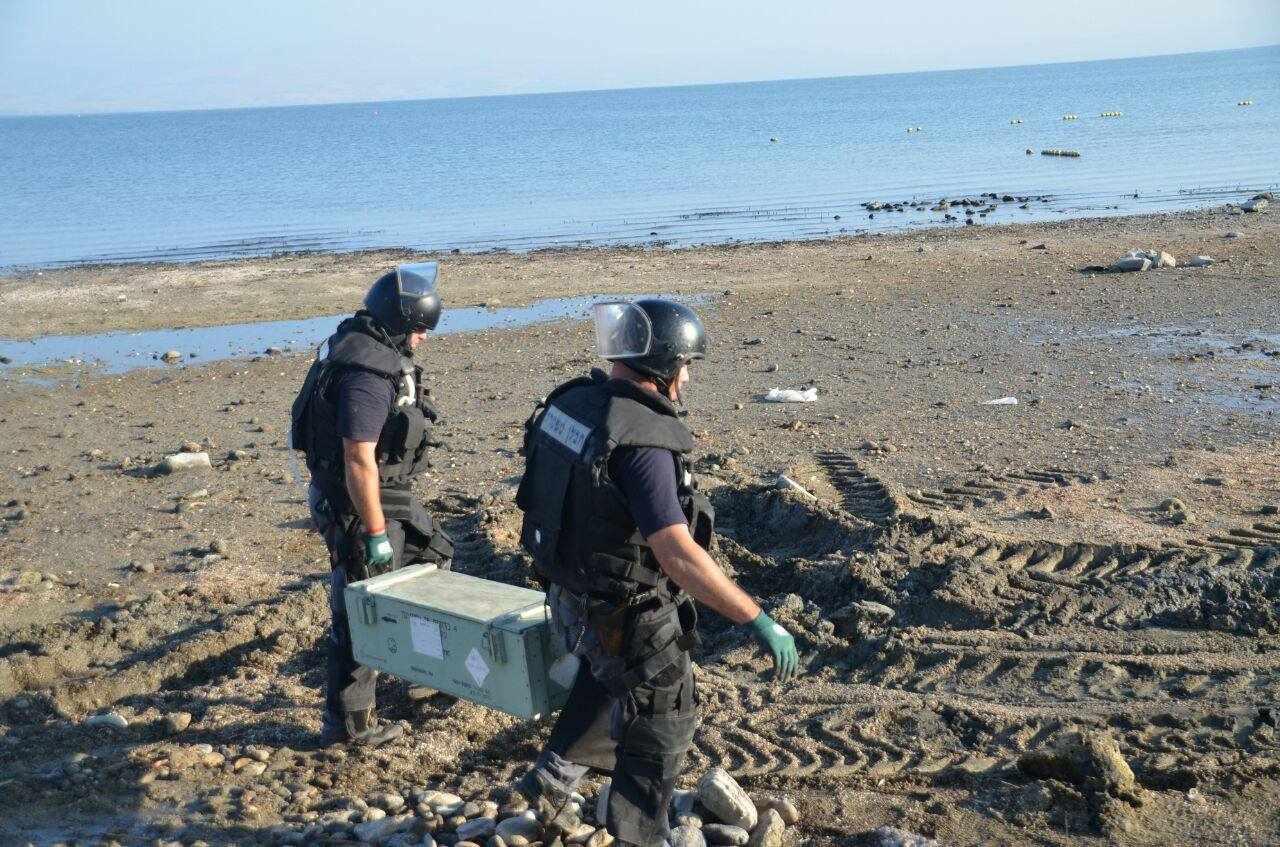
Disposal of unexploded ordnance from World War I which was washed ashore at the Sea of Galilee.

The unit is tasked with handling a variety of tasks. These include inspection and examination. of suspicious objects, render-safe procedures of IEDs, military explosive ordnance and unexploded ordnance.

Stations of the unit are located in the major cities and in districts which cover different regions of Israel.

The Israel Border Police operates similar units which conduct similar tasks in the Judea and Samaria Area.

== Personnel ==
Personnel of the bomb disposal unit are police officers which have usually served previously in combat or engineering units of the Israel Defence Force.

== Ranks and insignia ==
Personnel of the Israel Police Bomb Disposal Unit are permitted to wear the unit's symbol as a badge on their uniform.

The symbol consists of:

- The emblem of the Israel Police in the center.
- A pair of olive branches on both sides as a symbol of security and peace.
- A pair of lightning bolts to symbolise the explosive effects during a neutralisation of an explosive device.
- Red background as symbol of a unit which operates in hazardous environments.

The unit's symbol can also be found on vehicles and on equipment.

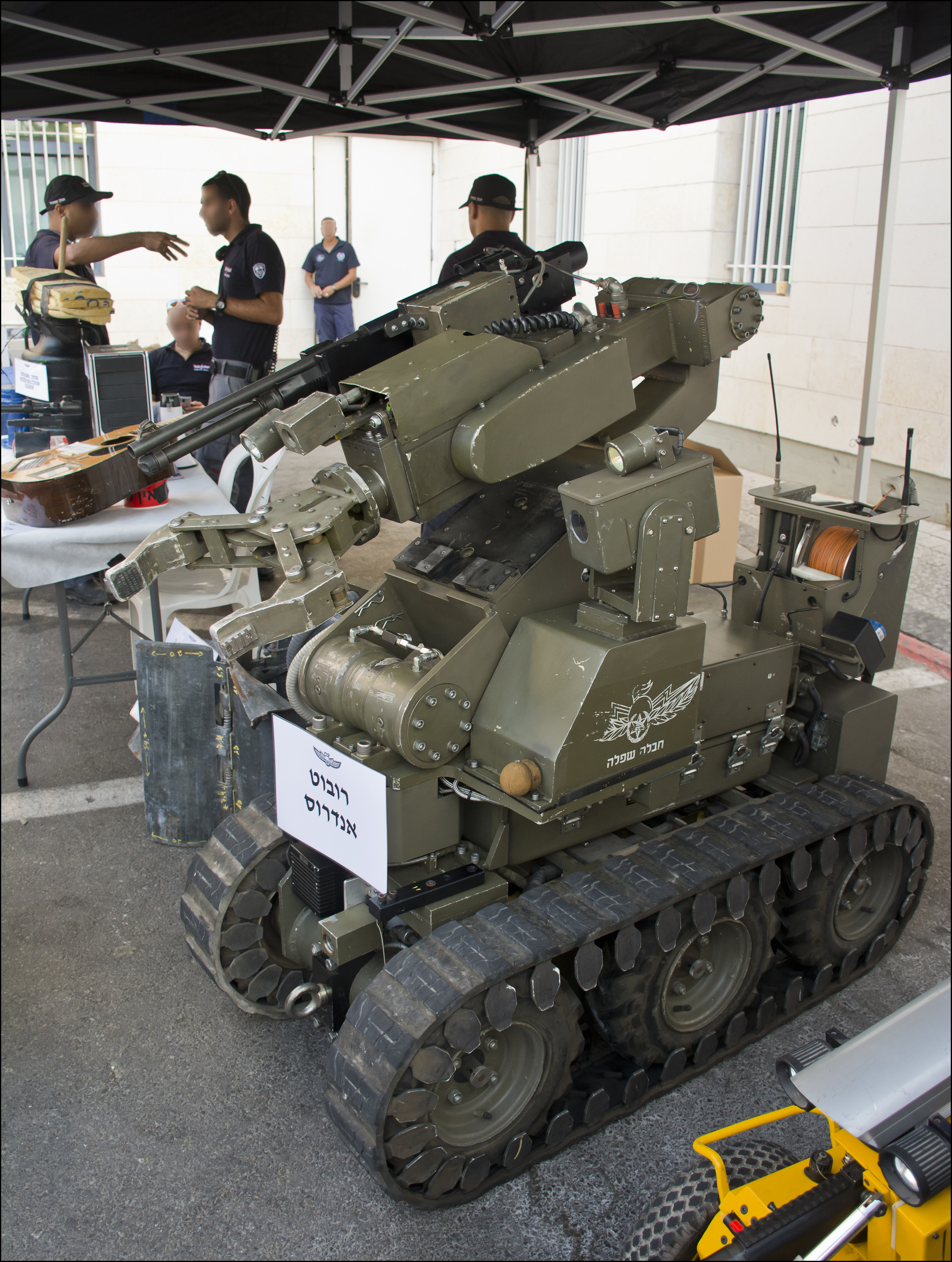
Andros EOD robot on display.

== Equipment ==
- Bomb suits
- ANDROS police robot
- Bomb containment chambers on vehicles
- Barrett M82 Anti-materiel rifle
