= Daniel Levi (police commissioner) =

Commissioner of the Israel Police (born 1964)

- דִּנִיֵּאל לֵוִי
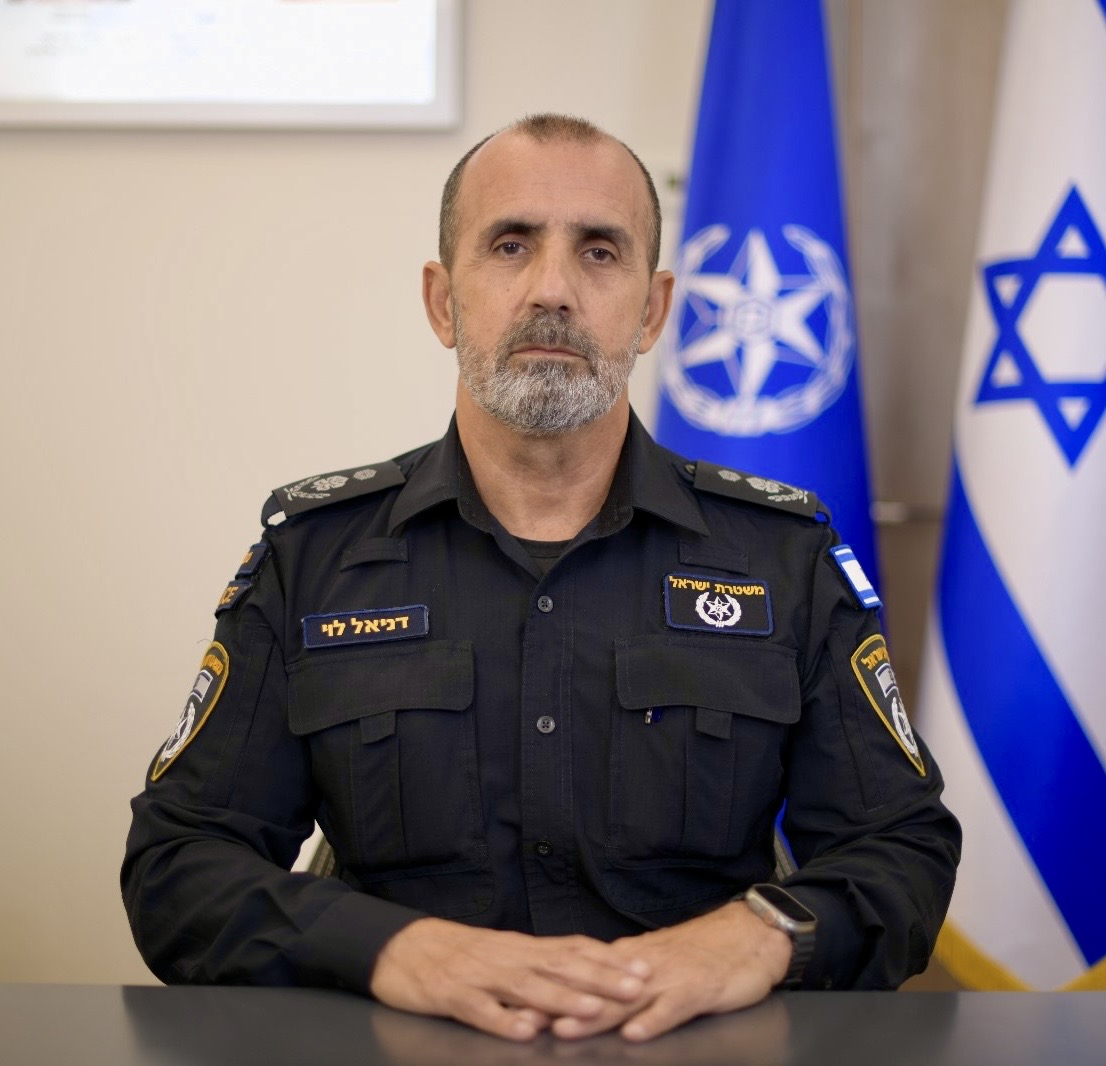

20th Commissioner of Israel Police
- Incumbent
- Assumed office August 25, 2024
- Minister: Itamar Ben-Gvir
- Preceded by: Kobi Shabtai

Personal details
- Born: 1964 (age 61–62)
- Occupation: Police officer

Military service
- Allegiance: Israel
- Branch/service: Israeli Army
- Rank: Captain
- Unit: Artillery Corps
- Battles/wars: Israeli-Palestinian War

Daniel "Danny" Levi (also Levy) (Hebrew: דִּנִיֵּאל "דָּנִי" לֵוִי; born 1964) is an Israeli law enforcement officer serving as the 20th commissioner of the Israel Police.

== Biography ==
Levi served in the IDF in the artillery corps. He joined the Israeli Police in 1985, serving at times as a patrol, and intelligence officer and detective at the Jaffa and Bat Yam stations in the Tel Aviv District.

In 2005, he was appointed commander of the Shechunot station in the Tel Aviv District, and in 2007, he was appointed as operations officer of the Yiftah Region. In 2009, he was appointed commander of the Lev Tel Aviv station. In this role, he was responsible for handling the demonstrations during the 2011 social justice protests. In 2013, he was promoted to operations officer of the Tel Aviv District. In 2016, he was appointed commander of the Yiftah sub-district, and in 2017, he was appointed commander of the Yarkon Region.

During Levi's tenure in Yarkon Region, local police violently arrested a photographer during a protest. The photographer sued the department and was awarded 63.5 thousand ILS by the Tel Aviv District Court.

In 2021, Levi was appointed deputy commander of the Jerusalem District Police. In 2023, he became head of the Hof District police. During Levi's tenure, the murder rate rose by 77%, and the district was ranked last for organisational climate.

In July of 2024, National Security Minister Itamar Ben-Gvir nominated Levi to serve as commissioner of the Israeli Police, replacing Kobi Shabtai. Levi's nomination was approved on 14 August and went into effect on 25 August.

In September of 2024, Channel 12 published recordings of homophobic remarks Levi had made in early 2024. Levi responded by meeting with representatives of The Association for LGBTQ Equality in Israel, and published a statement saying he respects the LGBTQ community.

In October of 2024, Levi attempted to dismiss the police's legal advisor from his post. The move was blocked by Attorney General Gali Baharav-Miara.

In December 2024, Kan 11 reported that Levi had instructed his subordinates to deliberately under-report and misreport crimes in order to manufacture a reduction in crime statistics.

== Personal life ==
Levi is married to Rachel and has 3 children - Noam, Omer and Yaniv. He resides in Zichron Yaakov. He holds a bachelor and a graduate degree.
