= Pinhas Kopel =

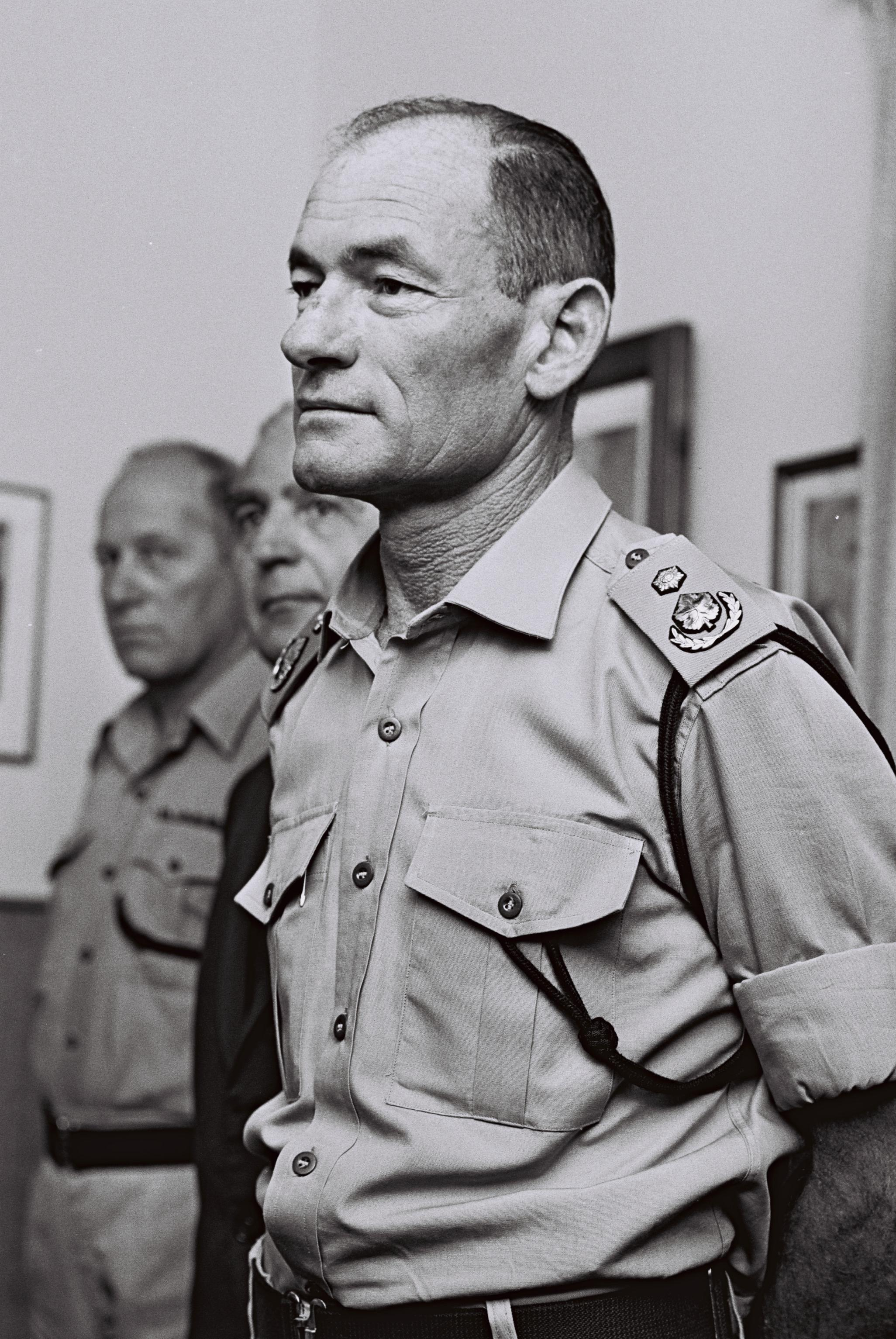
Pinhas kopel

Pinhas Kopel (Hebrew: פנחס קופל; January 15, 1918 – November 5, 1997) was the first commander of the Israel Border Police and the third inspector general (also called General Commissioner) of the Israel Police.

Koppel was born on January 15, 1918 (2 Shvat 5678 on the Hebrew calendar) in the town of Turek in central Poland. He emigrated with his parents to Mandatory Palestine in 1924. At the age of 15, he volunteered for the Haganah, served in the Notrim Police Force as a Rav Samal (Sergeant Major) on various missions in the Tirat Shalom and Rosh Pinna areas. He served as commander of the Mobile Guards as well as under Orde Wingate.

He graduated the first officers course of the Haganah in 1939, and in 1941, after the outbreak of the Second World War, he volunteered in the British Army and served on various fronts. In 1946, he was discharged with the rank of sergeant major and joined the Dan Transportation Cooperative (now the Dan Bus Company) as a bus driver. He continued to be a member of the Haganah, and in 1947 he joined the permanent staff of the Haganah and served as an instructor.

In the 1947–1949 Palestine war, he was a convoy commander in Operation Nachshon. He served in the 7th Armored Brigade as a deputy commander and as a commander, and took part in the battles of Latrun.

Koppel left the army in 1950 as a major and transferred to the General Security Service. In 1953, with the establishment of the Israel Border Police, Kopel was appointed as the force's first commander.

In May 1964, he was appointed to succeed Yosef Nachmias as Inspector General (also called Commissioner General) of the Israel Police after Nachmias had announced his resignation. His term as Inspector General began on 1 July of that year. He held this post until 1972. After his service in the police force, settled in Kfar Bin Nun. After retiring from the police force, he served as chairman of the commission of inquiry established to investigate the circumstances of the Munich Olympics massacre. He also served as president of the Israel Football Association.

He died on November 5, 1997 (5 Cheshvan 5758) and was buried in the Police cemetery on Mount Herzl in Jerusalem.

The Israel Border Police Heritage and Commemoration Center (Hebrew: מרכז המורשת וההנצחה של משמר הגבול), near Barkai, is named for him.
