= Kobi Shabtai =

19th Commissioner of Israel Police

- קובי שבתאי
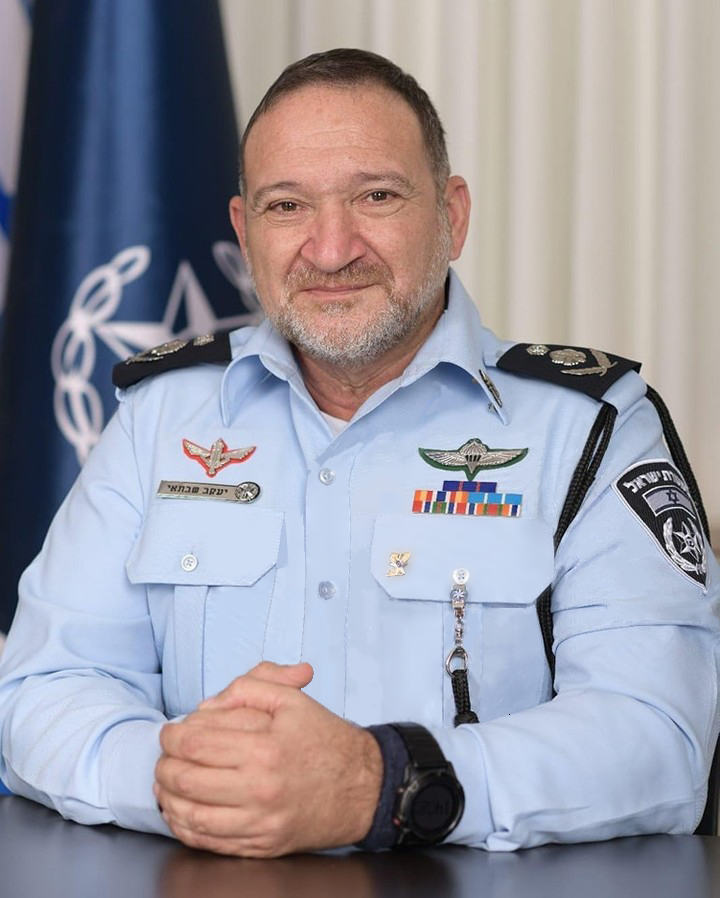
- Shabtai in September 2022

19th Commissioner of Israel Police
- In office January 17, 2021 – July 17, 2024
- Minister: Amir Ohana; Omer Bar-Lev; Itamar Ben-Gvir
- Preceded by: Motti Cohen
- Succeeded by: Daniel Levi

Personal details
- Born: Yaakov Shabtai; November 11, 1964 (age 61) Ashkelon, Israel

Military service
- Allegiance: Israel
- Rank: Captain

Yaakov "Kobi" Shabtai (Hebrew: יעקב (קובי) שבתאי; born November 11, 1964) is an Israeli police officer who served as the 19th Commissioner of Israel Police from January 17, 2021 to July 17, 2024. He has previously served as the Commander of the Border Police as a deputy commissioner.

== Biography ==
Kobi Shabtay was born on November 11, 1964, in Ashkelon, Israel, to Iraqi Jewish immigrants. He is divorced and had three daughters, including one who serves as a patrol officer in the police and another who enlisted in the Israel Border Police for her national service.

== Career ==
Shabtai was enlisted in the 202nd Battalion of the Paratroopers Brigade in 1982. He was discharged in 1987 at the end of his service at the rank of 'Seren' (Captain).

Shabtai joined the Israel Border Police in 1991.

In July 2020, Shabtai was diagnosed with COVID-19.

=== Commissioner of Israel Police ===
Shabtai was appointed Commissioner of Israel Police on January 17, 2021, succeeding Motti Cohen.

On 25 April 2021, Shabtai ordered the removal of barricades preventing access to the Damascus Gate in East Jerusalem after violent protests.

Following the 2021 Mount Meron crowd crush, in which 45 men and children died, Shabtai said "My conscience is clear; I’m not going to resign", and added that he would not allow the police to be scapegoated for the incident. In 2024, a state commission of inquiry found him personally responsible for the incident. The committee said that the findings would have led it to recommend his removal from office, but since his term was extended because of the war in Gaza, it would leave the decision to the government.

In a leaked recording of a conversation with National Security Minister Itamar Ben-Gvir, Shabtai said "There's nothing we can do. They murder each other. It’s in their nature. That’s the mentality of the Arabs", resulting in leading Israeli Arab politicians calling for his dismissal for anti-Arab racism.

On 25 June 2023, Ben-Gvir announced that Shabtai's position as the head of the Israel Police would not be extended after the end of his term in January 2024. This announcement was the result of dispute between Gvir and Shabtai.

The outbreak of the Gaza war on October 7, 2023 resulted in the opposition party National Unity joining the thirty-seventh government led by prime minister Benjamin Netanyahu to form a national unity government and the Israeli war cabinet .The new government decided that the tenures of outgoing Israeli officials would be extended in view of the prevailing situation in Israel. In December 2023, Gvir refused to extend the tenure of Israel Prison Service Commissioner Katy Perry and said that the extension of Shabtai's tenure was also in doubt. However, in January 2024 Shabtai was ultimately asked to continue in his position as the commissioner of Israel Police until 17 July 2024. He was succeeded by Daniel Levi.
