= Shaul Rosolio =

Israeli police commissioner (1923–1992)

Shaul Rosolio (Hebrew: שאול רוזוליו; 1923–1992) was the 5th Israeli Police Commissioner. He held this post from 1972 to 1977.

== Biography ==
Rosolio was born in 1923 in Tel Aviv. Rosolio's brother Daniel later became a Knesset member. He is buried on Mount Herzl in Jerusalem.

== Police career ==
At age 19 Rosolio enlisted and served as a guard in 1946. During the 1947–1949 Palestine war he helped build a training program for the Israel Police. Rosolio enlisted with the rank of inspector. He served at the national headquarters and in 1951 he was appointed commander of the police training base. In 1956 he was appointed deputy commander of the District. Later he became deputy commander of the Jerusalem district.

In 1960 he was responsible for the place of imprisonment of Adolf Eichmann. From 1962 to 1970 was commander of the Southern District. From 1970 - 1972 he was chief of the police organization. On 1 August 1972 he was appointed assistant chief, and after the death of commissioner Aaron Rock, Rosolio was appointed commissioner on November 1.

== Diplomatic career ==
On 30 December 1977 he retired as Israeli ambassador to Mexico.

Police appointments
| Preceded by Aharon Sela | General Commissioner of the Israel Police; 1972 – 1976 | Succeeded by Haim Tavori |
