= Operation Law and Order =

Israeli military operation against a Hezbollah base in Lebanon

- Part of the South Lebanon conflict (1985–2000)
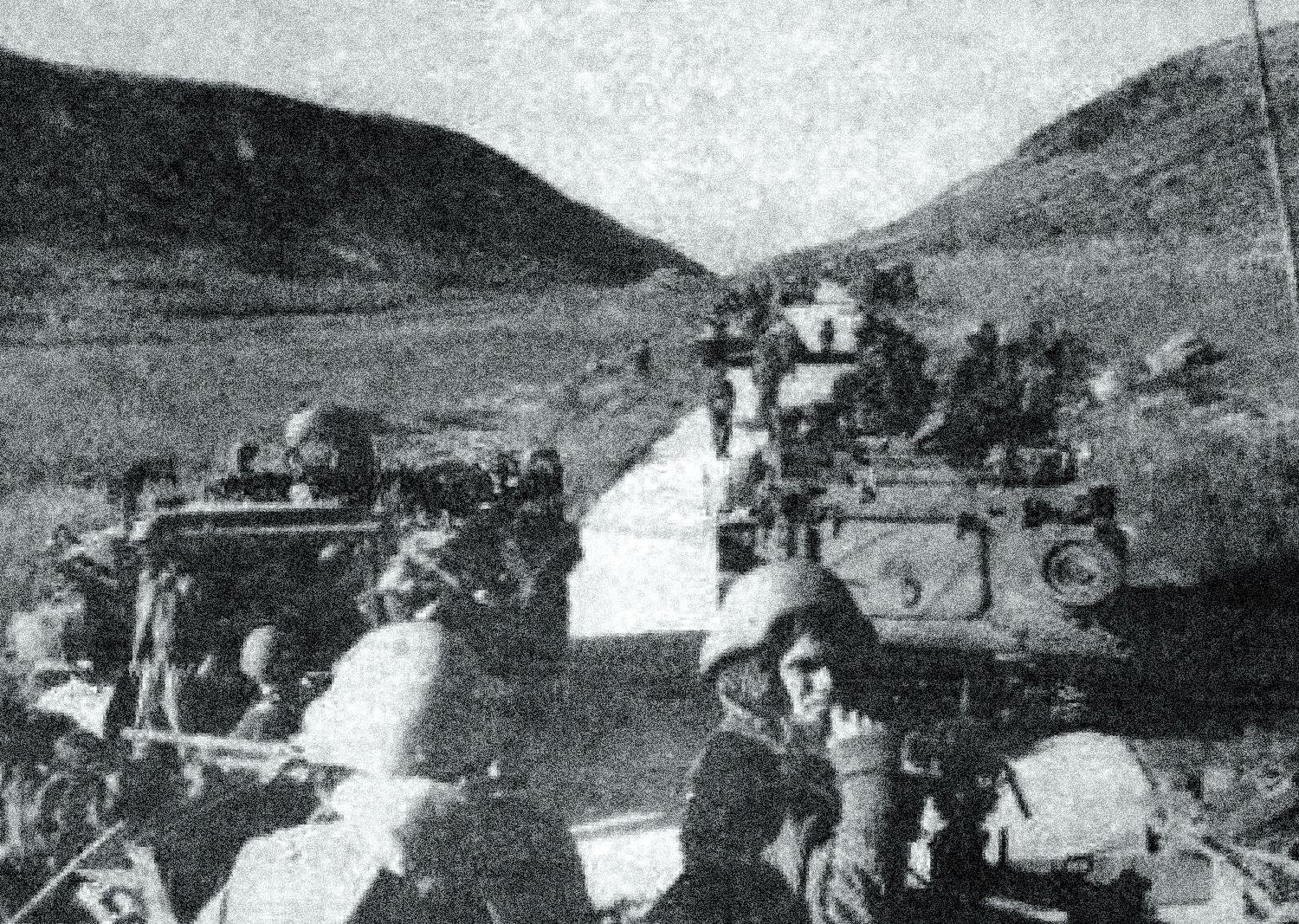
- Israeli troops coming back from Lebanon
Date	May 2, 1988 – May 4, 1988
Location	Meidoun, Lebanon
Result	Israeli victory

Belligerents
Israel; Supported by: South Lebanon Army	Hezbollah

Commanders and leaders
(Israel) Yossi Peled (Israel) Shaul Mofaz (Israel) Amos Ben-Haim	Unknown

Casualties and losses
3 killed 17 wounded	40 killed (claimed by Israel); 1 captured

Operation Law and Order was a 1988 Israeli military operation against a Hezbollah base in the village of Maydoun.

== Background ==
On April 26, 1988, a Hezbollah infiltration attempt at Har Dov ended in a battle during which an Israeli officer, Lieutenant Colonel Shmuel Adiv, a battalion commander in the Givati Brigade, was killed along with the entire Hezbollah cell. In response, the commander of the IDF Northern Command, Major-General Yossi Peled, decided to raid the Lebanese town of Maidun, the known location of a Hezbollah headquarters.

As a result, a two-pronged operation was planned. The first, Operation Law, would see a Paratroopers Brigade unit commanded by Lieutenant Colonel Amos Ben-Haim, raid Lebanese villages in the vicinity as a distraction, though it was also hoped that enemy fighters could be captured and weapons seized. The main operation would be Operation Order, which would be led by the Paratroopers Brigade commander, Colonel Shaul Mofaz. The operation would be carried out by Battalion 202, commanded by Lieutenant Colonel Yitzhak Gershon, supported by additional paratrooper and infantry units commanded by Major Roni Alsheikh, Captain Gal Hirsch, Major Gadi Shamni, and Captain Matti Horowitz. They were supported by a tank company from the 7th Armored Brigade commanded by Captain Omri Sadeh, an artillery unit commanded by Zvi Fuchs, and Israeli Air Force attack helicopters.

== The battle ==
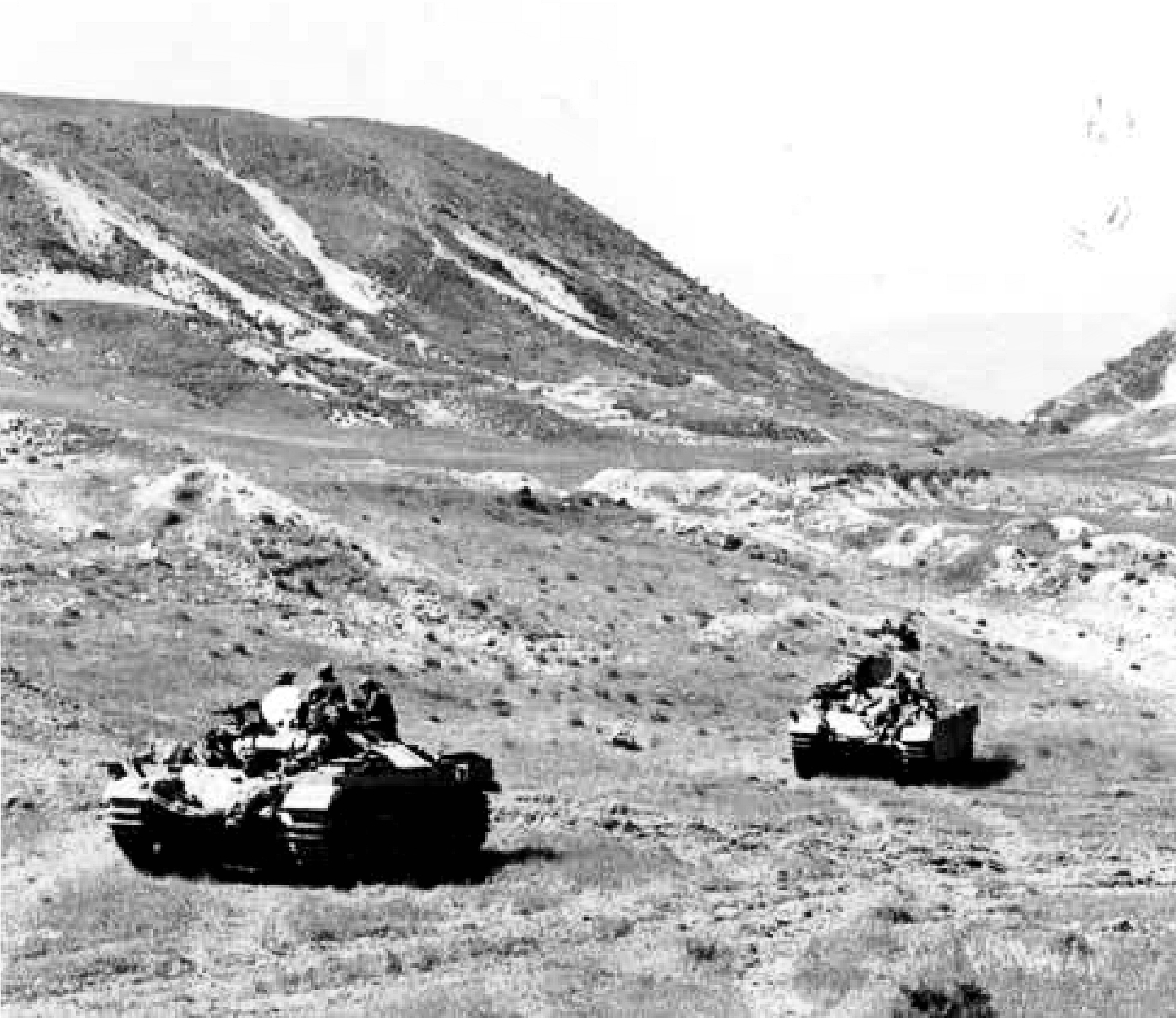
Israeli Tanks in South Lebanon, May 4, 1988

On May 2, Operation Law began when the 890th Paratroop Battalion, led by Benny Gantz, and 50th Paratroop Battalion unit, began search and destroy operations against guerrilla infrastructure in South Lebanon, and scattered propaganda leaflets. The following day, Operation Order began, when Israeli Paratroopers, mainly from 202 Paratroop Battalion, and armor raided Maidun. As the column crossed into Lebanon, it was fired at by the South Lebanon Army in a friendly fire incident due to lack of coordination. The column successfully fought its way into the village after coming under fire and engaged Hezbollah fighters at point-blank range, with artillery and air support participating and suppressing Syrian artillery firing in support of Hezbollah fighters, and Hezbollah fighters attempting to escape attacked.

== Aftermath ==
Israeli sources said the goal was to "restore the army's image" and deter the Arab enemies, while Western military sources said it was "designed for home consumption", Before the fighting, Majdoun was a village of 50 houses. Those left standing were dynamited by the Israeli ally, the South Lebanon Army.
