= Lahav 433 =

Israeli law enforcement agency

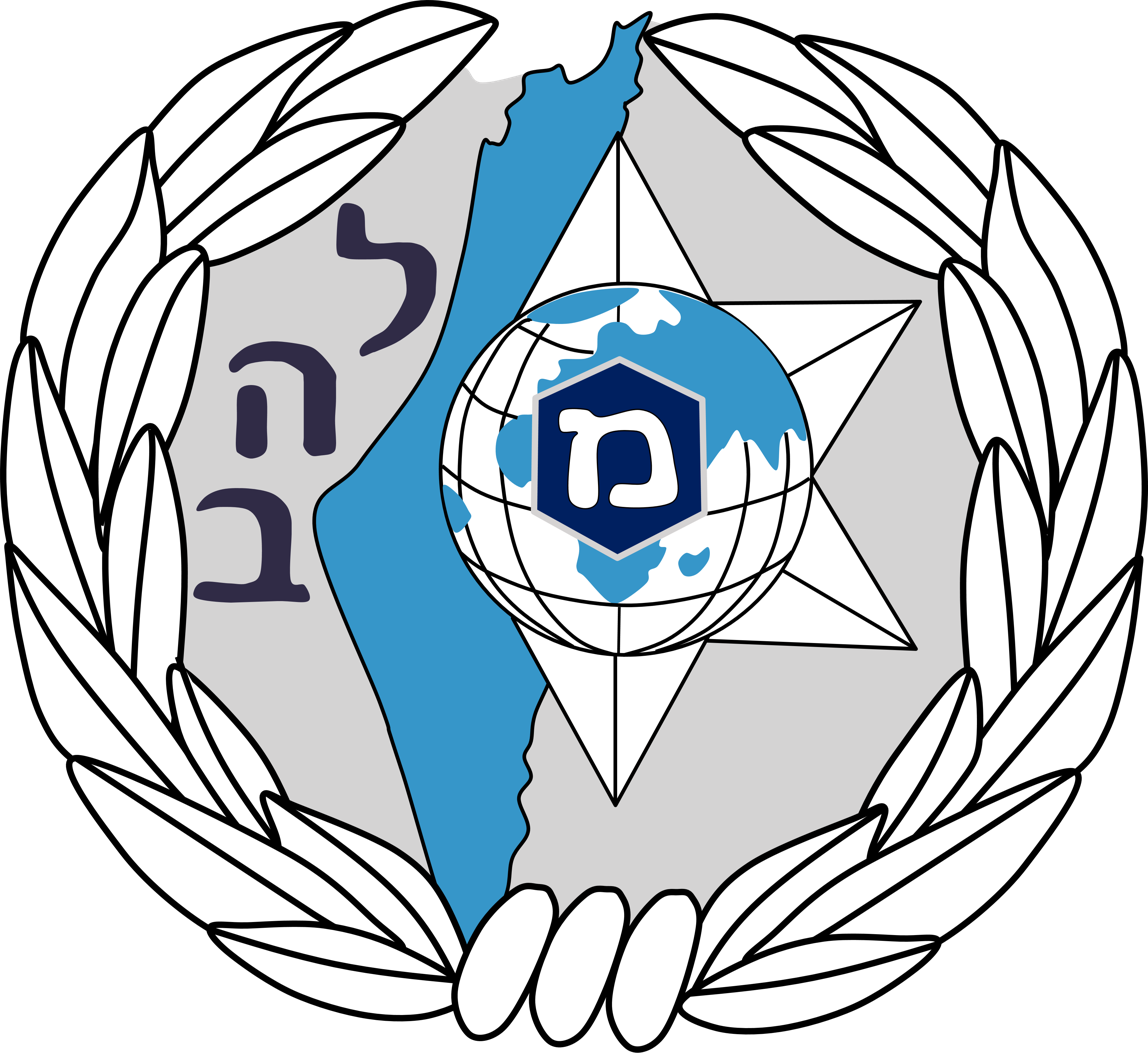
Logo of Lahav 433

Lahav 433 (Hebrew: לַהַב 433) is an Israeli crime-fighting umbrella organization within the Israel Police, created on January 1, 2008. Known as the "Israeli FBI", the unit is the merger of five law enforcement offices into one. It was established as an initiative of then-Minister for Public Security, Avi Dichter, and the Head of Police's Investigations Branch, Yohanan Danino.

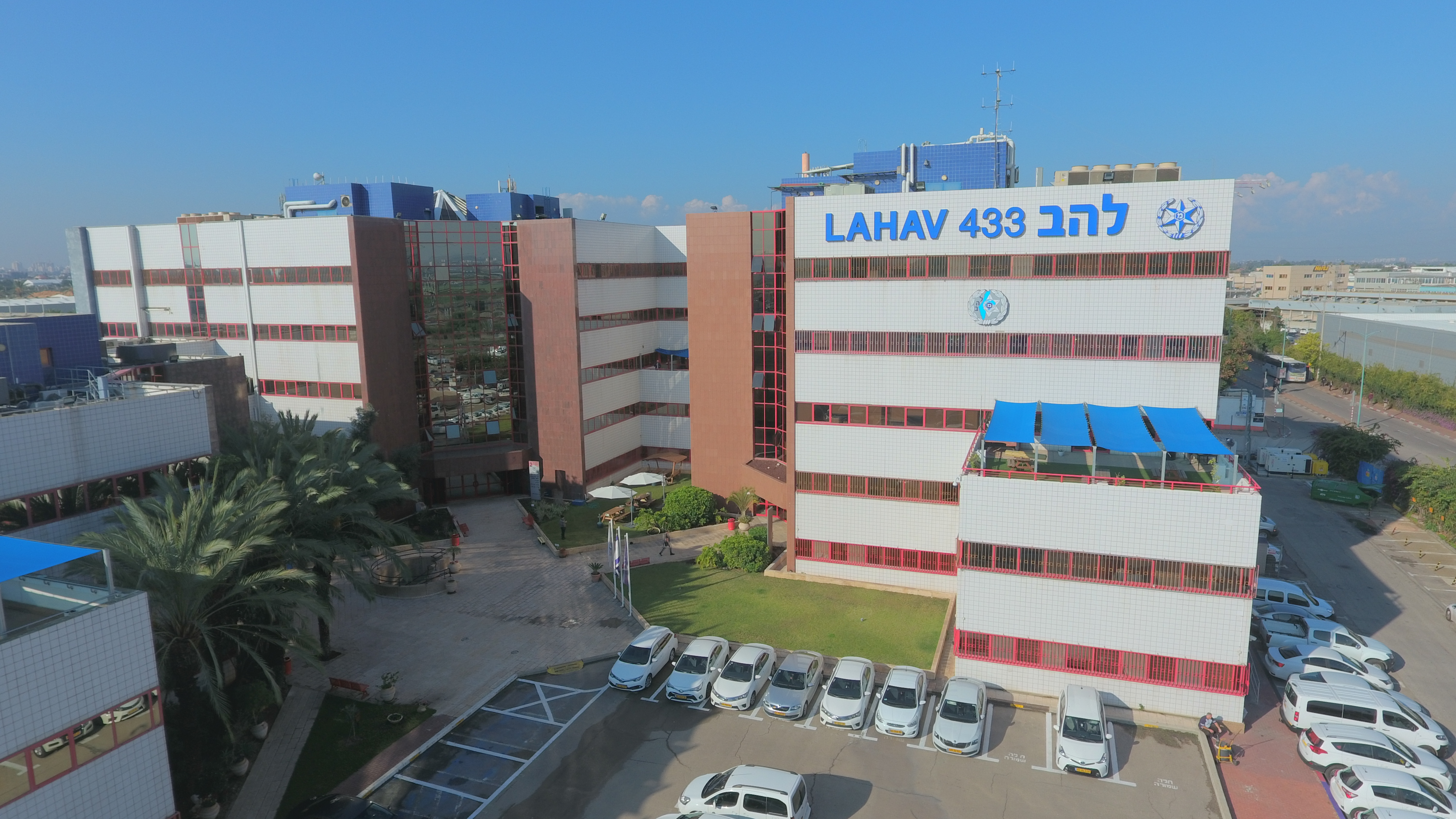
Lahav 433 HQ

It is tasked with investigating national crimes and corruption. It also investigates crimes such as murder and sexual assault.

The number four is for the four region departments that form the unit while the number 33 is for The Gideonites, a Mista'arvim unit. The Unit's Headquarters is located in the North Industrial Zone of Lod. The current chief commander is Yigal Ben Shalom, since March 2018.

== Structure ==
- National Cyber Crime Unit (Hebrew: סייבר)

- Child Online Protection Bureau (Hebrew: המטה הלאומי להגנה על ילדים ברשת) - Fights Cybercrimes done against minors. Also operates a hotline with the phone number 105, which receives reports about Cybercrimes against minors from the public.

- National Fraud Investigations Unit (Hebrew: יאח"ה, Yaha)
- Unit of International Crime Investigations (Hebrew: יחב"ל, Yahbal)
- National Financial Investigations Unit (Hebrew: יאל"כ, Yalak)
- National Unit for Locating Stolen Vehicles (Hebrew: אתג"ר, Etgar)
- National Unit for Prisons Guards' Investigations (Hebrew: יאח"ס, Yahs)
- The Gideonites – Mista'arvim unit

== Commanders ==
Name	Tenure
Yoav Segalovitz	January 2008 – January 2009
Yoram Ha-Levi	January – October 2009
David Mantzur	October 2009 – July 2012
Meni (Menachem) Yitzhaki	July 2012 – September 2013
Menashe Arbiv	September 2013 – February 2014
Vacant	February – August 2014
Roni Rittman	August 2014 – March 2018
Yigal Ben Shalom	March 2018 – Current
