= Roni Alsheikh =

Israeli intelligence officer and police commissioner

- רוני אלשיך
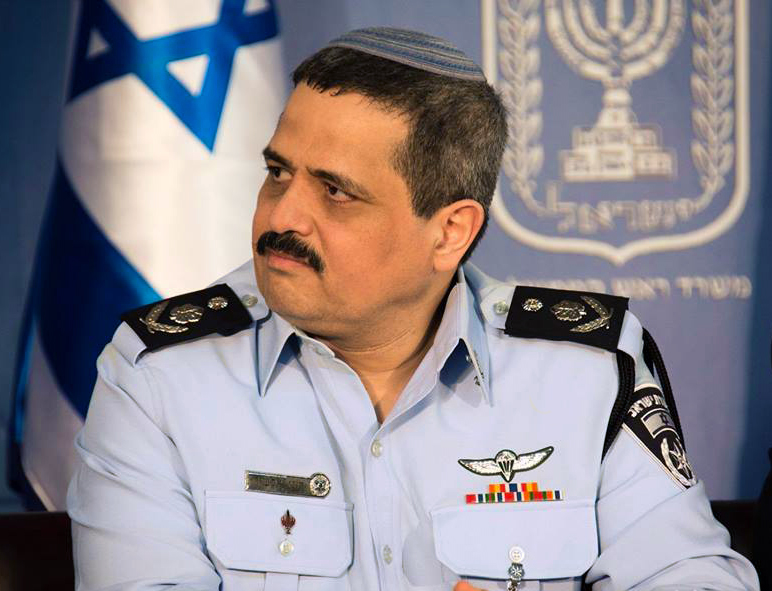
- Born: 20 March 1963 (age 63); Jerusalem
- Occupation: General Commissioner of Israel Police
- Military career
- Allegiance: Israel Defense Forces, Paratroopers; Shin Bet
- Service years: 1981–1988
- Rank: Police: Rav Nitzav (Commissioner) Army parallel - Rav Aluf (Lieutenant General)
- Conflicts: 1982 Lebanon War

Roni Alsheikh (or Roni Alsheich, Hebrew: רוני אלשיך; born 20 March 1963) is an Israeli former intelligence officer and head of the Israel Police. After serving as an officer in the Israel Defense Forces, Alsheikh joined Shin Bet and rose to become its deputy head before being appointed General Commissioner of the Israel Police, serving in the role from 2015 to 2018.

== Biography ==
Alsheikh was born in 1963 in Jerusalem. His father, Avraham Alsheikh, was a Yemenite-Jewish immigrant who came to Israel as part of Operation Magic Carpet, and his mother, Ahuva Amar, was born in Jerusalem to a family of Moroccan-Jewish origin. He lived in Jerusalem until age 8, when his family moved to Kiryat Arba, an Israeli settlement in the West Bank. In school, he was identified as a gifted child, and skipped three grades, transferring from the third to sixth grade. He attended the religious high school Netiv Meir in Jerusalem, and graduated at age 16. He was conscripted into the Israel Defense Forces in 1981 and joined the Paratroopers Brigade. Alsheikh went on the serve as a commander of the brigade's Engineer Company and as deputy-commander of the 50th battalion of the Nahal Brigade. Alsheikh fought in the 1982 Lebanon War, and participated in Operation Law and Order in 1988. He left the Israel Defense Forces in 1988 with the rank of Rav Seren (Major).

Alsheikh studied political science, earning a BA from the University of Haifa and an MA from Tel Aviv University, both of them summa cum laude. He studied for a master's degree in criminology at the Hebrew University of Jerusalem, and graduated from a senior management program at the Wharton School of the University of Pennsylvania. He also studied at the Mercaz HaRav Kook, a prominent yeshiva in Jerusalem.

Alsheikh joined the Shin Bet in December 1988, and was appointed deputy director in September 2014. In September 2015, Minister of Public Security, Gilad Erdan announced Alsheikh's nomination to be the 18th General Commissioner of the Israel Police. He served in the role for three years. During his time as Police Commissioner, he oversaw criminal investigations into then-Prime Minister Benjamin Netanyahu over corruption allegations. The investigations eventually resulted in the indictment and Trial of Benjamin Netanyahu. Alsheikh's term as Police Commissioner ended after three years. It was not extended to a fourth year as is usually customary. The refusal to extend his term was widely seen as an act of retaliation by Netanyahu over the corruption probes.

== NSO violations of civil rights ==
Alsheikh is implicated in starting an illegal surveillance program in the Israeli police and using undemocratic and illegal surveillance software to break into civilians phones and extracting information without the authorization of judges and without proper legislation. However, the subsequent Marari report found that in all the technological systems used for tapping communications between computers in the hands of the police that were examined, there was no indication that police operated to tap mobile phones without a judicial warrant. Also, no indication was found that it used NSO's Pegasus without a judicial warrant to penetrate the phones of the names published in Calcalist.

== Personal life ==
Alsheikh is married. He is the father of seven children, and is a grandfather. He currently resides in Givat Shmuel, having previously lived in the Israeli settlements of Kokhav HaShahar and Kiryat Arba.
