= Civil Guard (Israel) =

Civilian voluntary organization that supports the Police of Israel

The Civil Guard (Hebrew: המשמר האזרחי, romanized: Ha-Mishmar Ha-ʿEzraḥi), abbreviated in Hebrew as Mash'az (משא"ז) is a volunteer militia organization of Israeli citizens which assists in daily police work. It is a subdivision of the Israel Police.

== Organization ==
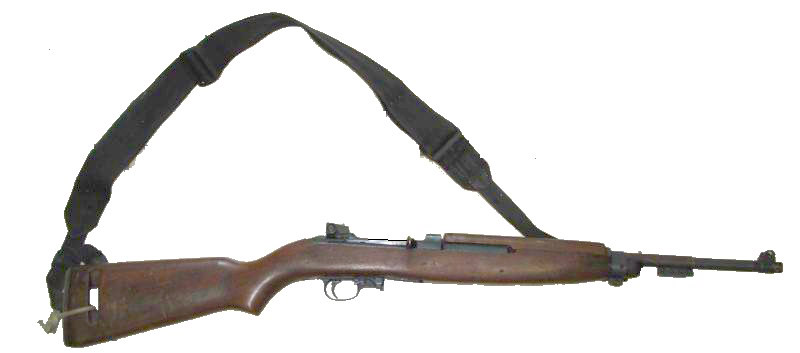
The M1 carbine with adjustable sights is used by both the Israeli Civil Guard and the Israeli police.

The Civil Guard is a division in the "Police and Community" branch of the Israel Police. The Civil Guard is managed and supported by the police which provide weapons, equipment, training and police officers who command local Civil Guard military bases (each community has one or more Civil Guard bases). Although the Civil Guard is operated by the police, its manpower consists mainly of civilian volunteers. Members are trained to provide the initial response to a security situation until regular police forces arrive. Most Civil Guard volunteers are armed with M1 carbines, or more recently, CAR-15 carbines, and personal handguns (if the member has a civilian gun license). The Civil Guard is composed mainly of volunteers who do patrols (in car or on foot). They go through basic training and have limited police powers while on duty. They may apprehend a suspected person or make an arrest if necessary.

Most volunteers manage about one shift a week (2 to 4+ hours), while the minimum requirement is 12 hours a month.

The Civil Guard's equipment generally consists of a fluorescent yellow police vest, flashlight, radio, firearm, handcuffs and whatever else may be required particular to the assignment. Equipment is returned at the end of the shift.

Within the Civil Guard there are two classifications who serve more often, the Matmid (מתמי"ד) volunteers give more of their time. Yatam (ית"מ) volunteers are mainly involved in traffic control. Both are more like volunteer police officers. They receive advanced training and wear police uniforms.

The Civil Guard also has specialized units such as bicycle riders, CBRN defense, civil affairs, civil engineering, clearance diver, communications, computer security, drivers, drone operators, electrical engineering, emergency management, emergency medical services, exercise medicine, firefighting, geological engineering, logistics, medical evacuation, mountaineering, pharmacy, public relations, search and rescue, sports medicine, surveillance, translators, and video creators, whose members have to go through additional training and have a higher level of commitment. The Civil Guard has disbanded its dune buggy, mounted, and sniper units.

== History ==
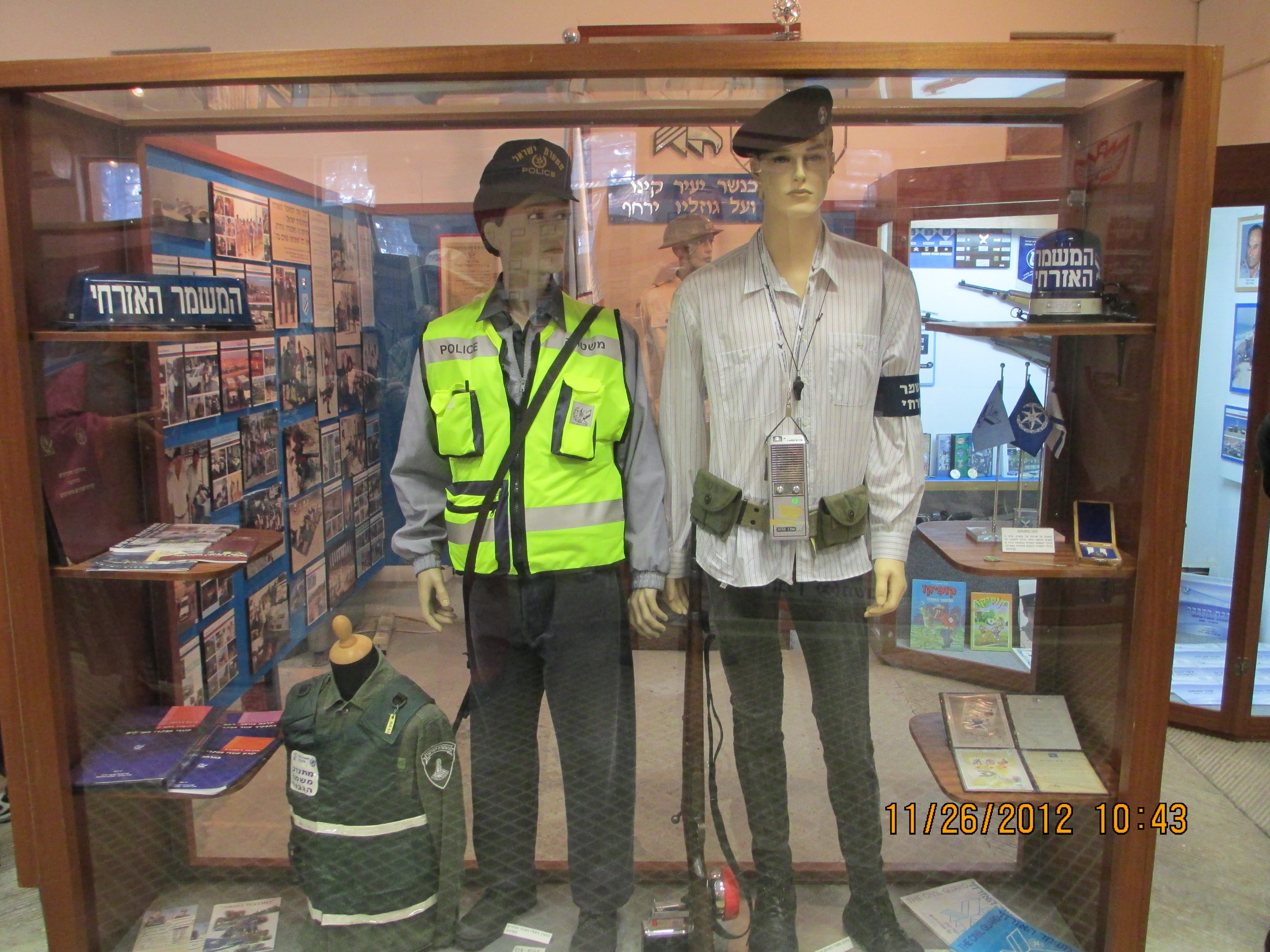
Civil Guard exhibition at the Police Training School in Kiryat Ata.

The Civil Guard was established on July 10, 1974 as a group of civilians volunteered to do night patrols in near-border neighborhoods, which were exposed to Palestinian terror attacks, and in particular following the Ma'alot massacre of May 15, 1974. Later, the focus was shifted from counterterrorism patrols to assist daily police work such as fighting crime and neighborhood violence.

In 2004, the Civil Guard reportedly had some 70,000 volunteers, 28% of them women. 20,000 new volunteers joined that year and 17,000 left the service. The typical volunteer profile is a 40- to 55-year-old upper-middle-class male, married with children. Due to the high level of required commitment, 20% of all volunteers quit during their first year of service. Between 1974–2004, over half a million citizens volunteered for the Civil Guard.

== See also ==
- Shomrim
- Town Watch
- Neighborhood Watch
- Nightwatch
- Israeli Security Forces
- Mishmeret Yesha
