= Israel Police =

Civilian police force of Israel

Israel Police משטרת ישראל شرطة إسرائيل
- Israel Police logo

- Israel Police flag

Agency overview
- Employees: 35,000
- Volunteers: 70,000
- Annual budget: 8.383 billion NIS (USD 2.24 billion) (2010)

Jurisdictional structure
- National agency: Israel
- Operations jurisdiction: Israel
- Governing body: Ministry of National Security
- General nature: Civilian police

Operational structure
- Overseen by: Police Internal Investigations Department
- Headquarters: National Headquarters of the Israel Police – Kiryat HaMemshala (East Jerusalem)
- Agency executive: Daniel Levi, Police Commissioner

Website
- www.police.gov.il

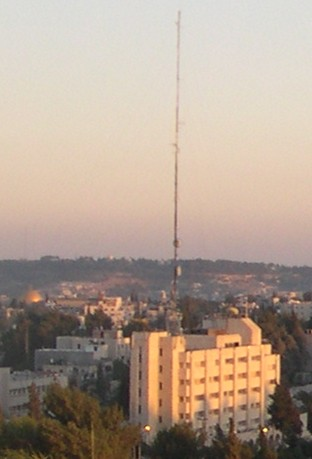
National Police Headquarters, Jerusalem

The Israel Police (Hebrew: משטרת ישראל, romanized: Mišteret Yisra'el; Arabic: شرطة إسرائيل, romanized: Shurtat Isrāʼīl) is the civilian police force of Israel. As with most other police forces in the world, its duties include crime fighting, traffic control, maintaining public safety, and counter-terrorism. It is under the jurisdiction of the Ministry of National Security. The National Headquarters of the Israel Police is located at Kiryat HaMemshala in Jerusalem.

The Israel Police operates throughout Israel, Area C of the West Bank, and the Golan Heights,—in all places in which Israel has civilian control. It is the sole civilian law enforcement agency in Israel: there are no municipal or regional police forces, though some municipalities employ bylaw enforcement officers who deal with low-level offenses and provide additional security and as such have the power to issue fines, but do not have police authority.

In an emergency, the police can be reached by dialing 100 from any telephone in Israel.

== History ==
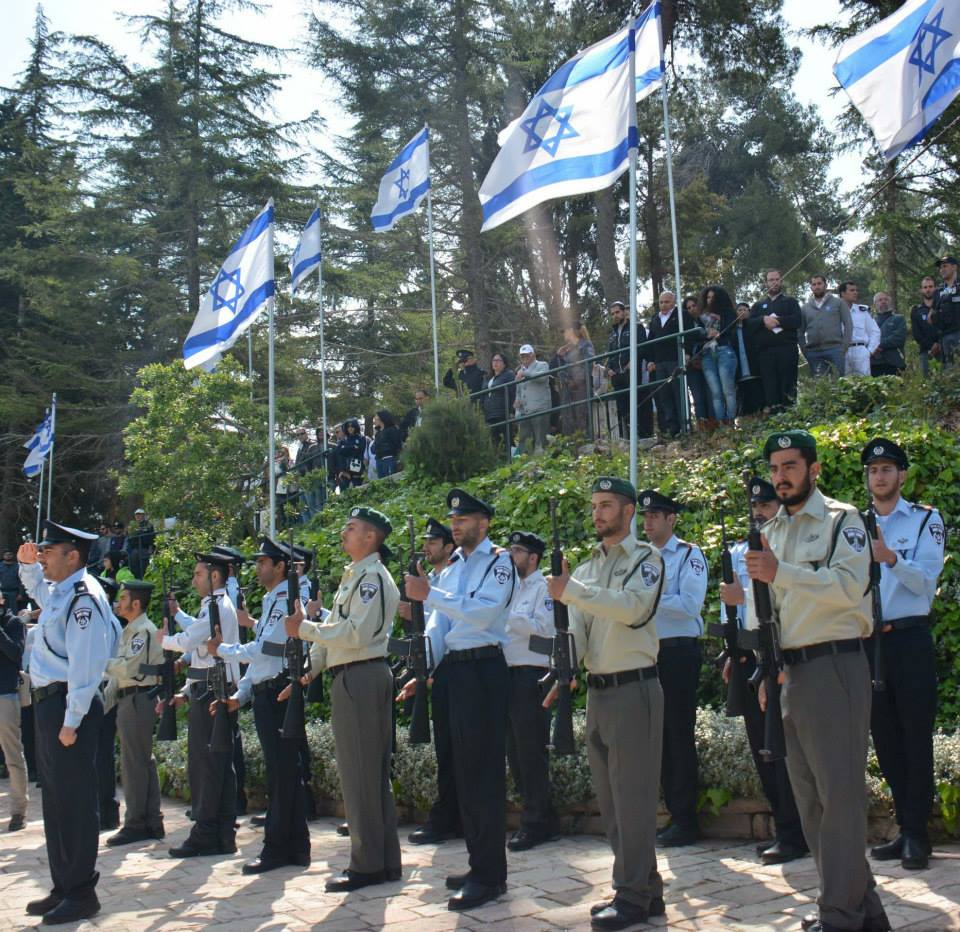
Honor guard of the Israeli Police and Border Police for Israel's Memorial Day

The Israel Police was established in 1948. It is responsible for public security, maintaining public order, securing public events and rallies, dismantling suspicious objects and explosives (EOD), riot and crowd control, law enforcement, crime fighting, detective work, covert operations against drug networks, investigating suspects, road traffic control, operating the Civil Guard, handling civilian complaints, handling youth violence, educational campaigns.

The Israel Police is a professional force, with some 35,000 persons on the payroll. There are also 70,000 Civil Guard volunteers who carry out part-time work in helping to police their own communities.

The police are divided into the following main divisional groups:

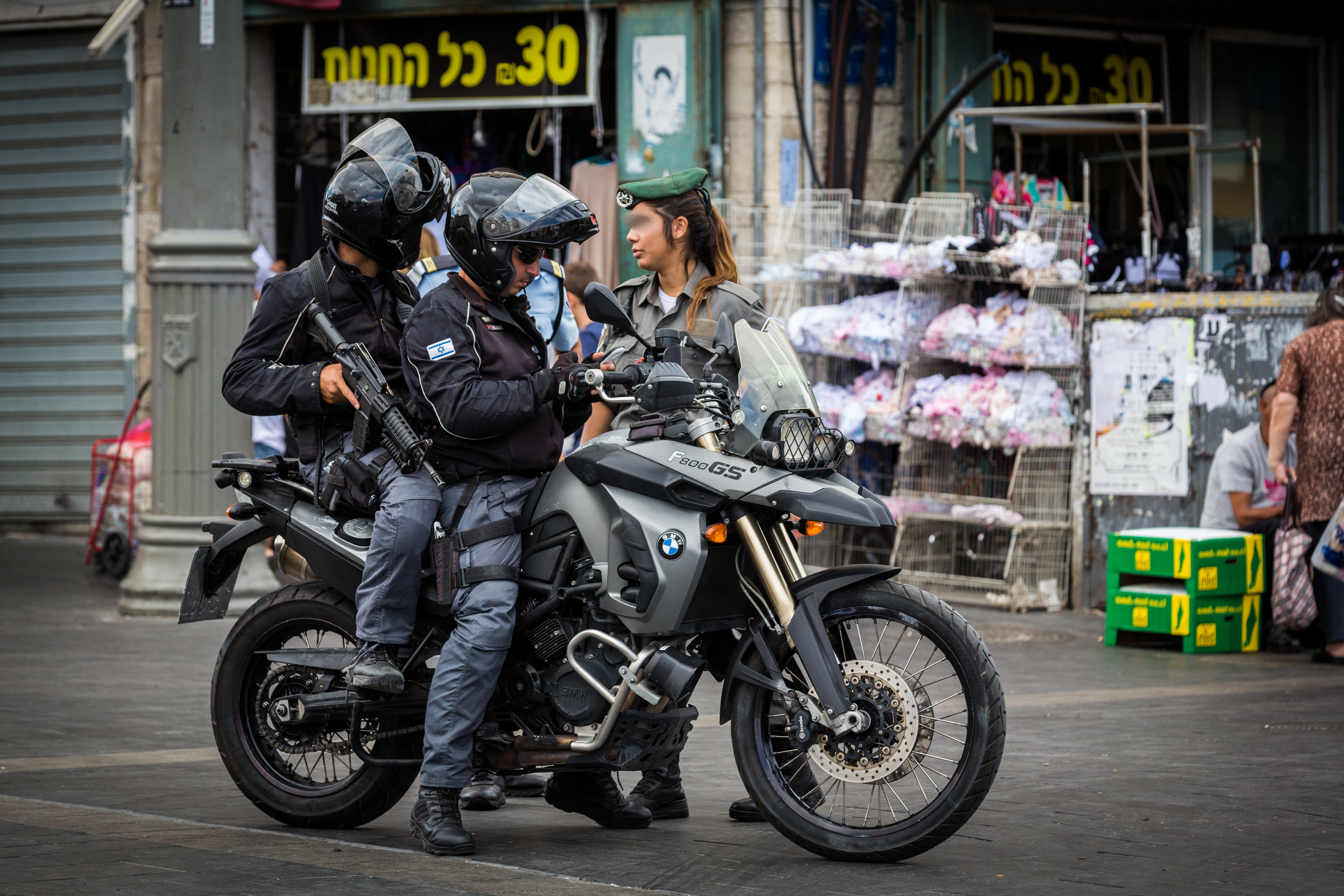
Israeli riot police, Yasam

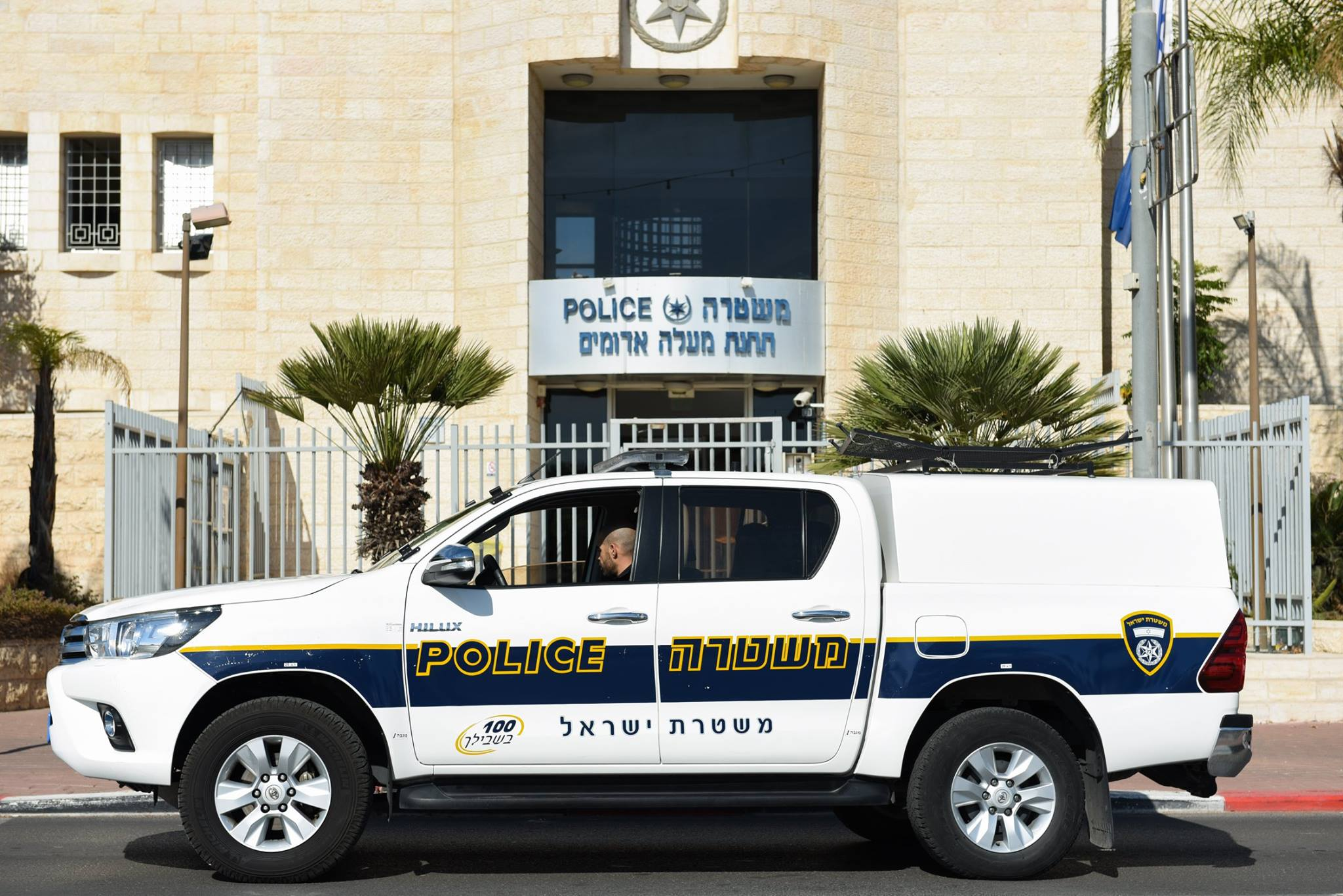
Toyota Hilux police vehicle

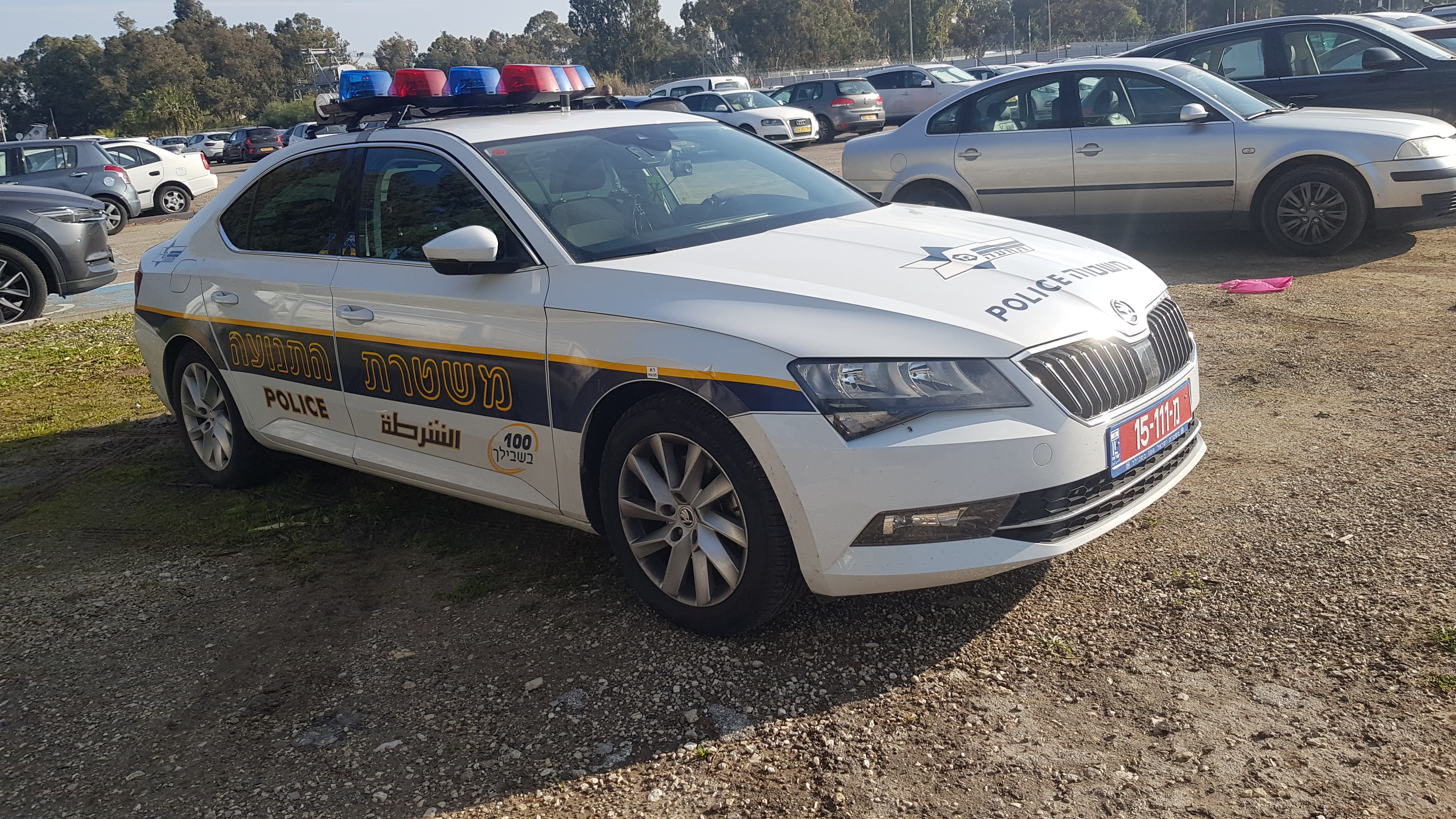
National Traffic Police patrol car

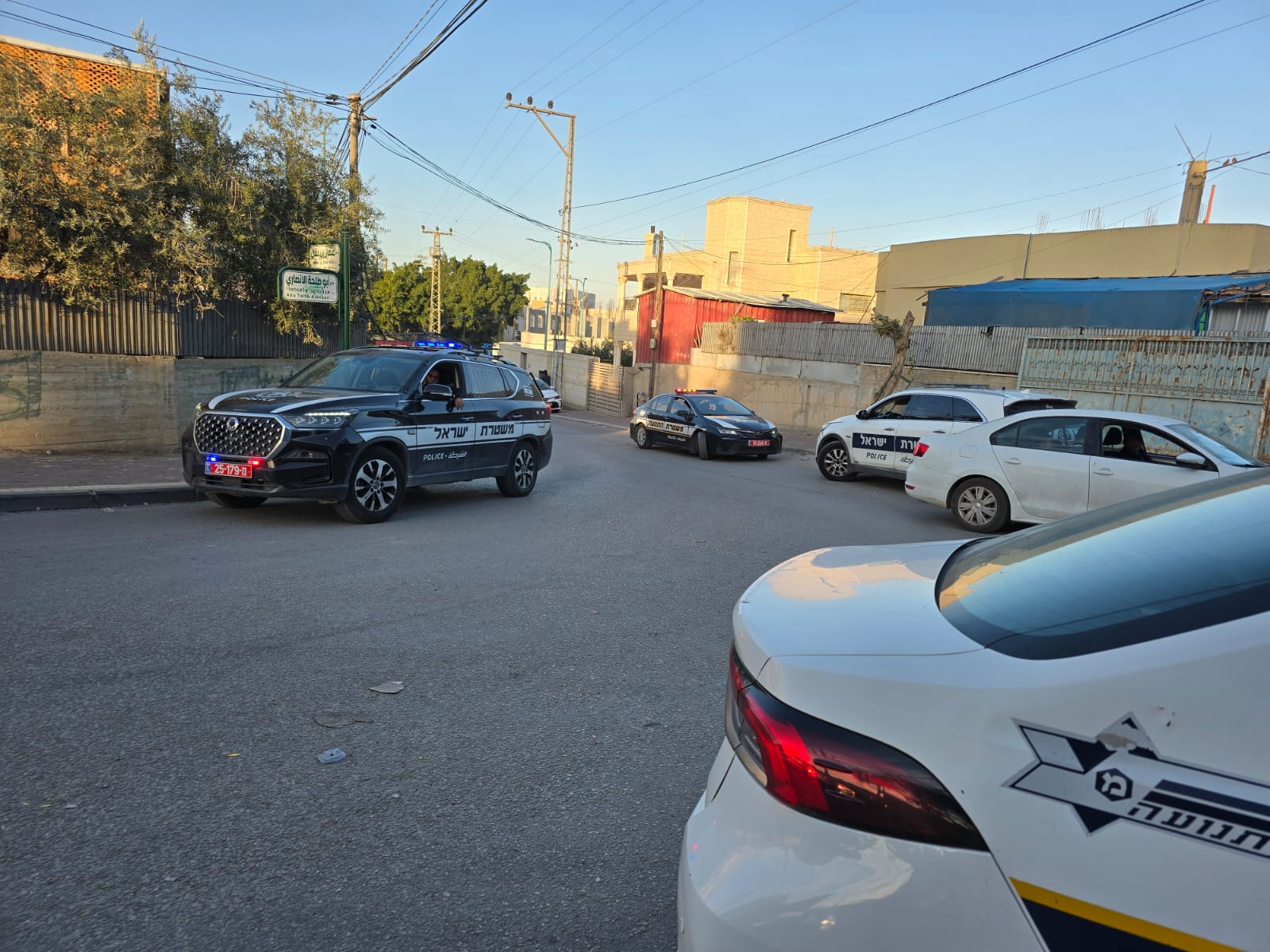
Israel Police patrol cars

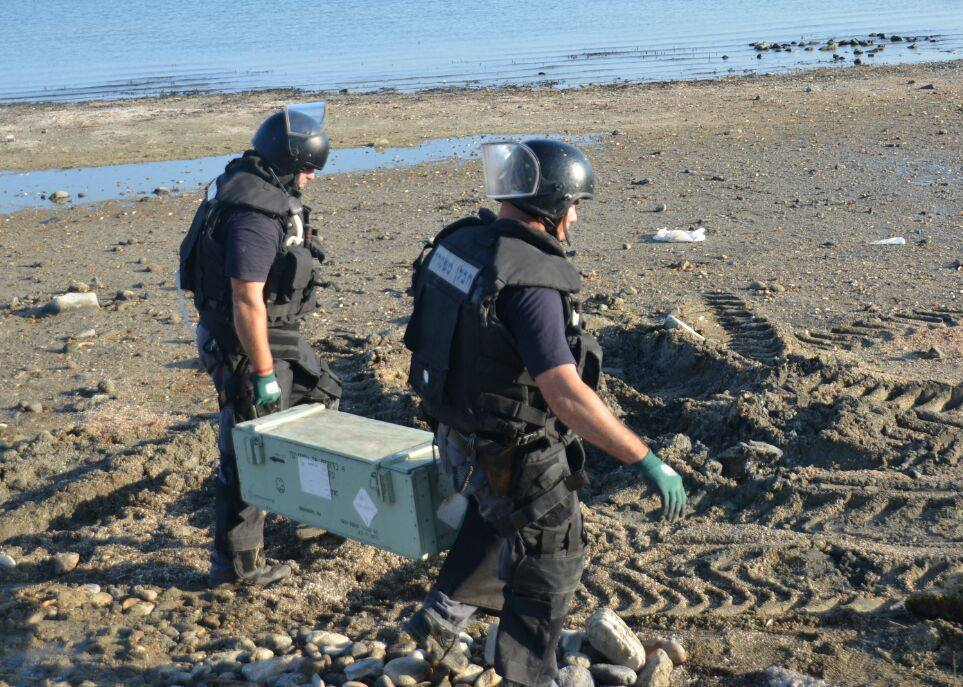
Israel Police bomb disposal operators

== Regional districts ==
The Israel Police is divided into six regional district commands:

- Central District
- Southern District
- Northern District
- Judea and Samaria District
- Tel Aviv District
- Jerusalem District
- Coastal District Police

== Operational units ==
- The Security and Community Policing Branch is responsible for ordinary law enforcement tasks such as conducting patrols in public and responding to emergency calls.
- The Israel Border Police ("MAGAV") is the combat arm of the police and mainly serves in specific areas – the borders, Jerusalem, and the West Bank. It is responsible for law enforcement in the rural countryside and for putting down civil unrest, particularly rioting. It participates in counter-terrorism operations. The Border Police has both professional officers on payroll and conscripts who serve in the Border Police as their mandatory three-year national service. It also has volunteer personnel. The Israel Border Police has four tactical units:
  - Yamam (National Counter-Terrorism Unit) - the police's counter-terrorism and hostage rescue unit. It is known as one of the most experienced and specialized units of its kind in the world. The unit has taken part in hundreds of operations in and outside the borders of Israel.
  - Yamas (Mista'arvim Unit) - a counter-terrorist commando unit. Its operators are trained in conducting operations undercover, disguised as civilians. Although officially part of the Border Police, it is directly subordinate to Shin Bet, the Israeli internal security service.
  - Samag (Tactical Counter-Crime and Counter-Terror Rapid Deployment Unit)
  - Matilan (Intelligence Gathering and Infiltrations Interception Unit)
- The Yasam (Special Patrol Unit) is a riot police and crowd control unit, and also participates in counter-terror operations. The unit, originally started as Riot Police, was called upon to assist with counter-terror operations, as well as dismantling settlements in accordance with Israeli court decisions. The Yasam has sub-units of Rapid Response Motorcycle Units.
- The National Traffic Police is the police's traffic enforcement arm. It is divided into five regional districts and a national patrol unit.
- The Civil Guard is the police's force of part-time volunteer officers, who comprise the majority of Israeli police officers. It is officially a division of the Security and Community Policing Branch. Civil Guard volunteers have limited police powers. They carry out patrols in public, are trained to provide the initial response to any security situation they encounter until regular police forces arrive, and partake in traffic control. The Civil Guard also has search and rescue teams.
- Lahav 433 is the police's unit for investigations of serious crimes and corruption.
- The Police SIGINT Unit is responsible for signals intelligence (SIGINT) activities.
- The Dog Handling Unit is responsible for operating police dogs.
- The Police Aerial Unit operates police helicopters.
- The Police Marine Unit is responsible for operating boats and has police divers.
- The Israel Police Bomb Disposal Unit is the bomb squad of the police. It deals with operations and investigations which involve suspicious objects, explosive devices or military ordnance.
- The Seif Unit is responsible for tackling crime in the Israeli-Arab population.
- The Yoav Unit is responsible for enforcement of land use and construction regulations in the Negev, particularly among Bedouin communities.
- The Division of Identification and Forensic Science is responsible for forensic science in investigations. It has laboratories dealing with latent fingerprint analysis, arson investigation, mass spectrometry and explosive analysis, digital evidence, DNA and other areas of biology, firearms, and questioned document examination.
- The Internal Investigations Department is responsible for investigating wrongdoing by police personnel. It is officially independent from the police and under the jurisdiction of the Justice Ministry.

== Weapons and equipment ==
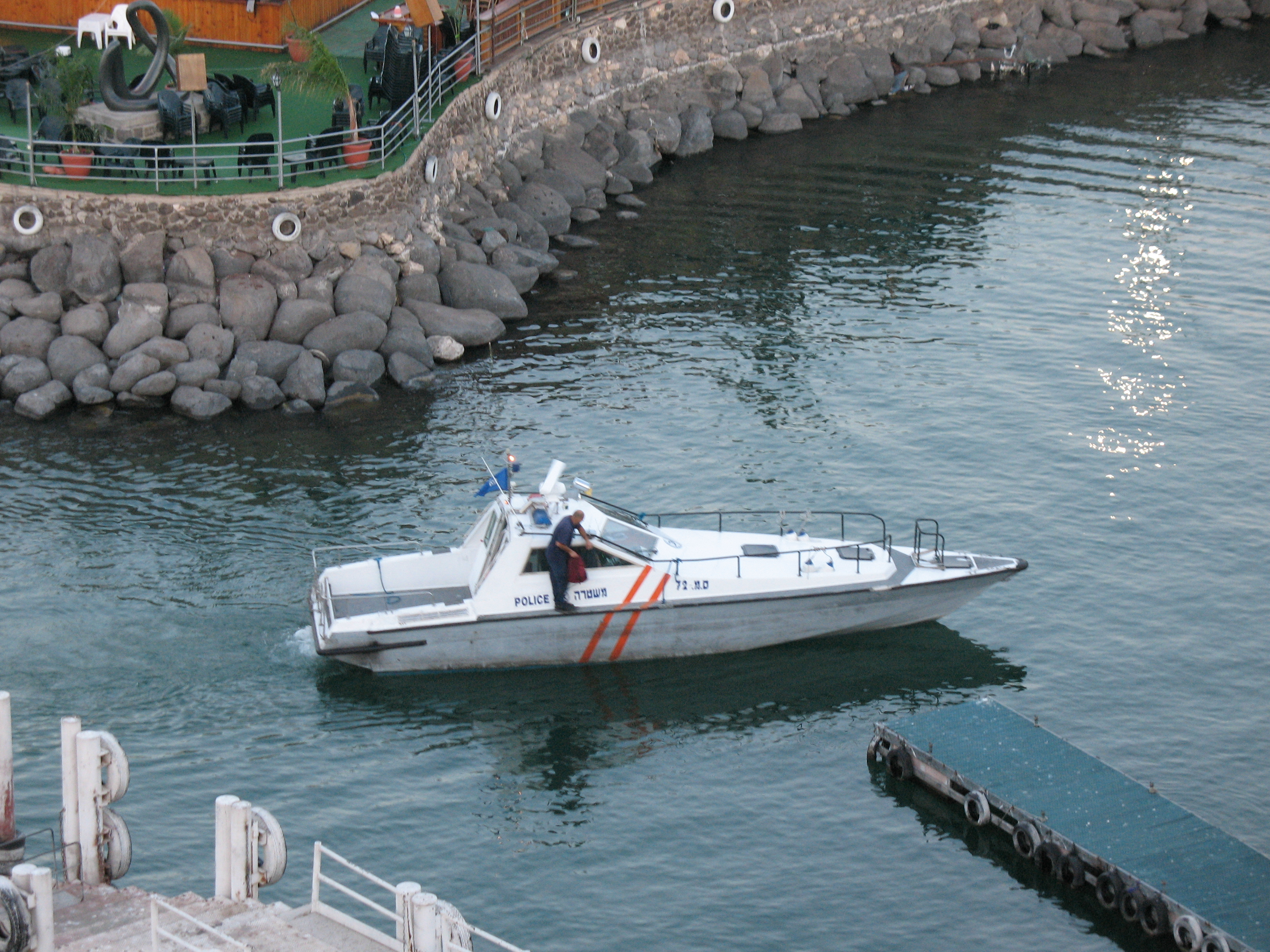
Israeli police boat on the Sea of Galilee

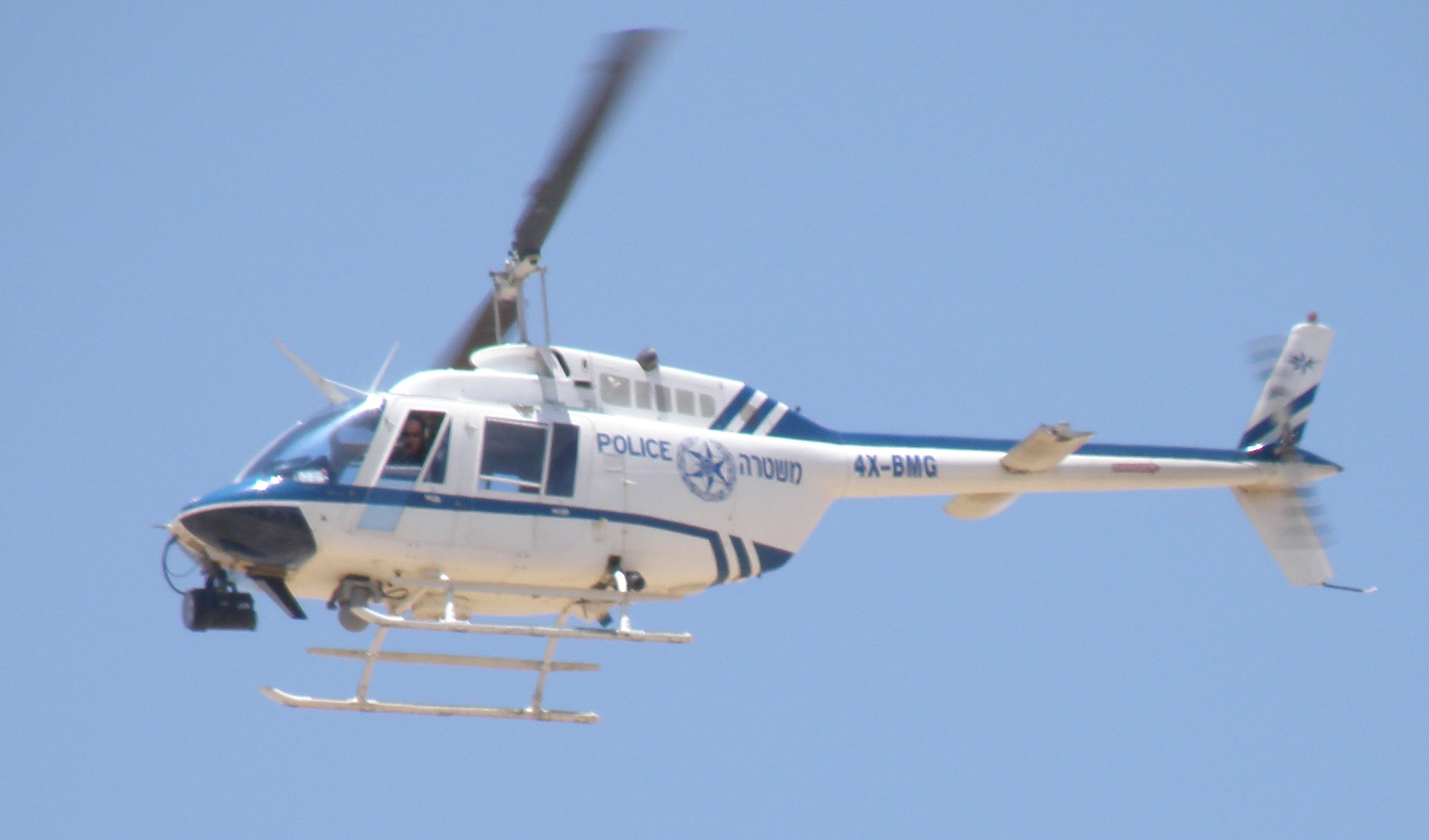
An Israeli Police Bell 206 helicopter

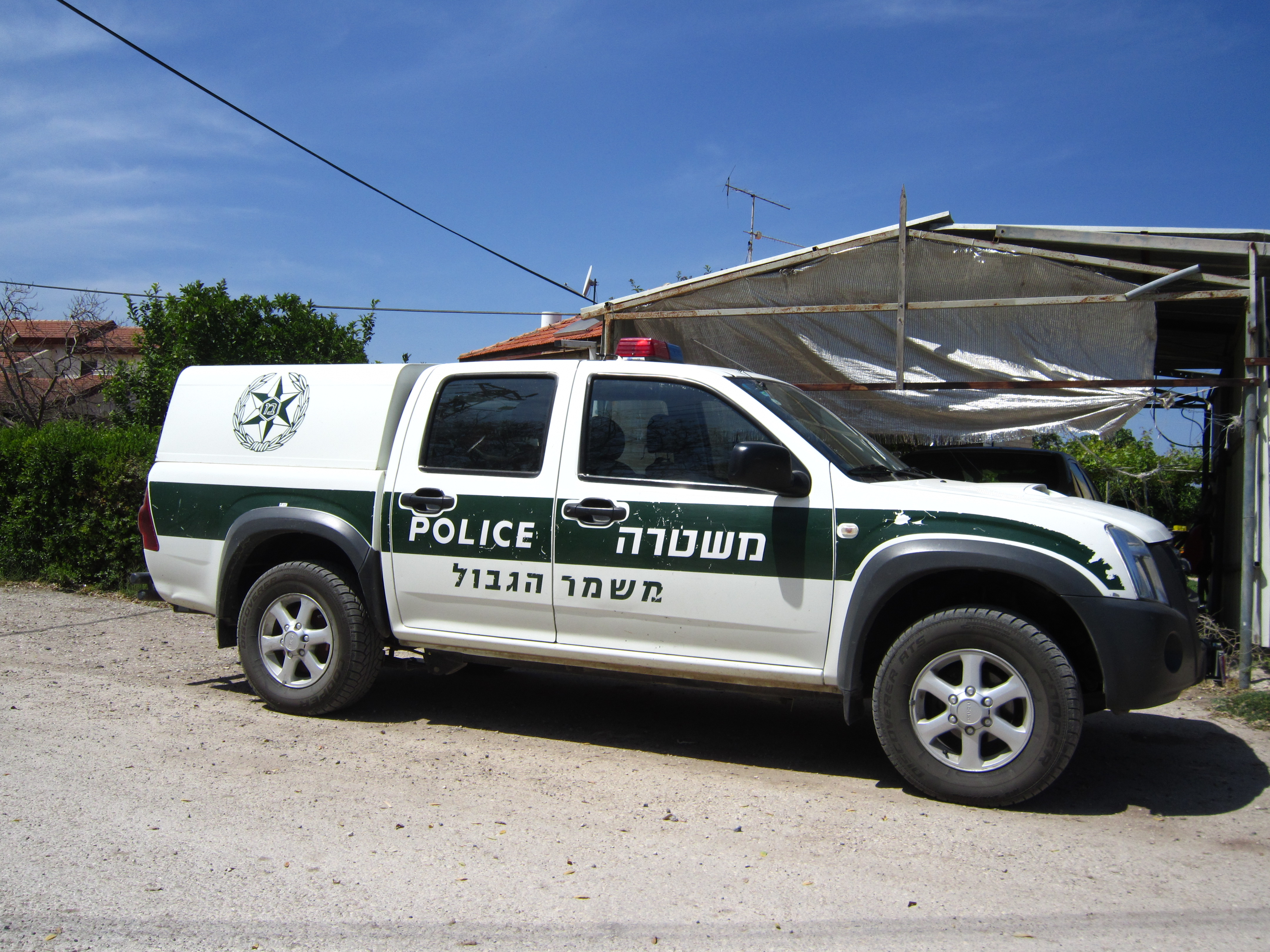
Israel Border Police vehicle

Each patrol officer is armed with a pistol (handgun) which he or she usually also carries while off duty. Also, each patrol car must have at least one long-arm (i.e. rifle). Police volunteers are usually armed with an M1 Carbine, which they return to the armory after they finish their duty (they do not take the rifle home, but may sign one out for escorting field trips, etc.). Volunteers who have a gun license may use their own personal handgun as a personal defense weapon while on duty, under the condition that the gun and ammunition type is authorized by the police (9 mm). Common pistols owned and carried by volunteers include Glock and CZ-75 designs.

Specialized armaments such as automatic rifles, bolt-action rifles and non-lethal weapons are assigned according to activity and not on personal basis. Border Guard personnel, however, carry an M16 or M4 rifle as a standard personal weapon and can carry it home while off duty (like regular infantry in the Israel Defense Forces).

== Ranks ==
| English language equivalent | (Hebrew) | Rank | Insignia |
Enlisted
| Constable | שוטר | Shoter | |
| Corporal | רב שוטר | Rav Shoter | |
| Sergeant | סמל שני | Samal Sheni | |
| Staff Sergeant | סמל ראשון | Samal Rishon | |
| Sergeant First Class | רב סמל | Rav Samal | |
| Master Sergeant | רב סמל ראשון | Rav Samal Rishon | |
| First Sergeant | רב סמל מתקדם | Rav Samal Mitkadem | |
| Sergeant Major | רב סמל בכיר | Rav Samal Bakhir | |
| Command Sergeant Major | רב נגד | Rav Nagad | |
Officer
| Sub-Inspector | מפקח משנה | Mefake'ah Mishneh | |
| Inspector | מפקח | Mefake'ah | |
| Chief Inspector | פקד | Pakad | |
| Superintendent | רב פקד | Rav Pakad | |
| Chief Superintendent | סגן ניצב | Sgan Nitzav | |
| Commander | ניצב משנה | Nitzav Mishneh | |
| Assistant Commissioner | תת ניצב | Tat Nitzav | |
| Deputy Commissioner | ניצב | Nitzav | |
| Commissioner | רב ניצב | Rav Nitzav | |

== Awards and recognition ==
- On July 6, 2004, the Israel Police received an award from the Anti-Defamation League for its counter-terror efforts and for passing seminars of counter-terror measures to the FBI and local police in the US.
- In October 2010, YAMAM, the counter-terrorism unit of the Israeli Police, won the "Urban Shield" SWAT competition held by the Alameda County Sheriff's Office, setting a new record in the competition.
- In October 2011, YAMAM won the "Urban Shield" SWAT competition held by the Alameda County Sheriff's Office a second time.

== General Commissioners ==
Flag of the Chief of Israel Police

Police Commissioners
| General Commissioner | Start year | End year |
|---|---|---|
| Yehezkel Sahar | 1948 | 1958 |
| Yosef Nachmias | 1958 | 1964 |
| Pinhas Kopel | 1964 | 1972 |
| Aaron Sela | 1972 | |
| Shaul Rosolio | 1972 | 1976 |
| Haim Tavori | 1976 | 1979 |
| Herzl Shapir | 1980 | |
| Arieh Ivtsan | 1981 | 1985 |
| David Kraus | 1985 | 1990 |
| Yaakov Turner | 1990 | 1993 |
| Rafi Peled | 1993 | 1994 |
| Asaf Hefetz | 1994 | 1997 |
| Yehuda Vilk | 1998 | 2000 |
| Shlomo Aharonishki | 2001 | 2004 |
| Moshe Karadi | 2004 | 2007 |
| Dudi Cohen | 2007 | 2011 |
| Yohanan Danino | 2011 | 2015 |
| Bentsi Sao (interim) | 2015 | 2015 |
| Roni Alsheikh | 2015 | 2018 |
| Motti Cohen | 2018 | 2020 |
| Kobi Shabtai | 2020 | 2024 |
| Avshalom Peled (interim) | 2024 | 2024 |
| Daniel Levi | 2024 | |

== Women police ==
In 2015, the editorial of Haaretz claimed "Women constitute at least 30 percent of the police force" and criticized there were no women who have reached the rank of major general.

== Controversies ==
A 2014 analysis by Yesh Din questioned the professionalism of the police force of the Judea and Samaria District (also known as the West Bank) as only 7.4% of reported attacks by Israeli citizens on Palestinian persons and property had led to indictments. In 2015, several senior officers resigned due to criminal investigations or accusations of sexual harassment of employees. Five police officers at the rank of major general resigned in the preceding 18 months amid scandal. The February 2015 announcement that another senior Israel Police officer was under investigation for sexual harassment was criticized by women's and rape victim advocacy groups, who held protests at police headquarters in a number of cities.

An ongoing Israeli programme of inviting U.S. police groups to study Israeli policework in sponsored visits has been the object of controversy for several years.

== See also ==
- Israel Border Police - the combat branch of the Israeli Police
- YAMAM - Israel's National Counter-Terror Unit
- Lahav 433
- Palestinian Civil Police Force
- Administration of Border Crossings, Population and Immigration
- Law enforcement by country
