= Absalom (disambiguation) =

Absalom (Avshalom) is a son of King David in the Old Testament.

Absalom, Absalon, Absolem, Absolon or Avshalom may also refer to:

== Places ==
- Avshalom, Israel, a communal settlement in southern Israel
- Avshalom, Sinai, a former Israeli settlement in the Sinai Peninsula
- Mount Absalom, Antarctica
- Yad Avshalom, an ancient tomb in the Kidron Valley near Jerusalem

== Arts and entertainment ==
- Absalom (2000 AD), a 2000 AD character and eponymous series spun off from Caballistics Inc. (2011)
- Absalom (comics), a Marvel Comics character (1992)
- Absalom (One Piece), a fictional character in Eiichirō Oda's manga One Piece (1997)
- Absolon (film), a 2003 science fiction film
- Absolem the Caterpillar, a character in Tim Burton's 2010 film Alice in Wonderland
- Absalom, a fictional character in Cry, The Beloved Country by Alan Paton (1948)
- "Absalom", a science fiction story by Henry Kuttner anthologized in the collection Tomorrow, the Stars (1952)
- Absalom, a 2009 play by Zoe Kazan
- Absalom, a major city in the setting used by the Pathfinder Roleplaying Game

== Other uses ==
- Absalom (1853), a wooden ketch
- Absalom (name), including a list of people with either the given name or the surname
- Royal Danish Navy ships named HDMS Absalon

== See also ==
- Absalom, Absalom! (1936), a novel by William Faulkner
