= Absalon (disambiguation) =

Absalon (c. 1128–1201) was a Danish archbishop and statesman.

Absalon may also refer to:

- Absalon-class support ship, a 2004 class of ship of the Royal Danish Navy
  - HDMS Absalon (L16)
- Absalom (name) or Absalon
- Avessalom or Absalon, a Russian male given name
- Absalon, Martinique, a populated place in Martinique
- Absalon, code name for a unit in Operation Gladio
- Absalon (artist) (1964–1993), Israeli-French artist and sculptor
- Julien Absalon (born 1980), French mountain biker

== See also ==
- Absalom (disambiguation)
- Epsilon
