= The Cold Light of Day =

The Cold Light of Day or Cold Light of Day may refer to:

- The Cold Light of Day (2012 film), an American espionage action thriller
- The Cold Light of Day, a 1996 film directed by Rudolf van den Berg and a remake of Es geschah am hellichten Tag
- Cold Light of Day (1989 film), a 1989 British film (see 47th Venice International Film Festival)

== See also ==
- Light of Day, a 1987 American drama film
