= Absalom (name) =

- Pronunciation: /ˈæbsələm/ AB-sə-ləm
- Gender: masculine
- Language: Hebrew

Origin
- Meaning: "father of peace"

Other names
- See also: Axel

Absalom (Hebrew: אַבְשָלוֹם, Modern: ʼAvšalōm, Tiberian: ʼAḇšālōm, "father of peace"; Biblical Greek: Αβεσσαλωμ) is a masculine first name from the Old Testament, where Absalom is a son of King David.

The variant Avishalom (Hebrew: אֲבּישָׁלוֹם, Modern: ʼAvīšalōm, Tiberian: ʼĂḇīšālōm, "my father is peace") is used as the name of the father-in-law of Rehoboam in 1 Kings (15:2,10), who in 2 Chronicles 11:20,21 is referred to by the shorter form Avshalom. The modern Scandinavian first name, Axel, has developed (via Axelen) from Absalon, a 12th-century Danish archbishop and statesman. The variant Absolon is a German surname.

The name was also used in medieval England (variants Absolon, Apsolon, and Abselon). As in the biblical story, as Absalom was pursuing his father, King David, in the forest of Ephraim and had his long hair caught in a tree, the name appears to have been a nickname for a man with long or thick hair, as suggested by a passage in the Canterbury Tales,

Now was ther of that Chirche a parish clerk, The which that was ycleped Absolon ... Curl was his heer and as the gold it shoon.

— "The Miller's Tale"

This use as a nickname is possibly also the origin of Absalom as an English surname. The name Absalom continued to be used in English Protestantism in the 18th and 19th centuries.

The Hebrew name was used among Palestinian Jews in the 19th to early 20th centuries and remains current in Israel; it is mostly anglicized as Avshalom, reflecting Modern Hebrew pronunciation.

== First name ==
Absalom

- Absalom (c. 100 BC), a son of Jewish High Priest John Hyrcanus
- Absalom Shade Allan (1843 – after 1901), Canadian merchant and politician
- Absalom Baird (1824–1905), Union Army general in the American Civil War
- Absalom Boston (1785–1855), American businessman and captain
- Absalom Harris Chappell (1801–1878), American politician and lawyer
- Absalom Dlamini (born 1984), Swazi footballer
- Absalom Themba Dlamini (born 1950), former Prime Minister of Eswatini
- Absalom Greeley (1823–1885), Canadian politician
- Absalom J. Hembree (1813–1856), American soldier and politician
- Absalom Iimbondi (born 1991), Namibian footballer
- Absalom Jones (1746–1818), African American abolitionist and clergyman
- Absalom Jordan (1840–1888), American Civil War soldier
- Absalom Koiner (1824–1920), American lawyer and politician
- Absalom Willis Robertson (1887–1971), American politician
- Absalom P. Rowe (1817–1900), American politician from Virginia
- Absalom Shabangu (born 1952), Swazi weightlifter
- Absalom Shade (c. 1793 – 1862), Canadian businessman and politician
- Absalom Sydenstricker (1852–1931), American Presbyterian missionary
- Absalom Tatom (1742–1802), American politician
- Absalom Austin Townsend (1810–1888), early pioneer of SW Wisconsin and founder of Rough and Ready, CA. WI state politician.
- Absalom Watkin (1787–1861), English political reformer
- Absalom Holbrook Wingo, known as Al Wingo (1898–1964), American baseball player

Absalon/Absolon

- Absalon (c. 1128 – 1201), a Danish archbishop and statesman
- Absolon Stumme (died 1499), German painter

Avishalom/Avshalom

- Avishalom, the father-in-law of King Rehoboam of Judah
- Avshalom Caspi (born 1960), Israeli-American psychologist
- Avishalom Drori (1915-1985), Israeli aviation pioneer, World War II commando, English teacher, and hypnotist
- Avshalom Elitzur (born 1957), Israeli physicist and philosopher
- Avshalom Feinberg (1889–1917), Jewish spy for Britain in World War I
- Avshalom Haviv (1926–1947), one of the Olei Hagardom
- Avshalom Gissin (1896-1921), Ottoman Army officer and Zionist pioneer
- Avshalom Kor (born 1950), Israeli linguist
- Avshalom Peled (born 1961), Israeli senior police commander
- Avshalom Pollak (born 1970), Israeli actor and director
- Avshalom Vilan (born 1951), Israeli politician and economist

== Surname ==
Absalom
Origin
- Region of origin: England

Other names
- Variant forms: Asplen, Aspling, Ashplant; Absolon

"Absalom" is a rare English surname, recorded as early as the 13th century. It derives from the first name Absalom, which became popular in England in the 12th century. The surname remained rare throughout its existence, but it gave rise to a number of variants, such as Asplen, and via the latter, Aspling and Ashplant.

The variant Absolon is found in England as well as in France and Germany, reaching Central Europe in the late medieval period, so that Absolon (feminine Absolonová) is now also a Czech and Slovak surname.

Absalom

- Henry W.L. Absalom, a member of the Scientific Committee on the Commonwealth Trans-Antarctic Expedition of 1955–58, eponymous of Mount Absalom in Antarctica.
- Jack Absalom (1927–2019), Australian artist
- Mike Absalom (born 1940), English folk singer-songwriter
- Ted Absolom (1875–1927), Australian rules footballer.
- Joe Absolom (1978), English film actor

Absolon

- John Absolon (1815–1895), British watercolor painter
- Karel Absolon (1877–1960), Czech archaeologist, geographer, palaeontologist, and speleologist
- Karla Absolonová-Bufková (1855–1941), Czech writer, ethnographer and folklorist
- Andrea Absolonová (1976–2004), Czech diver, and pornographic actress known as Lea De Mae
- Milada Absolonová, Czechoslovak slalom canoeist
- Monika Absolonová (born 27 1976), Czech singer and actress
- Philip Absolon (born 1960), British artist and a founder member of the Stuckists
