= Ramsay Wedge =

Ramsay Wedge (80°26′S 25°43′W) is a narrow rock spur, 2 nautical miles (3.7 km) long, with talus slopes rising to about 1,200 m, located 2 nautical miles (3.7 km) southwest of Mount Absalom in the southwest portion of the Herbert Mountains, Shackleton Range. Photographed from the air by the U.S. Navy, 1967, and surveyed by British Antarctic Survey (BAS), 1968–71. In association with the names of glacial geologists grouped in this area, named by the United Kingdom Antarctic Place-Names Committee (UK-APC) after Sir Andrew C. Ramsay (1814–91), Scottish geologist who first recognized the glacial origin of rock basins in 1862; Director-General, Geological Survey of Great Britain, 1871–81.
