= Geikie Nunatak =

Antarctic Mountain

Geikie Nunatak (80°24′S 25°52′W) is a nunatak 3 nautical miles (6 km) west of Mount Absalom in the southwestern end of the Herbert Mountains of the Shackleton Range, Antarctica. It was photographed from the air by the U.S. Navy in 1967, and surveyed by the British Antarctic Survey, 1968–71. In association with the names of glacial geologists grouped in this area, it was named by the UK Antarctic Place-Names Committee in 1971 after James Geikie, Professor of Geology at the University of Edinburgh from 1882, who was one of the first to recognize that multiple glaciations occurred during the Pleistocene period.
