= 47th Venice International Film Festival =

1990 film festival in Italy

- Festival poster
- Location: Venice, Italy
- Founded: 1932
- Awards: Golden Lion: Rosencrantz & Guildenstern Are Dead
- Artistic director: Guglielmo Biraghi
- Festival date: 4 – 14 September 1990
- Website: Website

Venice Film Festival chronology
- 48th 46th

The 47th annual Venice International Film Festival was held from 4 to 14 September 1990.

American writer Gore Vidal was the Jury President of the main competition.

The Golden Lion winner was Rosencrantz & Guildenstern Are Dead directed by Tom Stoppard.

== Jury ==
The following people comprised the 1990 jury:

- Gore Vidal, American writer - Jury President
- María Luisa Bemberg, Argentine filmmaker and actress
- Edoardo Bruno, Italian film critic
- Gilles Jacob, French film critic
- Alberto Lattuada, Italian director
- Kira Muratova, Soviet filmmaker
- Omar Sharif, Egyptian actor
- Ula Stöckl, West German filmmaker and actress
- Anna-Lena Wibom, Swedish film producer

== Official Sections ==
The following films were selected to be screened:

=== In Competition ===
English title	Original title	Director(s)	Production country
The African Woman	Die Rückkehr	Margarethe von Trotta	West Germany, Italy
An Angel at My Table		Jane Campion	New Zealand, Australia, United Kingdom, United States
Boys on the Outside	Ragazzi fuori	Marco Risi	Italy
Collapse	Raspad	Mikhail Belikov	Soviet Union
Farewell to Autumn	Pozegnanie jesieni	Mariusz Trelinski	Poland
The Gamblers	Spieler	Dominik Graf	West Germany
Goodfellas		Martin Scorsese	United States
I Hired a Contract Killer		Aki Kaurismäki	Finland, Sweden
Karartma geceleri		Yusuf Kurcenly	Turkey
Laura Adler's Last Love Affair	אהבתה האחרונה של לורה אדלר	Avraham Heffner	Israel
Martha and I	Marta a já	Jiri Weiss	Czechoslovakia, West Germany
Mo' Better Blues		Spike Lee	United States
The Moon in the Mirror	La luna en el espejo	Silvio Caiozzi	Chile
Mr. & Mrs. Bridge		James Ivory	United Kingdom
No Fear, No Die	S'en fout la mort	Claire Denis	France
The Only Witness	Edinstveniyat svidetel	Mikhail Pandoursky	Bulgaria
Rosencrantz & Guildenstern Are Dead		Tom Stoppard	United Kingdom
Sirup		Helle Ryslinge	Denmark
Tales of a Golden Geisha	あげまん	Juzo Itami	Japan
Traces of an Amorous Life	Tracce di vita amorosa	Peter Del Monte	Italy
Walls	Mathilukal	Adoor Gopalakrishnan	India

=== Out of Competition ===
English title	Original title	Director(s)	Production country
Blood Oath		Stephen Wallace	Australia
The Company of Strangers		Cynthia Scott	Canada
Dancin' Thru the Dark		Mike Ockrent	United Kingdom
The Dandelions	I taràssachi	Francesco Ranieri Martinotti, Rocco Mortelliti, Fulvio Ottaviano	Italy
Dick Tracy		Warren Beatty	United States
Every Other Weekend	Un week-end sur deux	Nicole Garcia	France
Henry and June		Philip Kaufman	United States
Romeo.Juliet		Armando Acosta	Belgium
See You in Hell, Friends	Dovidenia v pekle, prijatelia	Juraj Jakubisko	Czechoslovakia, Italy
Shakha Proshakha		Satyajit Ray	India
There Were Days... and Moons	Il y a des jours... et des lunes	Claude Lelouch	France

=== Fuoridiprogramma ===
English title	Original title	Director(s)	Production country
I, the Worst of All	Yo, la peor de todas	María Luisa Bemberg	Argentina
Basta! Adesso tocca a noi		Luciano Emmer	Italy
The Rainbow Thief		Alejandro Jodorowsky	United Kingdom
Jesus Christ's Horoscope	Jézus Krisztus horoszkópja	Miklós Jancsó	Hungary
Documents
Echoes from a Sombre Empire	Echos aus einem düsteren Reich	Werner Herzog	Germany, France
Flight from Paradise	Fuga dal paradiso	Ettore Pasculli	Italy, France, Spain, Germany
Hollywood Mavericks		Florence Dauman, Dale Ann Stieber	United States
Made in Milan		Martin Scorsese	United States
Requiem for Dominic	Requiem für Dominik	Robert Dornhelm	Austria
Tribute to Curt Bois
Mutterliebe (1909)		unknown	Germany
Klebolin klebt Alles (1909)		Heinrich Bolten-Baeckers	Germany

== Independent Sections ==
=== Venice International Film Critics' Week ===
The following feature films were selected to be screened as In Competition for this section:

English title	Original title	Director(s)	Production country
Boom Boom		Rosa Vergés	Spain
Cold Light of Day		Fhiona Louise	United Kingdom
December	Dicembre	Antonio Monda	Italy
La Discrète		Christian Vincent	France
He’s Still There		Halfdan O. Hussie	United States
Under a Sky of Blue	Pod nebom golubym	Vitaliy Dudin	Soviet Union
The Station	La Stazione	Sergio Rubini	Italy
Winckelmann's Travels	Winckelmanns Reisen	Jan Schütte	West Germany
Tribute to Michael Powell
The Edge of the World (1937)		Michael Powell	United Kingdom
Riviera Revels - Travelaugh No. 9: Cold Feats (1927)		Harry Lachman	France, United States

== Official Awards ==
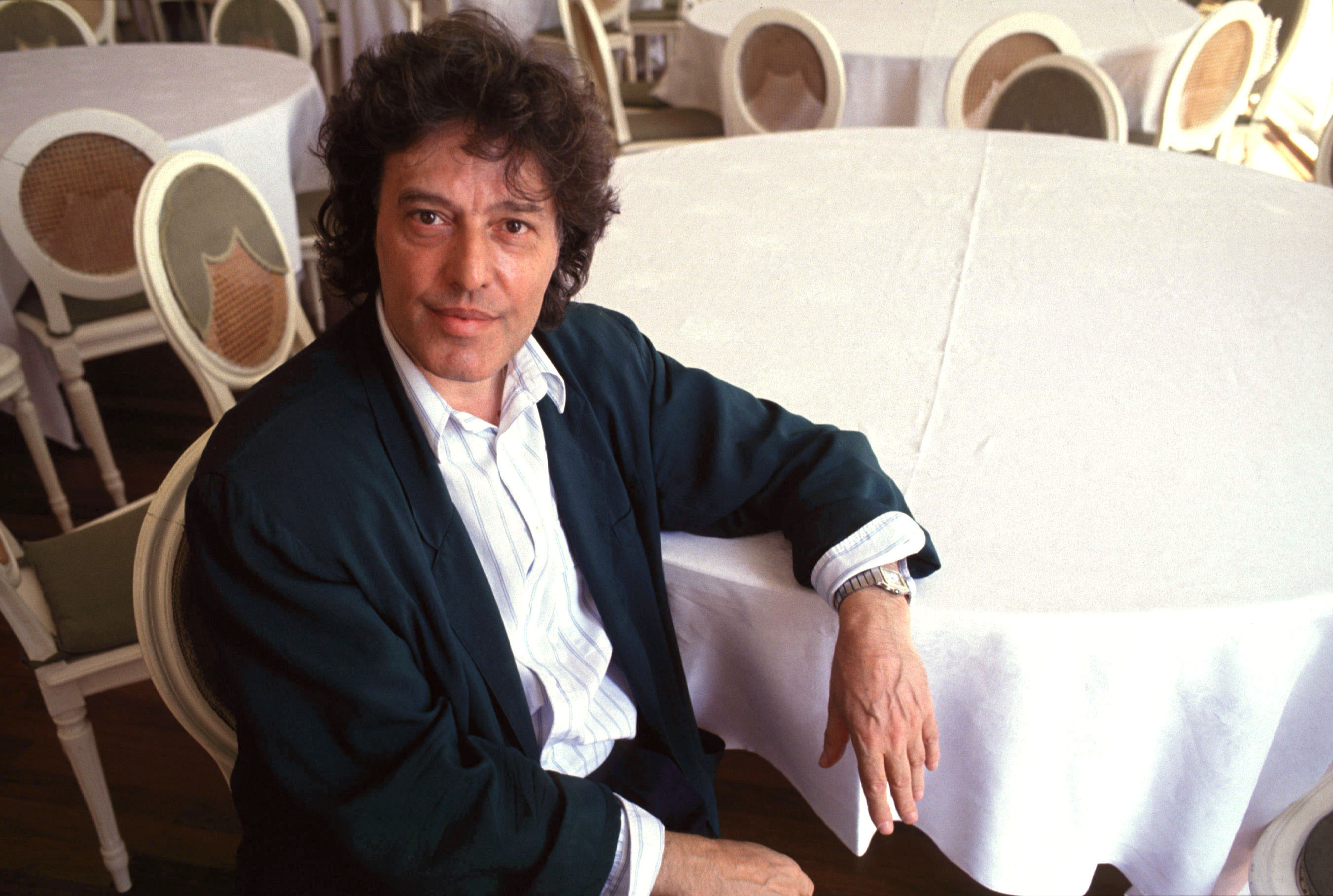
Tom Stoppard, winner of Golden Lion at 47th Venice International Film Festival

=== Main Competition ===
- Golden Lion: Rosencrantz & Guildenstern Are Dead by Tom Stoppard
- Grand Special Jury Prize: An Angel at My Table by Jane Campion
- Silver Lion:
  - Best Director: Martin Scorsese for Goodfellas
  - Best Screenplay: Helle Ryslinge for Sirup
- Silver Osella:
  - Best Cinematography: Marco Risi for Boys on the Outside
  - Best Editing: Dominique Auvray for No Fear, No Die
  - Best Original Music: Valeri Milovansky for The Only Witness
- Volpi Cup for Best Actor: Oleg Borisov for The Only Witness
- Volpi Cup for Best Actress: Gloria Münchmeyer for The Moon in the Mirror

== Independent Awards ==
=== The President of the Italian Senate's Gold Medal ===
- Raspad by Mikhail Belikov

=== Audience Award ===
- Martin Scorsese for Goodfellas

=== Golden Ciak ===
- Best Film: Mr. & Mrs. Bridge by James Ivory
- Best Actress: Marianne Sägebrecht for Martha and I

=== FIPRESCI Prize ===
- Mathilukal by Adoor Gopalakrishnan

=== Premio La Navicella Venezia Cinema ===
- The Only Witness by Michail Pandurski

=== OCIC Award ===
- An Angel at My Table by Jane Campion
  - Honorable Mention: I, the Worst of All (Yo, la peor de todas) by María Luisa Bemberg

=== UNICEF Award ===
- Mathilukal by Adoor Gopalakrishnan

=== Pasinetti Award ===
- Best Film: Mr. & Mrs. Bridge by James Ivory
- Best Actor: Richard Dreyfuss for Rosencrantz & Guildenstern Are Dead
- Best Actress: Stefania Sandrelli for The African Woman

=== Pietro Bianchi Award ===
- Ettore Scola

=== Little Golden Lion ===
- An Angel at My Table by Jane Campion

=== Elvira Notari Prize ===
- An Angel at My Table by Jane Campion

=== Bastone Bianco Award ===
- An Angel at My Table by Jane Campion
- Goodfellas by Martin Scorsese
  - Special Mention: Mo' Better Blues by Spike Lee

=== Kodak-Cinecritica Award ===
- The Station (La stazione) by Sergio Rubini

=== UCCA Venticittà Award ===
- Cold Light of Day by Fhiona-Louise
  - Special Mention: Under a Sky of Blue by Vitali Dudin
