= Downtown Precinct =

- Akhat Efes Efes
- Genre: Police procedural Action; Drama
- Created by: Amir Mann
- Written by: Amir Mann
- Starring: Amos Tamam; Efrat Dor; Maurice Cohen; Zohar Strauss; Vladimir Friedman; Eli Altonio; Golan Azoulay; Sharon Alexandre; Ricki Blich
- Country of origin: Israel
- Original languages: Hebrew; Russian; Arabic
- No. of seasons: 3
- No. of episodes: 36

Production
- Executive producers: Dafna Perner; Shai Ines
- Producer: Oriana Givoli Geniger
- Production location: Tel Aviv
- Cinematography: Ram Schviky
- Running time: 45 minutes
- Production company: Artza Productions

Original release
- Network: Channel 10
- Release: October 24, 2011 – present

Akhat Efes Efes (Hebrew: אחת אפס אפס, literally One Zero Zero, translated as Downtown Precinct) is an Israeli police procedural drama television series, revolving around an eccentric Detective named Arik Arbel and his team, which conducts criminal investigations in Tel Aviv.

== Cast and characters ==
=== Main cast ===
- Amos Tamam as Arik Arbel, Israeli police officer
- Efrat Dor as Alex Yudaev, new recruit in the police, Russian born, Anatoly's daughter.
- Maurice Cohen as Motti Ben-Ami, Aric's partner, known as "Motti The Maniac"
- Zohar Strauss as Asrian Babayof, Intelligent criminal mastermind, main antagonist
- Vladimir Friedman as Anatoly Alshinskiy, Asrian's assistant, Alex's father
- Eli Altonio as Dani Babayof, Asrian's brother
- Golan Azoulay as Ezra Elchanani, senior police officer
- Sharon Alexandre as Gideon Berkovich, Head of Police

=== Recurring cast ===
- Ricki Blich as Ronit Arbel, Aric's ex-wife
- Henri David as Ivri, Aric's first partner and his best friend, assassinated
- Dan Mor as Efi, Young detective, known as violent and specialized with explosives and heavy weapons
- Alon Pedut as Yonatan Bar-On, Investigator in Unit of International Crime Investigations
- Shalom Samuelov as Ze'ev Turjeman, mob
- Daniel Gad as Yuval Turjeman
- Herzl Tubi as Benny Turjeman
- Natasha Manor as Marina Yudaev, Alex's mother
- Meirav Shirom as Lital Ben David, police officer from Jerusalem District Police
- Avraham Mor as Avigdor Arbel, Aric's father
- Gil Frank as Shmuel Sheinberg
- Nati Kluger as Sharon Even, investigator from Internal Affairs Department
- Haim Znati as Mookie, Yasam officer
