= Rita Zohar =

Israeli actress (born 1944)

- ריטה זוהר
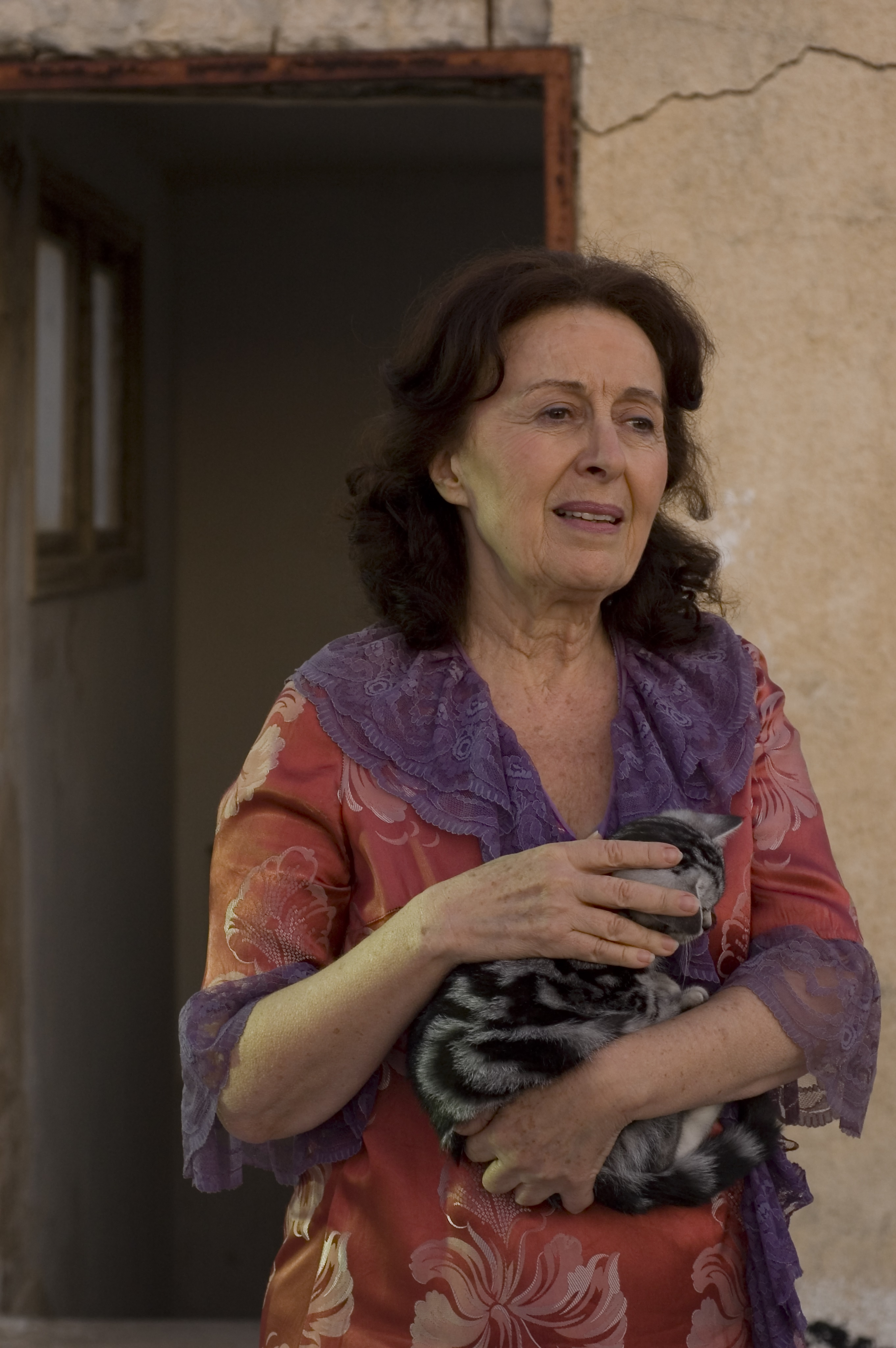
- Zohar in 2007
- Born: 16 January 1944 (age 82); Balta, Romanian-occupied Soviet Union
- Occupation: Actress
- Years active: 1961–present

Rita Zohar (Hebrew: ריטה זוהר; born 16 January 1944) is an Israeli actress who has appeared on film, television, and stage. She received Awards of the Israeli Film Academy for Best Actress for her role in the 1990 drama film Laura Adler's Last Love Affair and the Best Actress nomination for the 2009 drama film Mrs. Moskowitz and the Cats.

== Life and career ==
Zohar was born in Balta, Ukraine, in the Romanian-administered Transnistria Governorate, in a concentration camp during World War II. She was hidden as an infant and was 4 and 1/2 months old when the Russians liberated the camp. Zohar survived along with her mother and grandmother, and after the war they emigrated to Romania. In the 1950s, she emigrated to Israel with her mother. She began acting in the Cameri Theatre in Yiddish. In 1980s, Zohar moved to The United States and made guest-starring appearances on television series Quincy M.E., St. Elsewhere and Cagney & Lacey. She appeared in films Daniel (1983), Amadeus (1984), The Deliberate Stranger (1986), Lady in White (1988).

In 1990, Zohar returned to Israel for a starring role as stage actress Laura Adler in the drama film Laura Adler's Last Love Affair directed by Avraham Heffner. She received an Awards of the Israeli Film Academy for Best Actress for her performance. The following year she returned to the U.S. and began appearing in supporting roles in films such as Final Analysis (1992) and Waterworld (1995), and in the television series Thirtysomething, ER, Any Day Now and most notably a 1997 episode of 7th Heaven playing a Holocaust survivor.

In 2009, Zohar played another leading role in the Israeli drama film Mrs. Moskowitz and the Cats, receiving the Jerusalem Film Festival Award for Best Actress and the Ophir Award for Best Actress nomination.

In 2025, Zohar portrayed Holocaust survivor Bessie in Scarlett Johansson's film Eleanor the Great starring June Squibb as Bessie's best friend Eleanor. Zohar said, "This role in this movie has given me a voice. Even though this is not my story, this is not what happened to me or my family, but still, by being able to verbalize it, I connected to Bessie, and I became Bessie in the film." The film's screenwriter Tory Kamen said, "Another thing that was important to me was that we never really saw Eleanor telling Bessie's story. I wanted that to be from Bessie's mouth ... And Rita Zohar, who plays Bessie, is a Holocaust survivor herself, and does an unbelievable job."
