= I, the Worst of All =

1990 film

- Directed by: María Luisa Bemberg
- Screenplay by: María Luisa Bemberg; Antonio Larreta
- Based on: Sor Juana Inés de la Cruz o las trampas de la fe by Octavio Paz
- Produced by: Lita Stantic; Jose Luis García
- Starring: Assumpta Serna; Dominique Sanda; Héctor Alterio; Lautaro Murúa; Graciela Araujo; Gerardo Romano
- Cinematography: Félix Monti
- Edited by: Juan Carlos Macías
- Music by: Luis María Serra
- Production company: GEA Cinematográfica
- Distributed by: Crisalida Films
- Release date: 1990 (Venice)
- Running time: 105 minutes
- Country: Argentina
- Language: Spanish

I, the Worst of All (Spanish: Yo, la peor de todas) is a 1990 Argentine biographical drama film cowritten and directed by María Luisa Bemberg and starring Assumpta Serna, Dominique Sanda and Héctor Alterio. The film is a biopic on the life of the famous poet and nun Sor Juana Inés de la Cruz. It was based on Octavio Paz's book essay Sor Juana: Or, the Traps of Faith. The film premiered at the 47th Venice International Film Festival where it received the OCIC Award - Honorable Mention. The film was selected as the Argentine entry for the Best Foreign Language Film at the 63rd Academy Awards, but was not accepted as a nominee.

== Plot ==
In Mexico in the 17th century, the Viceroy of New Spain and the newly elected Archbishop discuss how they will rule. The Archbishop sends a letter to the convent where Sor Juana lives informing the abbess that his first official order of business will be to visit their convent and to meet Sor Juana. For the occasion Sor Juana presents a play she has been working on. The Viceroy and his wife, the Vicereine are impressed with Sor Juana's writing. The Archbishop on the other hand is disturbed that the convent is so lax. He secretly meets with a few nuns and persuades them to elect a more formal abbess. In the meantime Sor Juana and the Vicereine grow close. The Vicereine warns Sor Juana to be careful about how she speaks and what she reads and tells her of an auto-da-fé she witnessed in which hundreds were burned. Other nuns also approach Sor Juana and ask her to run for election to be the abbess, but Sor Juana refuses saying that she is in the middle of writing an epic poem which she cannot give up.

When the new abbess is elected she institutes a vow of poverty and tries to take away Sor Juana's books but the Vicereine insists that she keep them. The Archbishop then attempts to censor Sor Juana's books based on a poem she has written about the Vicereine which he claims is sinful. Sor Juana's books are taken away but when the Viceroy hears of this he demands they be returned to her. The Vicereine tells Sor Juana that as long as she and her husband are in Mexico she will be protected.

Sometime later the Viceroy learns that he has lost favour with the King of Spain and is to be replaced. Before he leaves he visits Sor Juana and asks that she give the Vicereine permission to take her works with her to be published in Spain. Sor Juana agrees. A political enemy of the Archbishop's encourages Sor Juana to write a rebuttal to one of the favourite theologians of the Archbishop. Sor Juana obliges believing the paper is for private circulation. However the work is published along with an attack on Sor Juana condemning her entire oeuvre.

In Spain the first volume of Sor Juana's poems have been published. The former Vicereine tasks a friend to bring a copy to Sor Juana who no longer answers letters and lives in seclusion and poverty in the abbey. When her former friend, a priest, agrees to hear her confession he orders her to do penance by relinquishing all her worldly possessions. As a final act of contrition Sor Juana writes a letter to the head of the church confessing that she lived her life as a pagan and signing it with her blood and the words, "I worst of all".

== Cast ==
- Assumpta Serna as Sor Juana Inés de la Cruz
- Dominique Sanda as La virreina
  - Cecilia Roth as La virreina's Spanish language voice
- Héctor Alterio as El virrey
- Lautaro Murúa as Archbishop
- Gerardo Romano as Siguenza
- Franklin Caicedo as Santa Cruz

== Reception ==
The film received positive reviews upon its release with many praising Bemberg's directing and Assumpta Serna's acting.

Frederic and Mary Ann Brussat, film reviewers for the website Spirituality and Practice, call the film "An illuminating and soulful portrait of America's first great poet, who happened to be a brilliant nun in seventeenth-century Mexico"; according to the Brussats, the film offers an interesting take on the interactions between women of faith and non-traditional beliefs and practices.

In The Austin Chronicle reviewer Marjorie Baumgarten gives I, the Worst of All three stars out five. In her review Baumgarten compares the movie to similar period movies. While she appreciates the depiction of a woman, especially a queer woman, defying conventional wisdom and expressing feminist ideas, she found the anti-religious themes to be too repetitive.

The film review staff of Time Out: London sing the film's praises, saying: "The drama is progressively unsettling, particularly as the spiritual malaise becomes manifest in the horrific ravages of the plague". The review staff found the movie compelling and attention capturing, presenting a fascinating glimpse into one of the greatest female poets of all time.

== See also ==
- List of submissions to the 63rd Academy Awards for Best Foreign Language Film
- List of Argentine submissions for the Academy Award for Best Foreign Language Film
