= Under a Sky of Blue =

1990 film

- Directed by: Vitali Dudin
- Written by: Viktor Merezhko
- Starring: Igor Furmanyuk
- Cinematography: Vladimir Kalashnikov
- Edited by: Olga Reshetnikova
- Music by: Vladimir Ryabov
- Release date: 1990
- Country: Soviet Union
- Language: Russian

Under a Sky of Blue (Russian: Под небом голубым…, romanized: Pod nebom golubym...) is a 1990 Soviet drama film written by Viktor Merezhko and directed by Vitali Dudin, in his feature film debut. It was entered into the Venice International Film Critics' Week competition at the 47th edition of the Venice Film Festival.

== Cast ==
- Igor Furmanyuk as Aleksey
- Anna Yanovskaya as Lena
- Nina Usatova as Kostyrina
- Juozas Budraitis as Sobolev
- Boris Lagoda as Georgi Volchek
- Elena Vnukova as Podruzhka

== Reception ==
A contemporary Variety review noted that "director Vitali Dudin, in his first feature, paints an unrelentingly grim picture of contemporary Soviet life" and "also brings off a number of outstanding moments and insights into his characters and their plight". La Stampa's film critic Alessandra Levantesi accused the film of mannerism, even if "high-level mannerism, whether in the experimental forms of the Leningrad school or in the naturalistic ones of the Moscow school; rarely lacking a personal touch, and with drama that never comes across as insincere".
