= Avshalom Peled =

- אבשלום פלד
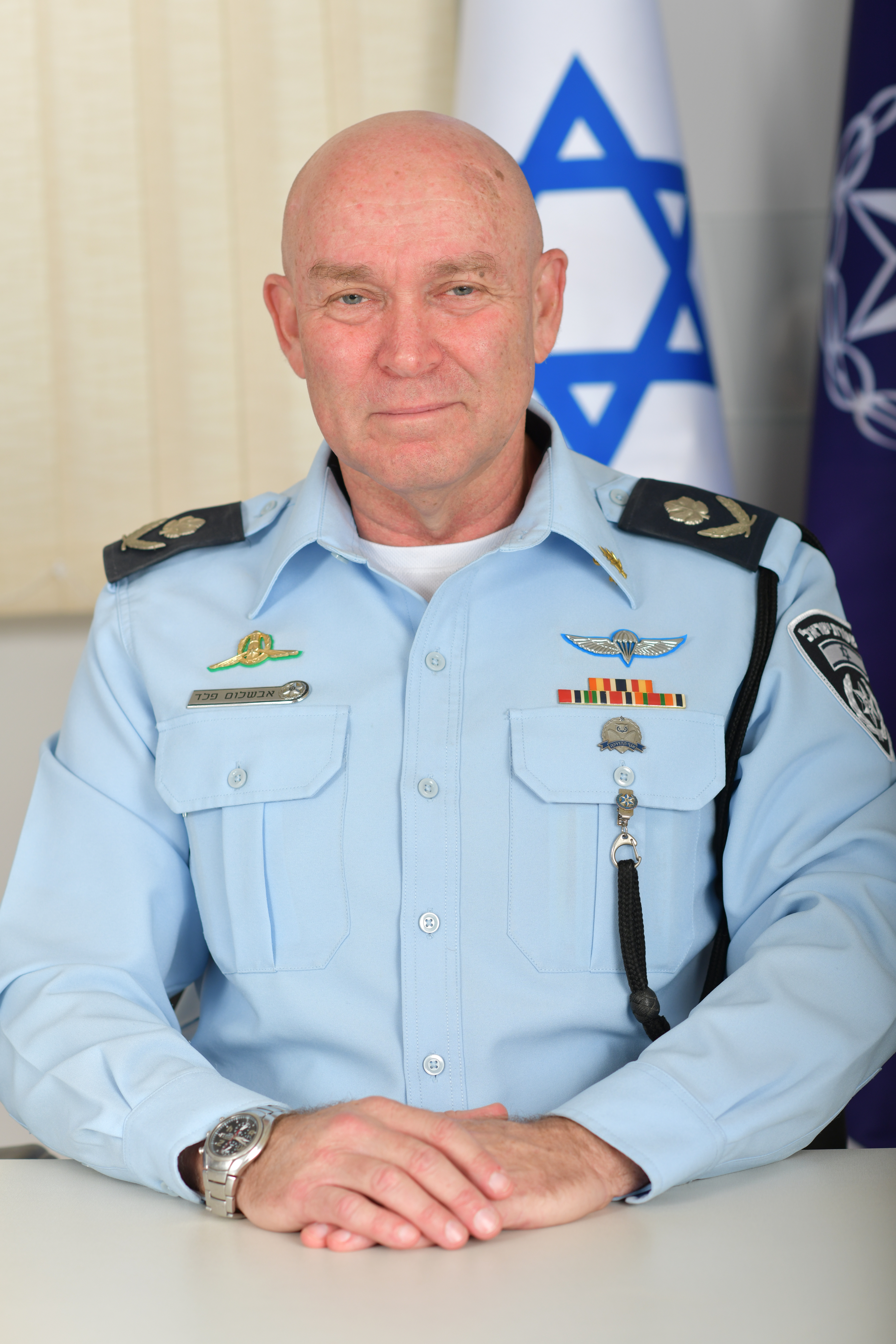

Jerusalem District Police
- Incumbent
- Assumed office 5th January 2026

Personal details
- Born: Avshalom Avshi Peled; 1961 (age 64–65)

Avshalom (Avshi) Peled (Hebrew: אבשלום אבשי פלד; born 1961) is an Israeli police officer who serves as the commander of the Jerusalem District Police since 2026.

== Biography ==
Peled was born in 1961. He served as an officer in Israel Defense Forces Armored Corps, where he commanded a company. After completing his military service, Peled worked as a security guard for the Shin Bet, Israel's internal security service.

=== Israel Police ===
In 1985 Peled enlisted to the Israel Border Police. He served as a combat operator and later as a platoon leader in Yamam, Israel's national counter-terrorism unit.

In 1988 following the Negev bus hijacking, he took part in a Yamam hostage-rescue operation. Later that year, he was moved to the Shin Bet, where he served as a security officer at Israeli missions in Istanbul and Paris.

In 1998 Peled became the commander of Beit Shemesh police station, in 2002 he was appointed as the head of the Operations Department in the Border Police, and in December 2004, He became the commander of the Israel Border Police in Gaza (Magav Gaza).

In 2011 Peled became the Deputy Commander of Israel Border Police. The following year, he became Deputy Commander of the Jerusalem District Police.

In 2026, Minister of National Security Itamar Ben-Gvir appointed Avshalom Peled as commander of the Jerusalem District Police.

=== Controversy ===
In 2015, Peled was investigated on suspicion of bribery, breach of trust, and abuse of office. In 2023, Peled was investigated on suspicion of breach of trust and abuse of authority. Attorney General of Israel claimed that Peled had used his position to promote his personal interests.

== Personal life ==
Avshalom Peled is married with three children. he lives at Zekharia, Israel.

Peled holds a bachelor's degree in History of the Middle East and in Islamic studies from Ben-Gurion University of the Negev (BGU), and a master's degree in Jewish studies from Ono Academic College.
