= Luis María Serra =

Argentine musician and composer (1941/1942–2024)

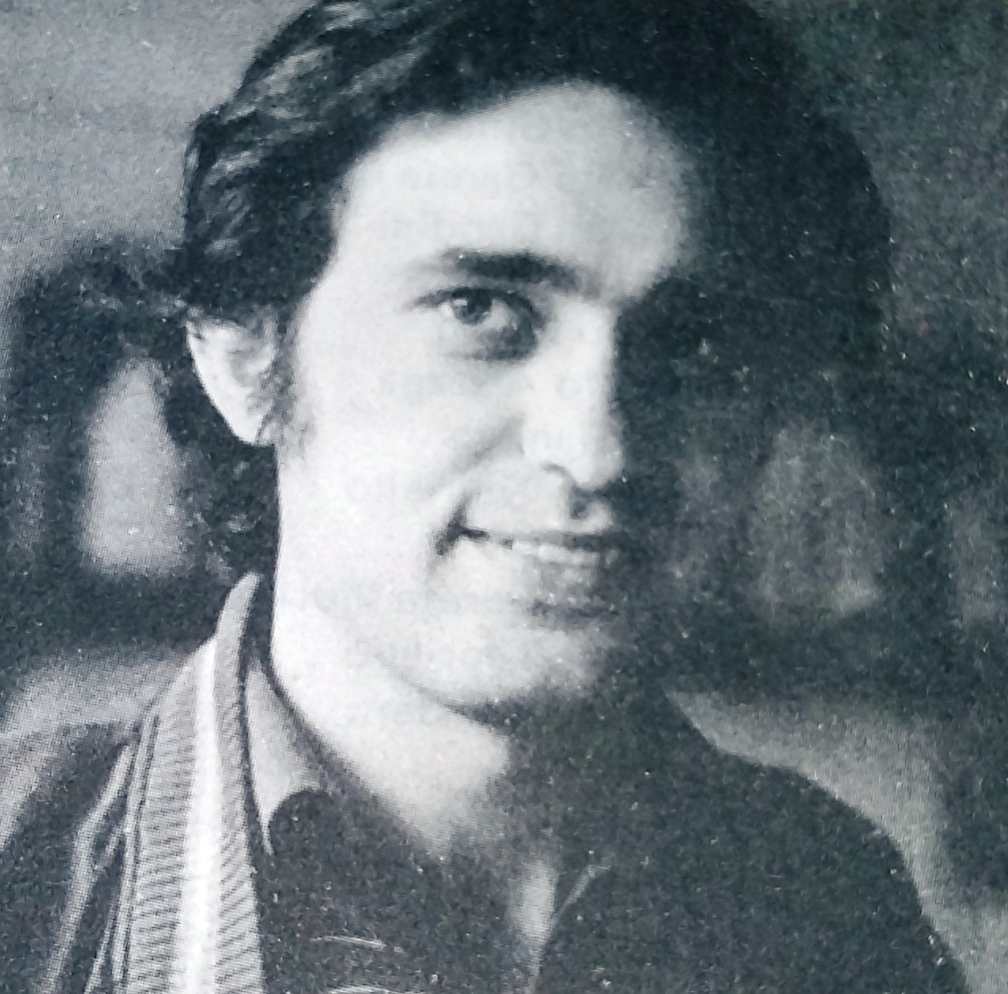
- Serra in 1972
- Born: 24 August 1941; Buenos Aires or Lanús, Argentina
- Died: 13 May 2024 (aged 82)
- Education: Pontifical Catholic University of Argentina; Conservatoire de Paris
- Occupation(s): Musician; Composer

Luis María Serra (24 August 1941 – 13 May 2024) was an Argentine musician and composer.

== Biography ==
Born on 24 August 1941 in Buenos Aires or 1942 in Lanús, Serra studied at the Pontifical Catholic University of Argentina under the likes of Alberto Ginastera and Gerardo Gandini. He composed original music for the films La Mary, Camila, and I, the Worst of All.

Luis María Serra died on 13 May 2024.
