= Avraham Mor =

Israeli actor (1935–2012)

- אברהם מור
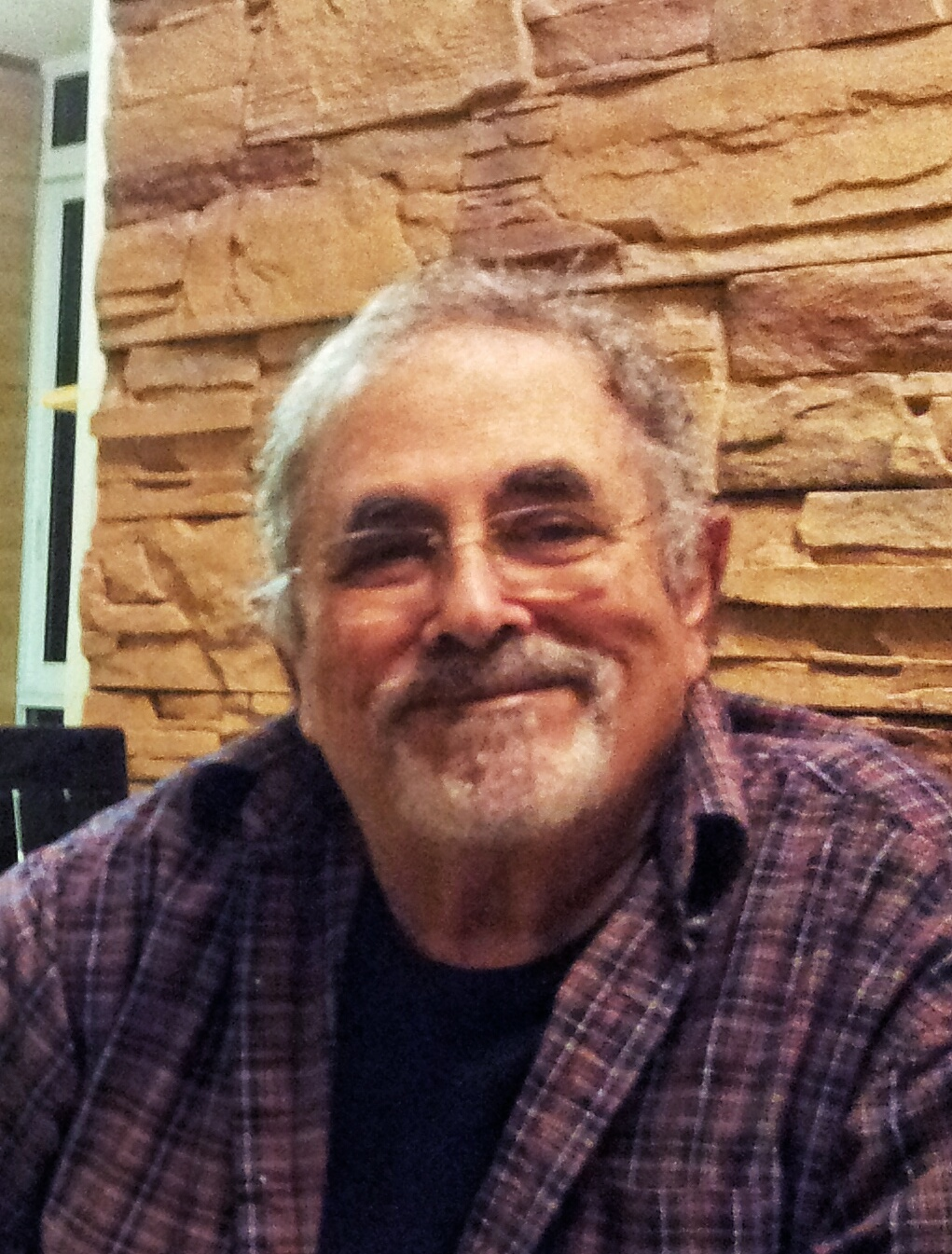
- Mor in 2012
- Born: Avraham Markowitz; 5 May 1935; Tel Aviv, Mandatory Palestine
- Died: 16 December 2012 (aged 77); Kfar Saba, Israel
- Occupations: Actor; voice actor
- Years active: 1953–2012
- Spouse: Dalia Mor (m. 1978)
- Children: 2

Avraham Mor (Hebrew: אברהם מור; 5 May 1935 – 16 December 2012) was an Israeli actor and voice actor.

== Biography ==
Born in Tel Aviv, Mor started out in his teenage years performing in a show for the Hashomer Hatzair alongside fellow actors Uri Zohar and Illi Gorlitzky. He then began studying acting within the drama studio of the Cameri Theatre for the next two years. Mor also found stage acting opportunities in the Habima Theatre and starred in many plays which includes Kazablan as well as taking part in the comedy troupe known as Batzal Yarok.

On screen, Mor found professional opportunities on cinema and television. His earliest film appearance took place in 1966 and he starred in 10 other films throughout the next 30 years, most notably Alex Holeh Ahavah, Fortuna and Laura Adler's Last Love Affair. On television, Mor appeared on Rechov Sumsum, Parpar Nechmad and more. On the television show Downtown Precinct, he had a recurring role as the central character's father.

Mor was known internationally as a voice dubber. He performed major Hebrew dubbing roles for Disney which includes Happy in Snow White and the Seven Dwarfs, Archimedes Q. Porter in Tarzan, Maurice in Beauty and the Beast, Al in Toy Story 2, Horace in One Hundred and One Dalmatians and The Sultan in Aladdin. Other roles included Reverend Clement Hedges in Wallace & Gromit: The Curse of the Were-Rabbit as well as Grandpa Simpson in The Simpsons Movie.

=== Personal life ===
From 1978 until his death in 2012, Mor was married to sociologist Dalia Mor who was 18 years his junior. They had two sons.

== Death ==
On 16 December 2012, Mor died in Meir Hospital from cancer at the age of 77. He was survived by his wife and two sons and was buried at the Menucha Nechona Cemetery.
