= Eleanor the Great =

2025 American film directed by Scarlett Johansson

- Theatrical release poster
- Directed by: Scarlett Johansson
- Written by: Tory Kamen
- Produced by: Scarlett Johansson; Justin Baldoni; Jonathan Lia; Keenan Flynn; Trudie Styler; Celine Rattray; Jessamine Burgum; Kara Durrett
- Starring: June Squibb; Erin Kellyman; Jessica Hecht; Chiwetel Ejiofor; Rita Zohar
- Cinematography: Hélène Louvart
- Edited by: Harry Jierjian
- Music by: Dustin O'Halloran
- Production companies: Pinky Promise; Maven Screen Media; These Pictures; Wayfarer Studios
- Distributed by: Sony Pictures Classics; TriStar Pictures
- Release dates: May 20, 2025 (Cannes); September 26, 2025 (United States)
- Running time: 98 minutes
- Country: United States
- Language: English
- Box office: $4.8 million

Eleanor the Great is a 2025 American comedy-drama film directed by Scarlett Johansson, in her feature film directorial debut, and written by Tory Kamen. The film stars June Squibb supported by Erin Kellyman, Jessica Hecht, Rita Zohar, and Chiwetel Ejiofor. Its plot follows Eleanor Morgenstein, a 94-year-old woman, who strikes up an unlikely friendship with a 19-year-old student in New York City. It covers such themes as aging, Jewish identity, grief, and friendship.

Eleanor the Great had its world premiere at the Un Certain Regard section of the Cannes Film Festival on May 20, 2025, and was released in the United States on September 26, 2025 by Sony Pictures Classics and TriStar Pictures.

== Plot ==
After the death of Bessie, her best friend and roommate of twelve years, 94-year-old Eleanor Morgenstein leaves Florida and moves to New York City to live with her daughter Lisa and grandson Max. Feeling sidelined by her busy family, Eleanor finds herself at a loss when Lisa drops her off at the local Jewish Community Center.

Through a misunderstanding, Eleanor wanders into a support group for Holocaust survivors. Rather than correct the mistake, she begins sharing Bessie's harrowing story of surviving the Holocaust as if it were her own — a way to honor her friend's memory while filling the void of loneliness and finding a sense of belonging. Her fabricated history captures the attention of Nina Davis, a grieving journalism student who has recently lost her mother. The two form an unlikely and genuine friendship, with Nina eventually incorporating Eleanor's "survivor testimony" into a class project. Nina's father Roger, a local television newscaster who is himself struggling to process his wife's death and connect with his daughter, decides to broadcast Eleanor's story and though distressed, Eleanor agrees to it.

The subsequent unraveling — exposed by Lisa when she discovers the deception during the filming — leaves a trail of damage: public humiliation for Eleanor's family, a sense of betrayal among the survivors who welcomed her, and a rupture in her bond with Nina. Eleanor subsequently agrees to move to a care home, which she had previously been staunchly against.

Roger's decision to air the story and bring further attention to Eleanor's deception initially upsets Nina, who confronts him for his failure to help her during her grieving and thinking only of himself. However, Roger focuses the story on Eleanor's grief over losing Bessie and the topic of grief as a whole (including his own struggles), and the broadcast is seen by Nina, Lisa and Eleanor. This ultimately leads to Eleanor reconciling with both Nina and Lisa, and Roger reconciling with Nina.

Eleanor finds herself making new friends and actually enjoying her time at the care home. Nina and Lisa visit Eleanor, and on their way to lunch, Eleanor goes back to the support group to apologize and to share Bessie's story truthfully.

The film ends with a flashback of Eleanor and Bessie, with Bessie tearfully discussing her experience during the Holocaust and saying that though she struggled for a long time with survivor's guilt and wondered why she lived when her younger brother did not, she has started to understand it was so she could find and share her life with Eleanor.

== Cast ==
- June Squibb as Eleanor Morgenstein, a 94-year-old woman who has recently moved back to New York City
- Erin Kellyman as Nina Davis, a college journalist who has recently lost her mother, whom Eleanor befriends
- Jessica Hecht as Lisa, Eleanor's daughter
- Chiwetel Ejiofor as Roger Davis, Nina's father, a recent widower and a news anchor
- Rita Zohar as Bessie Stern, Eleanor's best friend, a Holocaust survivor, recently deceased
- Will Price as Max, Eleanor's grandson
- Greg Kaston as Peter

== Production ==
Scarlett Johansson expressed an early desire to direct, inspired at age 12 while observing Robert Redford during the filming of The Horse Whisperer (1998). In September 2023, it was announced that Johansson would make her feature directorial debut with Eleanor, Invisible, a character-driven script by Tory Kamen about an elderly woman navigating loss and transition in New York City.

The project was introduced to Johansson by Celine Rattray of Maven Screen Media. Moved by the script, Johansson decided to direct and produce the film. These Pictures co-founders Jonathan Lia and Keenan Flynn supported her involvement. Kamen, who had struggled for eight years to produce the screenplay, credited Johansson's industry influence for facilitating its realization.

In February 2024, June Squibb, Chiwetel Ejiofor, Jessica Hecht, and Erin Kellyman joined the cast in undisclosed roles, with TriStar Pictures and Sony Pictures Classics partnering to distribute for the first time. Squibb, 94 at the time, was then announced to be cast in the titular role, a decision Johansson deemed essential. The project received backing from Pinky Promise, a female-led production company, and Johansson was granted full creative autonomy. Hélène Louvart was chosen as director of photography, and principal photography got underway in February 2024. Filming locations included Coney Island, New York City, which presented logistical challenges due to Squibb's age and the urban environment. Filming wrapped in April. Johansson also worked closely with the USC Shoah Foundation to ensure the authenticity of a subplot involving Holocaust survivors. Real survivors were cast for scenes depicting a support group.

== Release ==
In April 2025, Eleanor the Great was revealed to be part of the Un Certain Regard lineup at the Cannes Film Festival, where it had its world premiere on May 20, 2025. The film was shown at the Toronto International Film Festival 2025. It was released on September 26, 2025.

== Reception ==
=== Critical reception ===
On the review aggregator website Rotten Tomatoes, 67% of 151 critics' reviews are positive, with an average rating of 6.2/10. The website's consensus reads: "Scarlett Johansson's directorial debut may have the pitfalls of an unsteady visionary, but this ultimately uneven caper is greatly amplified by June Squibb's exquisite performance." Metacritic, which uses a weighted average, assigned the film a score of 52 out of 100, based on 28 critics, indicating "mixed or average" reviews.

=== Accolades ===
| Award / Festival | Date of ceremony | Category | Recipient(s) | Result | Ref. |
|---|---|---|---|---|---|
| Cannes Film Festival | May 24, 2025 | Un Certain Regard Award | Scarlett Johansson | Nominated | |
| Cannes Film Festival | May 24, 2025 | Camera d'Or | Scarlett Johansson | Nominated | |
| Deauville American Film Festival | September 13, 2025 | Deauville Audience Award | Eleanor the Great | Won | |
| Miskolc International Film Festival | September 13, 2025 | Emeric Pressburger Prize | Eleanor the Great | Nominated | |
| The Astra Awards | January 9, 2026 | Best First Feature | Eleanor the Great | Nominated | |
| AARP Movies for Grownups Awards | January 10, 2026 | Best Actress | June Squibb | Nominated | |
| AARP Movies for Grownups Awards | January 10, 2026 | Best Intergenerational Film | Eleanor the Great | Nominated | |
| Cinema for Peace Awards | 16 February 2026 | Cinema for Peace Dove for The Most Valuable Film of the Year | Eleanor the Great | Nominated | |
