= Sirup (film) =

- Directed by: Helle Ryslinge
- Cinematography: Dirk Brüel
- Music by: Peer Raben
- Release date: 1990
- Country: Denmark

Sirup is a 1990 Danish drama film written and directed by Helle Ryslinge. It was entered into the main competition at the 47th Venice International Film Festival.

== Plot ==
Lasse Jager, a salesman at a Danish convenience store, decides to move to the fictional village of Raker, Minnesota, home to a large Danish diaspora. Lasse meets and marries an American woman, and returns with her to Denmark. However, unbeknownst to him, they are filming a sitcom called "Sirup" in the convenience store he works at, which parodies the store's workers - including him. Lasse must decide if he wants to star in the sitcom as an actor, or take it to the police, while also having to deal with a man who is a regular at the store, but later finds out that he is a rapist who escaped from prison.

== Cast ==
- Peter Hesse Overgaard as Lasse
- Kirsten Lehfeldt as Ditte
- Steen Svare as Jesper
- Henrik Scheele as Terje
- Pernille Højmark as Pia
- Aage Haugland as Goldbauer
- Søren Østergaard as Hr. Finth
