= Holy Lands =

- Theatrical release poster
- Directed by: Amanda Sthers
- Screenplay by: Amanda Sthers
- Based on: Les Terres saintes by Amanda Sthers
- Produced by: Laurent Bacri; Didier Lupfer; Alain Pancrazi
- Starring: James Caan; Tom Hollander; Jonathan Rhys Meyers; Rosanna Arquette; Efrat Dor; Patrick Bruel
- Cinematography: Regis Blondeau
- Edited by: Nadia Ben Rachid
- Music by: Grégoire Hetzel
- Distributed by: StudioCanal
- Release date: June 17, 2017 (United Kingdom)
- Running time: 100 minutes
- Countries: France; Belgium
- Language: English

Holy Lands is a 2017 comedy-drama film written and directed by Amanda Sthers and starring James Caan, Tom Hollander, Jonathan Rhys Meyers, Rosanna Arquette, Efrat Dor and Patrick Bruel. It is based on Sthers' novel Les Terres saintes.

== Plot ==
Facing a crossroads in life, American Jewish retired cardiologist Harry Rosenmerck leaves New York and his family with an unlikely plan to start a pig farm in Nazareth, causing the anger of local communities. His conflict with the town Rabbi, Moshe Cattan slowly turns into a friendship that leads him to reevaluate his relationship with his estranged family, including his difficult ex-wife, his 34-year-old student daughter, and his playwright son David. Through an emotional journey, this dysfunctional group will try to make their way back to each other, renewing ties when they all need it the most.

== Cast ==
- James Caan as Harry
- Tom Hollander as Moshe
- Jonathan Rhys Meyers as David
- Rosanna Arquette as Monica
- Efrat Dor as Annabelle
- Patrick Bruel as Michel

== Production ==
The film was shot in Israel and Belgium.

== Reception ==
The film has a 30% rating on Rotten Tomatoes. Christy Lemire of RogerEbert.com awarded the film one and a half stars. Trevor Johnston of Radio Times awarded the film two stars out of five.

== Accolades ==
The film won awards for Best Adapted Screenplay and Best Cinematography at the Downtown Film Festival in Los Angeles in 2018.
