= Efrat Dor =

Israeli actress (born 1983)

- אפרת דור
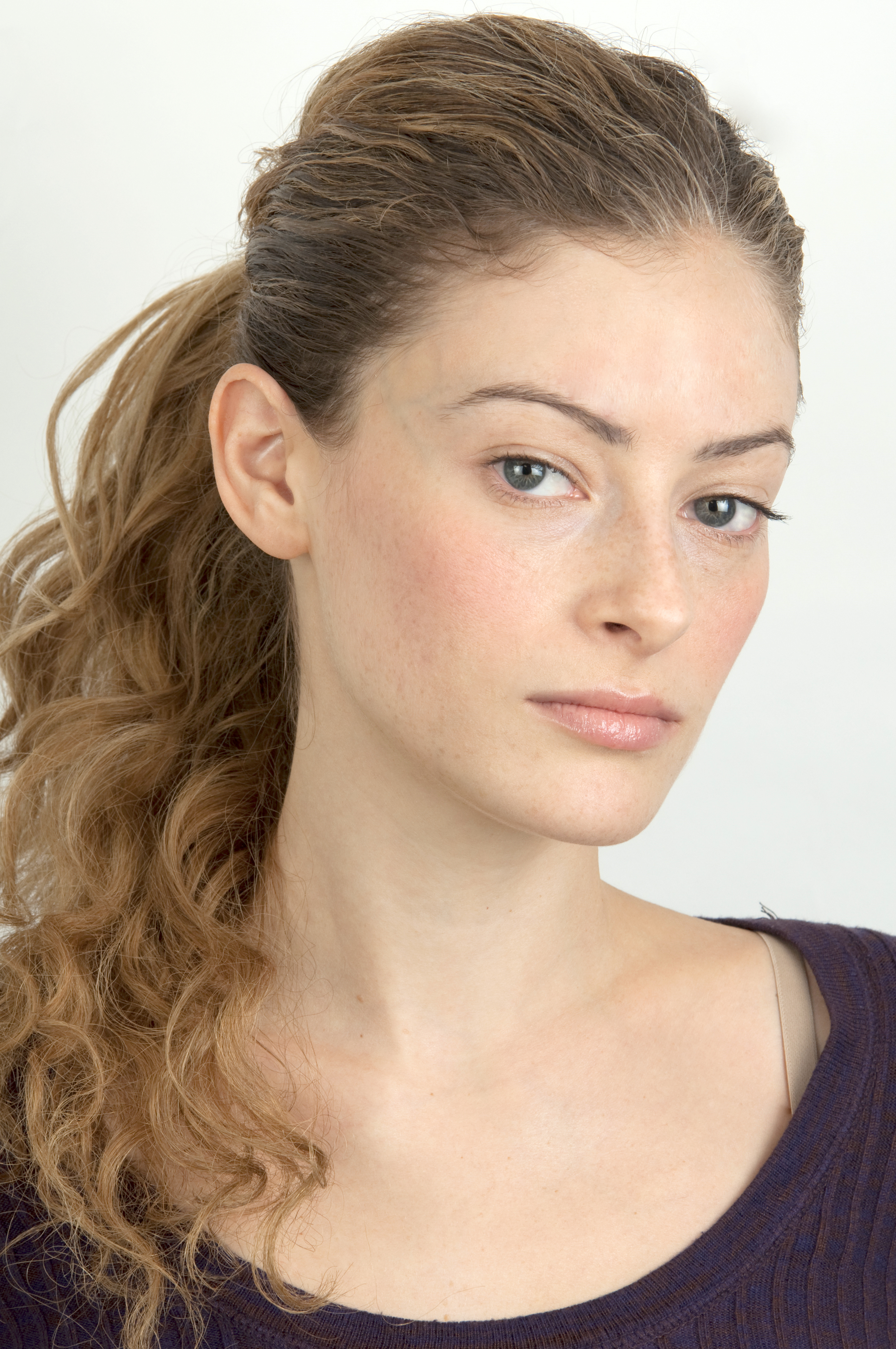
- Dor in 2012
- Born: 6 January 1983 (age 43); Be'er Sheva, Israel
- Education: Beit Zvi
- Occupation: Actress
- Years active: 2006–present

Efrat Dor (Hebrew: אפרת דור; born 6 January 1983) is an Israeli actress. She is best known for portraying Magdalena Gross in the film The Zookeeper’s Wife, as Lizzie DeLaurentis in the Amazon show Sneaky Pete, and as Eva McCulloch in The Flash.

== Early life ==
Dor was born in Be'er Sheva, Israel, to a family of Ashkenazi Polish-Jewish descent. She grew up in its neighboring affluent town of Omer with her parents, a writer and an engineer, and three siblings. Her Polish-Jewish grandmother's mother, father, and his brother were all murdered by the Nazis during the Holocaust.

Dor attended Eshel Ha'Nasi high school where she studied drama. She also trained as a ballet dancer at the Bat-Dor Beer-Sheva professional dance school in Beersheba. She went on to study acting at the Beit Zvi School for the Performing Arts in Israel and Lee Strasberg Theatre and Film Institute in New York.

== Career ==
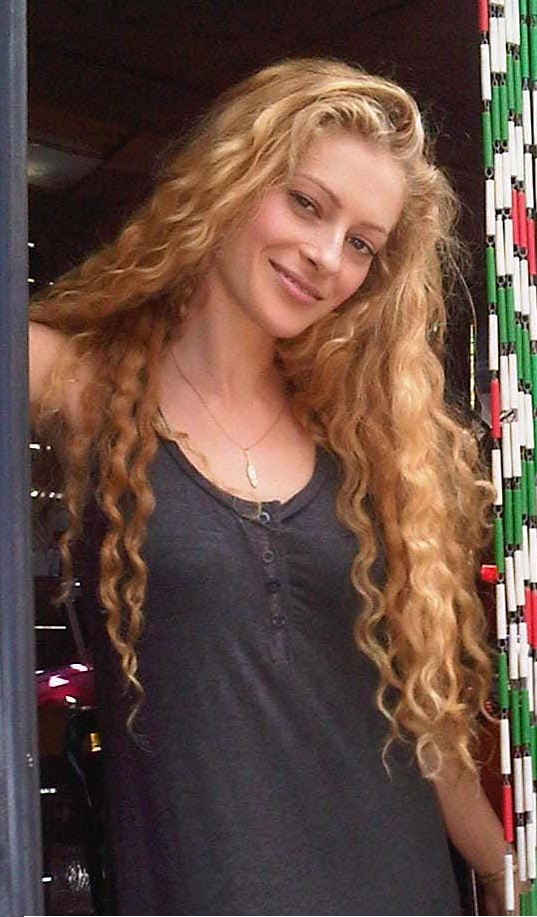
Dor in 2011

Dor began her professional acting career in 2007 with small roles in Israeli television. She made her feature film debut in 2009 in the Israeli film Phobidilia which featured in the Berlin International Film Festival that same year. She first gained recognition in Israel in 2010 for her role as Shir Ambar in the TV drama Asfur. In 2012, she was nominated for Best Actress in a Drama Series at the Awards of the Israeli Television Academy for the role of police recruit Alex Yudayov in Achat Efes Efes. In 2017, she attracted attention for her depiction of the Polish sculptor Magdalena Gross in the Niki Caro film The Zookeeper’s Wife alongside Jessica Chastain. In 2018, Dor starred in the English-language French film Holy Lands. In 2019, she won acclaim for her portrayal of con artist Lizzie DeLaurentis in the third season of Amazon's hit show Sneaky Pete. Later that year, she was cast in the regular role of Eva McCulloch in the latter half of season six of The Flash.

== Filmography ==
=== Film ===
Year	Title	Role	Notes
2009	Phobidilia	Jessica	Israeli film
2017	The Zookeeper’s Wife	Magda Gross	
2017	And Then She Arrived	Tamar	Israeli film
2018	Holy Lands	Annabelle	
2019	Mossad	Linda Harris	Israeli film
2025	Yes!	Yasmin	

=== Television ===
Year	Title	Role	Notes
2009–2010	Meorav Yerushalmi	Hila	Israeli series.
2010–2011	Asfur	Shir Ambar	Israeli series. Series regular
2011	Pillars of Smoke (Timrot Ashan)	Liron	Israeli series
2011–2015	Achat Efes Efes / Downtown Precinct	Alex Yudayov	Israeli series. Series regular
2014–2015	Mermaids	Elinor	Israeli series
2016	Ha-Hamama	Irene	Israeli series
2017–2018	Greenhouse Academy	Michelle Wallace	
2019	Sneaky Pete	Lizzie DeLaurentis	Recurring (season 3); 10 episodes
2019–2022	Mayans M.C.	Anna Linares	Recurring (seasons 2–3); Guest (season 4); 9 episodes
2020–2021	The Flash	Eva McCulloch / Mirror Monarch	Series regular (season 6–7); 11 episodes
