= Hazael J. Williams =

American politician

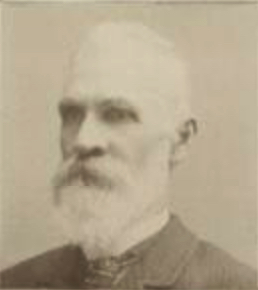

Member of the Virginia House of Delegates for Augusta County and Staunton
- In office December 2, 1891 – December 6, 1893 Serving with George W. Koiner
- Preceded by: Alexander B. Lightner
- Succeeded by: Thomas R. N. Speck

Personal details
- Born: Hazael Joseph Williams; April 28, 1830 Williamsville, Virginia, U.S.
- Died: July 18, 1911 (aged 81) Greenville, Virginia, U.S.
- Party: Democratic
- Spouse(s): Mary Ann Miller; Rebecca Jane McCormick

Military service
- Allegiance: Confederate States
- Branch/service: Confederate States Army
- Years of service: 1861–1865
- Rank: Lieutenant colonel
- Unit: 5th Virginia Infantry
- Battles/wars: American Civil War

Hazael Joseph Williams (April 28, 1830 – July 18, 1911) was an American politician who served in the Virginia House of Delegates.
