= Ted Absolom =

Australian rules footballer

Personal information
- Full name: Edward Absolom
- Born: 30 August 1875; Mortlake, Victoria
- Died: 18 January 1927 (aged 51); Coleraine, Victoria
- Original team: Mortlake

Playing career^{1}
Years	Club	Games (Goals)
1900	Collingwood	11 (3)
- ^{1} Playing statistics correct to the end of 1900.

Edward Absolom (30 August 1875 – 18 January 1927) was an Australian rules footballer, soldier and farmer who played with Collingwood in the Victorian Football League (VFL) and served in the 2nd Boer War.

Born in Mortlake, Victoria Edward 'Ted' Absolom (also 'Absalom') was one of 16 children born William and Mary Ann Absolom in Mortlake, Victoria.

After playing 11 games with the Collingwood Football Club in 1900, Absolom enlisted in the 1st Battalion, Kitchener's Fighting Scouts on 18 December 1900 in Salisbury, Rhodesia, where he was assigned the regimental number '2' and served 149 days until being medically discharge on 15 May 1901 in Bulawayo, Rhodesia.

On return to Australia, Absolom enlisted with the 2nd Australian Commonwealth Horse on 8 January 1902 and returned to Australia in August 1902. To date, Ted Absolom is not commemorated on any war memorials in his home town of Mortlake, Victoria.

Ted Absolom died in Coleraine, Victoria on 18 January 1927 and was survived by his wife Emily Ester Absolom.

== Sources ==
- Holmesby, Russell & Main, Jim (2007). The Encyclopedia of AFL Footballers. 7th ed. Melbourne: Bas Publishing.
