= Absalon (artist) =

Israeli-French sculptor (1964–1993)

- אבשלום
- Born: Meir Eshel; 26 December 1964; Ashdod, Israel
- Died: 10 October 1993 (aged 28); Paris, France
- Occupation: Sculptor

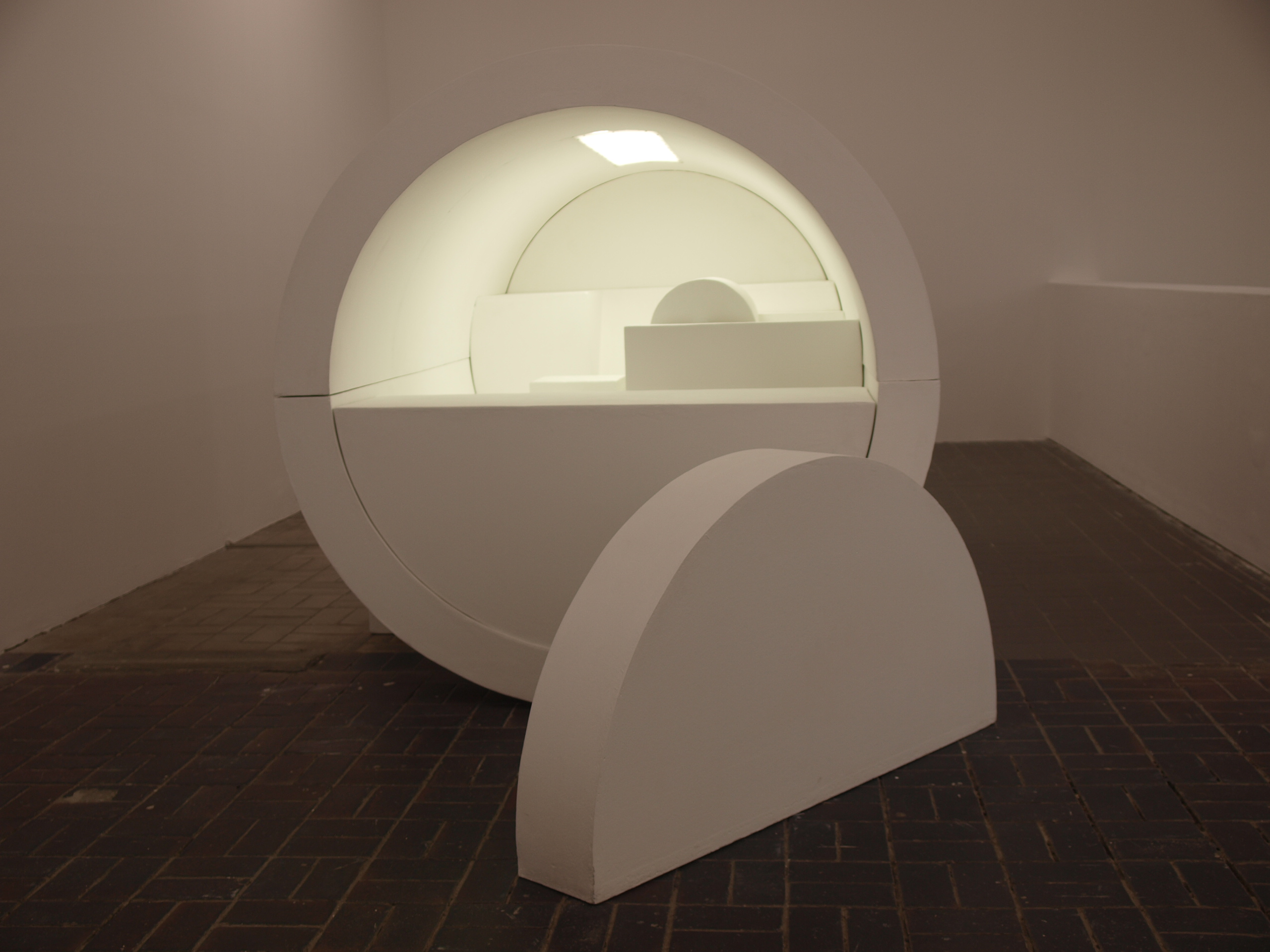
Absalon.Cell.No.2.1991

Meir Eshel (Hebrew: מאיר אשל; 26 December 1964 – 10 October 1993), known professionally as Absalon, was an Israeli-French sculptor.

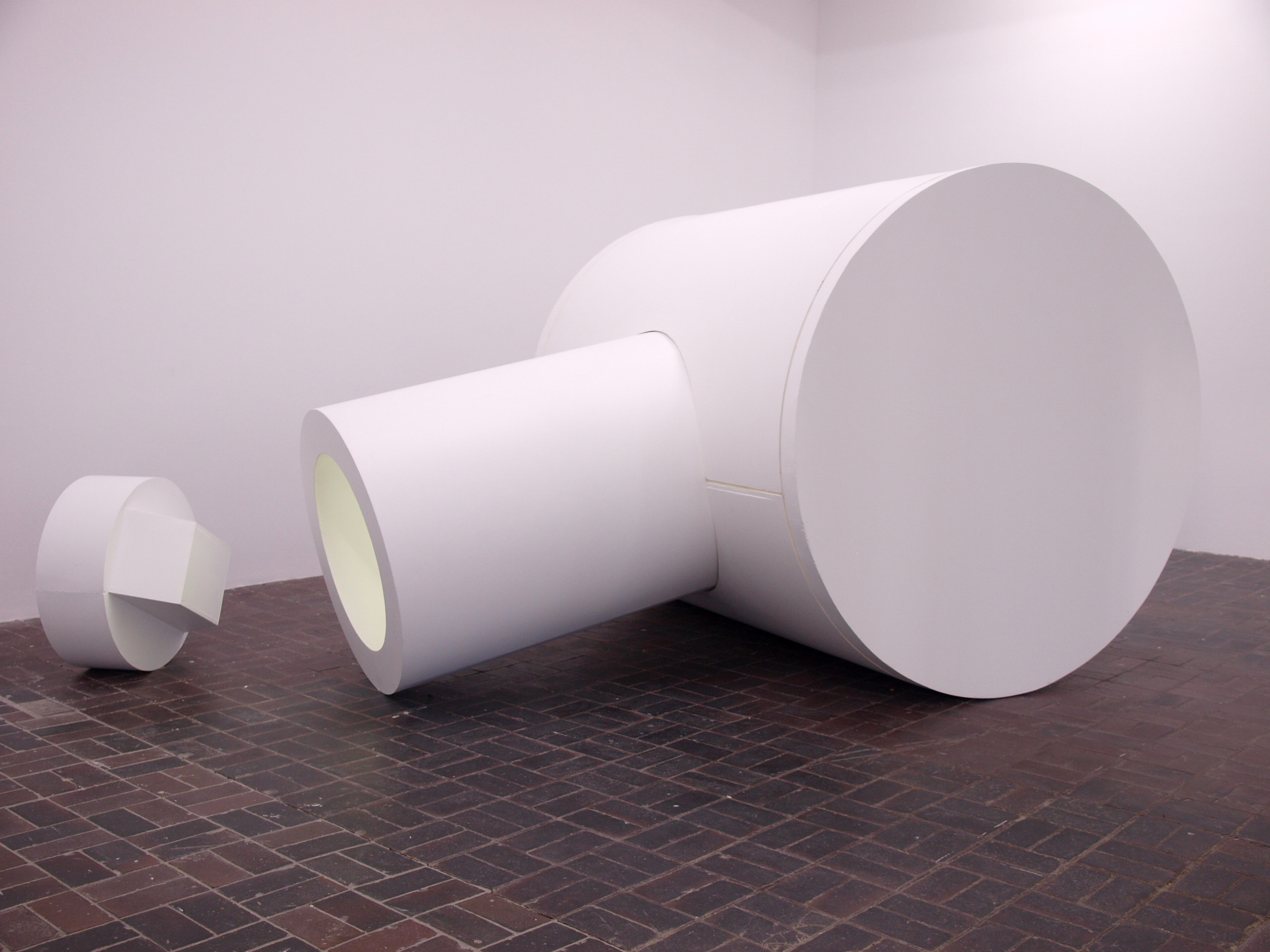
Absalon.Cell.No.5

== Biography ==
Meir Eshel, the eldest of four children of Adèle and Elie Eshel, was born in December 1964 in the city of Ashdod. At the age fourteen he began to study at the Technical School of the Air Force in Haifa. After his graduation in 1982 he served as an aircraft technician at the Hatzerim Israeli Air Force Base for three years.

From 1985 to 1987, Absalon lived in Sinai and later in the dunes south of Ashdod, where he built a wooden cabin and made his living making jewelry. In an interview Absalon described the period:"I built my first house when I was 20: I was discharged from the army in a very bad state and went to the desert [...] for about a year I lived with the Bedouins in Sinai. I had a fantasy about life in the desert. I believed I could do it, until I realized it didn't fulfill me."

In 1987 he immigrated to Paris, and moved to the home of his uncle Jacques Ohayon which was located on Rue du Temple in the Third Arrondissement of Paris. Eshel through Ohayon met several artists such as Christian Boltanski and Annette Messager. He began studying art at the École Nationale Supérieure d'Arts Paris-Cergy (ENSAPC) and attended the weekly Boltanski class at the École nationale supérieure des Beaux-Arts (ENSBA) during this period, he adopted the name "Absalon", a nickname given to him by one of his uncle's friends and referred to the biblical Absalon. In 1989 he received a one-year scholarship to study at the Institut des Hautes Études en Arts Plastiques in Paris. In 1990 he was represented by the Galerie Chantal Crousel. In the same year he was introduced to the curator Yona Fischer by Christian Boltanski, who invited him to exhibit in Israel at the Artists Studios, Aika Brown Gallery, Jerusalem, it was the first time he returned to Israel since moving to Paris. In 1991 Absalon moved to live in the Villa Lipchitz (Jacques Lipchitz) in Boulogne built by Le Corbusier in 1923–24. In 1993 Absalon planned to live in the six cells he designed for six cities, on October 10, 1993, Absalon died from an illness associated with HIV, at the age of 28.

The film "The seven years of Absalon" premiere, Created by & Script: David Ofek, Amit Azaz took place on May 29 at the Tel-Aviv Cinematheque. "The film describes Meir Eshel, a 22-year-old beach boy from Southern Israel, buys a one-way ticket to Paris and re-invents himself as an artist calling himself Absalon. He quickly rises to art-scene stardom, showcased by the most prestigious museums worldwide: the Venice Biennale, Centre Pompidou Paris, Tate Gallery London, and Israel Museum. Absalon's success was short-lived – almost seven years passed since his arrival in Paris until his tragic death, during the peak of his success at the age of 28. More than 25 years later, his younger brother Dani Eshel's first assignment as estate manager – is to sell Absalon's final art piece. Through his journey, we learn about the life of a unique Israeli artist." The film won the "Jury Award" at the Docaviv International Documentary Film Festival 2022.

In May 2022, an official website containing the entire archive of Absalon art was launched by Absalon family.

== Cells ==
In the course of six years Absalon created a series of one person living units based on everyday routine actions and designed entirely in relation to his measures. The inside of the cell is all covered in white in order to reduce distractions or elements that can disturb the eye. In his video Solutions (1992) Absalon demonstrate the study of measurements and calculation of movements like eating, sleeping, taking shower which later will define the form of his cells. In 1993 Absalon started to construct six cells which were supposed to be installed in six metropolitan centers as Absalon described in interview: "I would like to create my own setting and belong to nothing else. My living unit will be comprised of the six habitation units which I construct, and my homeland will be in-between them."

== Education ==
- 1987– The École Nationale Supérieure d'Arts Paris-Cergy, Paris, France
- 1987– The École Nationale Supérieure des Beaux-arts, Paris, France
- 1988– The Institute des Hautes Études en Arts Plastiques (IHEAP), Paris, France
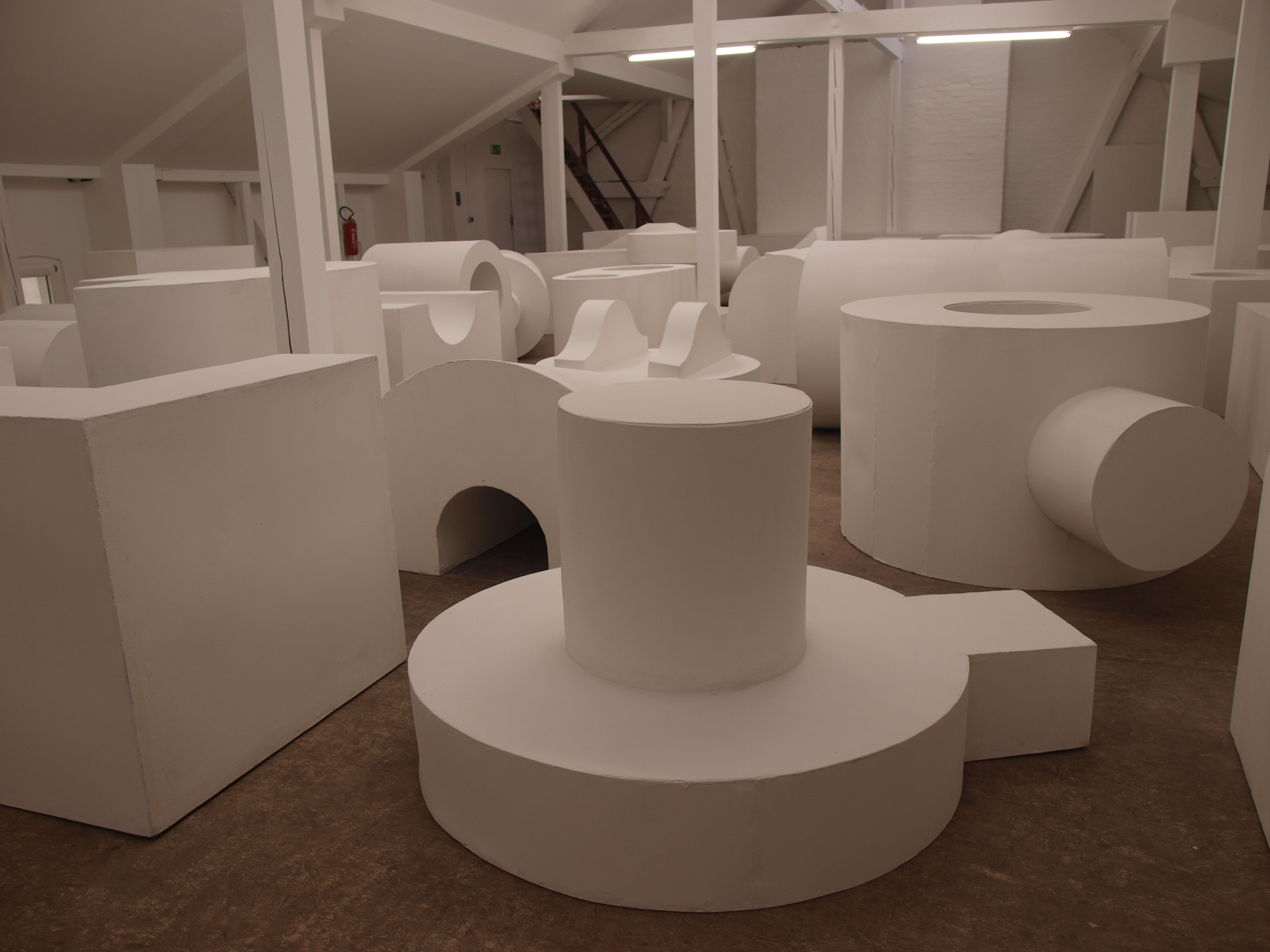
  Absalon.Disposition.1990

== Videos ==
- 1991– Proposals for Habitation (3:30min)
- 1992– Solutions (7:25 min)
- 1993– Noises (3:23 min)
- 1993– Battle (62:24 min)
- 1993– Mr. Leloup Life (31min)
- 1993– Assassinations (33 min)

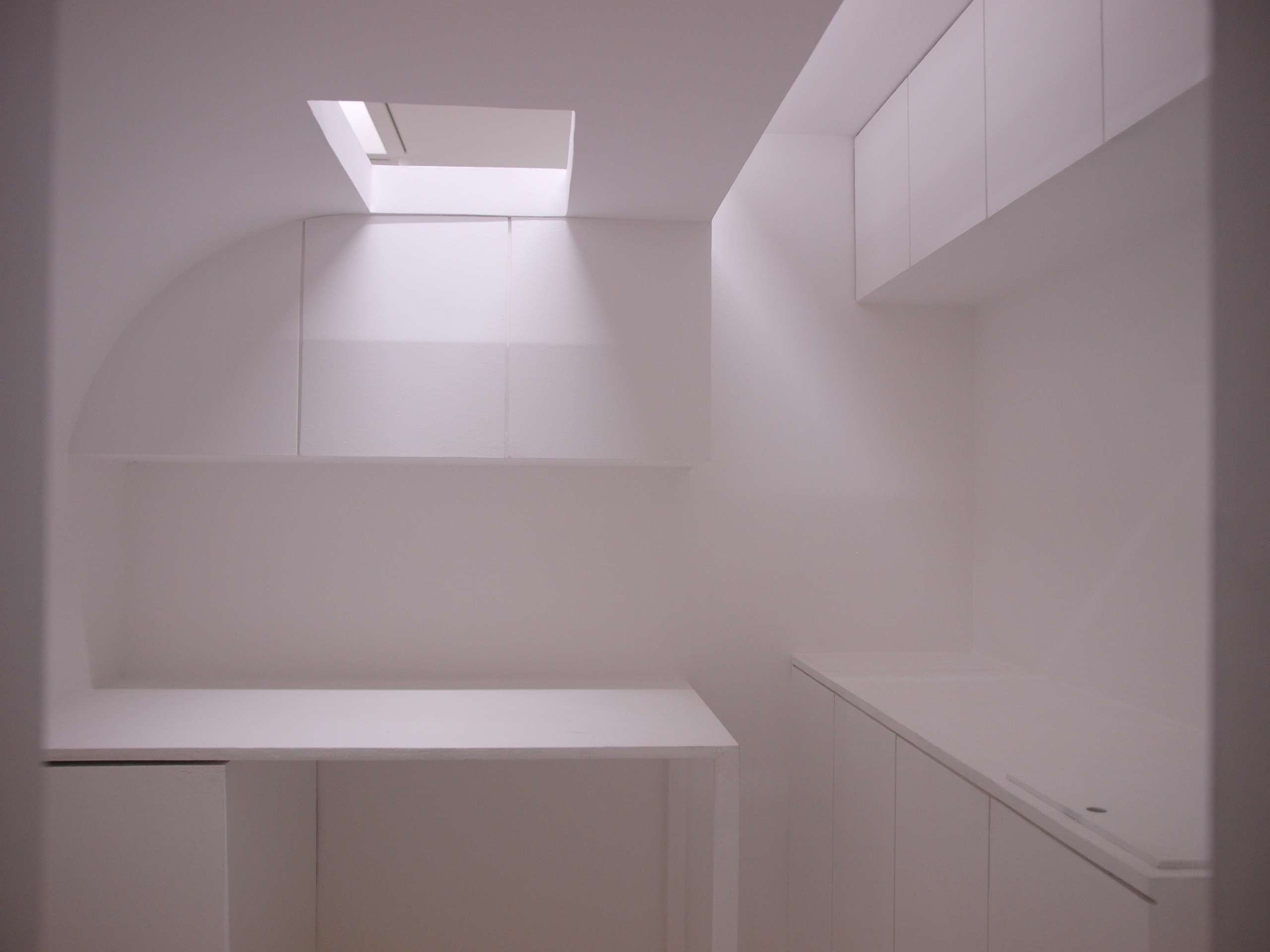
Absalon.Cell No.2 (inside view)

== Solo exhibitions ==
- 1989– Centre d'Art Contemporain d'Ivry (CREDAC), Ivry-sur-Seine, France (catalogue)
- 1990–"Proposals for Habitation (Scale 1:1)," Artists Studio, Aika Brown Gallery, Jerusalem (catalogue)
- 1990-Musée Sainte-Croix, Poitiers, France (catalogue)
- 1990–"Cells," Galerie Crousel-Robelin / Bama, Paris
- 1991– "Compartments," Kunstlerhaus, Stuttgart
- 1991– "Compartments" Kulturbehrde, Hamburg
- 1991– "Compartments," Galerie Crousel-Robelin / Bama, Paris
- 1992– Tel Aviv Museum of Art, Tel Aviv (catalogue)
- 1992– Galerie Etienne Ficheroulle, Brussels
- 1992– "A Universe without Objects," FNAC, Hôtel des Arts, Paris
- 1992– Kaye Pesblum Gallery, Helsinki
- 1993– "Cells," Musée d'Art Moderne de la Ville de Paris (catalogue)
- 1993– "Battle," Galerie Crousel-Robelin / Bama and Jean-René Fleurieu, Paris
- 1993– Carmelitenkloster, Frankfurt
- 1993– Galerie Luis Campana, Cologne
- 1994– Galerie Crousel-Robelin / Bama, Paris
- 1994– "Cells," Tretyakov Gallery, Moscow
- 1994– De Appel, Amsterdam (catalogue)
- 1994– Carré d'Art, Musée d'Art Contemporain, Nîmes, France (catalogue)
- 1994– "Noises," Chisenhale Gallery, London
- 1994– "Disposition," Château d'Aulteribe, Sermentizon, France
- 1994– Attitudes Gallery, Geneva
- 1995– "Cells," Chisenhale Gallery, London
- 1995– "Cells," Kunstverein, Hamburg
- 1996– "Cells," Douglas Hyde Gallery, Dublin
- 1996– "Absalon: Complete Video Works," Oriel Gallery, Cardiff
- 1997– Galerie Chantal Crousel, Paris
- 1997– L’Institut d ‘Art et Techniques de Bretagne Occidentale (IATBO), Brest, France 1997– Kunsthalle Zurich
- 1999– "Cells, Models & Drawings," Goldie Paley Gallery at Moore College, Philadelphia (catalogue)
- 2005– Platform Garanti, Istanbul
- 2005– "The Intruders," off-site program, Pavillon de l’Arsenal, Musée de la Ville de Paris
- 2005– Les Visiteurs programme, Chartreuse de Villeneuve-lès-Avignon, France
- 2006– "Battle," Ballet Preljocaj, opening of the Pavillon Noir, Centre Choréographique National, Aix en-Provence
- 2007– "Marie-Ange Guilleminot présente Absalon," La Chappelle de Visitandines, Amiens
- 2008– Passerelle Centre d’Art, Brest, France
- 2010– KW Institute for Contemporary Art, Berlin (catalogue)
- 2012– Museum Boijmans Van Beuningen, Rotterdam (catalogue)
- 2013– Tel Aviv Museum of Art, Tel Aviv (catalogue)

== Selected group exhibitions ==
- 1988– Atelier du Parvis de Beaubourg, Centre Georges Pompidou, Paris
- 1989 – "Pas à côté pas n'importe où (Not a side, not anywhere)," Villa Arson, Nice
- 1989 – "Carte blanche à Jean de Loisy (Free card for Jean de Loisy)," Centre d'Art Contemporain d'Ivry (CREDAC), Ivry-sur-Seine
- 1990 – "Resistance: Absalon, Art in Ruins, Véronique Joumard, Serge Kliaving," Musée Sainte-Croix, Poitiers (catalogue)
- 1990 "Lignes de mire 1 (Lines of Sight)," Fondation Cartier, Jouy-en-Josas, France
- 1990– "Le Cinq (the Five)," Tramway, Glasgow; curator: Jean de Loisy (catalogue)
- 1990 – "VII Ateliers Internationaux des Pays de Loire" Fonds Régional d’Art Contemporain (FRAC); curator: Jean-François Taddei (catalogue; text: Hans-Ulrich Obrist)
- 1991 – "Collection of the CAPC Museum," Musée d’Art Contemporain (CAPC), Bordeaux
- 1991– "Movements 1 & 2," Centre Georges Pompidou, Paris; curator: Jean-Pierre Bordaz (catalogue)
- 1992 – Documenta 9, Kassel; curator: Jan Hoet (catalogue)
- 1992– "New Acquisitions," Caisse des Dépôts et Consignations, Paris
- 1992– Third International Istanbul Biennale; curator: Vasif Kortun
- 1993 – "L’Image dans le tapis (The Image in the Carpet)," Arsenale, Venice Biennale; curator: Jean de Loisy (catalogue)
- 1993– "Hôtel Carlton Palace, Chambre 763," 207 boulevard Raspail, Paris; curator: Hans-Ulrich Obrist
- 1993– "Lieux de la vie moderne (Places of Modern Life)," Le Quartier
- 1993– Centre d’Art Contemporain, Quimper, France
- 1993– "Le milieu du monde (The Middle of the World)," Villa Saint
- 1994 – "Hors limites (Out of Bounds)," Musée National d’Art Moderne, Centre Georges Pompidou, Paris; curator: Jean de Loisy (catalogue)
- 1994– "Même si c’est la nuit (Even if it is Night)," Musée d’Art Contemporain (CAPC), Bordeaux; curator: Jean-Louis Froment
- 1994– "Le saut dans le vide (A Leap into the Void)," Artists House, Moscow (catalogue)
- 1994– "Beats," Collection de la Caisse des Dépôts et Consignations, Belém Cultural Centre, Lisbon
- 1994– "Un papillon sur la roue (A Butterfly on a Wheel)," Espace d’Art Moderne et Contemporain, Toulouse
- 1995 – "Rudiments d’un musée possible 2 (Rudiments for a Possible Museum 2)," Musée d’Art Moderne et Contemporain (MAMCO), Geneva
- 1995 – "Currents ‘95: Familiar Places," Institute of Contemporary Art (ICA), Boston
- 1995– "Artistes/Architectes (Artists/ Architects)," Le Nouveau Musée, Villeurbanne, France
- 1995 – "Architecture(s)," Musée d’art contemporain (CAPC), Bordeaux
- 1995– "Insomnie (Insomnia)," Centre d’Art Contemporain, Domaine de Kerguehennec, Bretagne
- 1996– "Decadent Future: Art and Architecture," Centre for Visual Arts, Cardiff
- 1996– "Vision and Reality," Louisiana Museum of Modern Art, Humlebaek, Denmark
- 1996– "House, Body, Identity: Construction of Identities," Museum Moderner Kunst Stiftung Ludwig (MUMOK), Vienna; National Gallery, Prague
- 1997- "Parisien(ne)s", Camden Arts Center / Institute of International Visual Arts (inIVA), London
- 2004– "Contrepoint (Counterpoint)," Louvre Museum, Paris
- 2004– "Living Inside the Grid," New Museum of Contemporary Art, New York
- 2005 – "Yona in Bezalel," Bezalel Gallery, Tel Aviv; curators: Sarit Shapira, Sandra Weil (catalogue)
- 2006 – "Au delà des images (Beyond Images)," Galerie Sfeir-Semler, Beirut
- 2006– "Sip my Ocean," Louisiana Museum of Modern Art, Humlebaek, Denmark
- 2006- "Laboratoire pour un avenir incertain" curated by Hou Hanru, La Force de l'Art, Grand Palais, Paris
- 2007– "The Unhomely," 2nd International Biennial of Contemporary Art, Seville
- 2007-- "Volksgarten: Politics of Belonging," Kunsthaus Graz, Austria
- 2009 – "Die Kunst Ist Super! (Art Is Super!)," Hamburger Bahnhof Museum, Berlin
- 2017- "Art making city", "Growing in Difference", the 7th Shenzhen Hong Kong Bi-City Biennial of Architecture and Urbanism, curated by Hou Hanru, Shenzhen, China
- 2021- "ABSALON ABSALON" CAPC musée d'art contemporain de Bordeaux, France

== Collections ==
- Centre Georges Pompidou, Paris
- Musée d’Art Moderne de la Ville de Paris (ARC)
- Centre National des Arts Plastiques (CNAP), Paris
- Fond Régional d’Art Contemporain (FRAC) Languedoc-Roussillon, Montpellier
- Fond Régional d’Art Contemporain (FRAC) Aquitaine, Bordeaux
- Musée d’Art Contemporain (CAPC), Bordeaux
- Musée d’Art Contemporain (MAC), Marseilles
- Musée d’Art Moderne de Saint-étienne
- Carré d’Art, Nîmes, France
- Centre Régional d’Art Contemporain, Grenoble, France
- La Collection de la Caisse des Dépôts et Consignations, Paris
- Tate Gallery, London
- Friedrich Christian Flick Collection at Hamburger Bahnhof, Berlin
- Louisiana Museum of Modern Art, Humlebaek, Denmark
- Magasin 3 Stockholm Konsthall
- Malmö Konsthall, Sweden
- Kunstmuseum Liechtenstein, Vaduz
- Institute of Contemporary Art (ICA), Boston
- The Israel Museum, Jerusalem
- Tel Aviv Museum of Art
