= Helle Ryslinge =

Danish director and screenwriter

- Born: 10 January 1944 (age 82); Copenhagen, Denmark
- Occupations: Actress, filmmaker, screenwriter

Helle Ryslinge (born 10 January 1944) is a Danish director, screenwriter, playwright and actress.

== Life and career ==
Born in Copenhagen, Ryslinge started her career in the 1970s fringe theatre, writing and performing alongside Anne Marie Helger in the cabaret show Dameattraktioner.

After having worked as an actress in several films and TV-shows, she served as a screenwriter in Koks i kulissen (1983), an adaptation of Dameattraktioner directed by Christian Braad Thomsen. She made her directorial debut three years later with the satirical comedy Flamberede hjerter, which was a critical and commercial success. Her following film Sirup was entered into the main competition at the 47th edition of the Venice Film Festival, winning the Silver Lion for best screenplay, and got some commercial success, ranking as the third highest grossing Danish film of the year. Her last feature film, Halalabad Blues, had a troubled production and divided critics, leading the director to decide to leave filmmaking.

== Filmography ==
- Flamberede hjerter (1986)
- Sirup (1990)
- Jungledyret Hugo (1993)
- Carlo og Ester (1994)
- Jungledyret Hugo 2 - den store filmhelt (1996)
- Halalabad Blues (2002)
- Larger Than Life (documentary, 2003)
