= The Only Witness =

- Directed by: Mikhail Pandoursky
- Written by: Nikolai Nikiforov
- Cinematography: Ivo Furnadzhiev
- Music by: Valeri Milovansky
- Release date: 1990
- Language: Bulgarian

The Only Witness (Bulgarian: Edinstveniyat svidetel) is a 1990 Bulgarian drama film directed by Mikhail Pandoursky. It was entered into the main competition at the 47th Venice International Film Festival; for his performance Oleg Borisov won the Volpi Cup for best actor.

== Cast ==
- Oleg Borisov : Svidetel / Christo Panov
- Kiril Variyski : Shofyor
- Lyuben Chatalov : Vladimir Panov
- Iren Krivoshieva : Georginova
