= Laura Adler's Last Love Affair =

- Directed by: Avraham Heffner
- Written by: Avraham Heffner
- Cinematography: David Gurfinkel
- Music by: Shem-Tov Levy
- Release date: 1990
- Language: Hebrew

Laura Adler's Last Love Affair (Hebrew: אהבתה האחרונה של לורה אדלר, also known as The Last Love Affair of Laura Adler) is a 1990 Israeli drama film written and directed by Avraham Heffner. It was entered into the main competition at the 47th Venice International Film Festival.

== Cast ==
- Rita Zohar : Laura
- Menashe Warshavsky : Savitch
- Avraham Mor : Menashe
- Shulamit Adar : Becky
