= Absalom Dlamini =

Liswati footballer

Personal information
- Date of birth: 5 August 1984 (age 42)
- Position: Midfielder

Senior career*
Years	Team	Apps	(Gls)
2002–2003	Illovo FC Ubombo		
2003–2018	Royal Leopards		

International career
2004–2008	Swaziland	16	(0)
- * Club domestic league appearances and goals

Absalom Dlamini (born 5 August 1984) is a former Liswati footballer who played for the Royal Leopards and the Swaziland national football team. He played the position of defensive midfielder.

== Career statistics ==
=== International ===
Appearances and goals by national team and year
National team	Year	Apps	Goals
Swaziland	2004	1	0
Swaziland	2005	–	
Swaziland	2006	3	0
Swaziland	2007	6	0
Swaziland	2008	6	0
Total		16	0
