= Boltanski =

Boltanski is a surname. Notable people with the surname include:

- Christian Boltanski (1944–2021), French sculptor, painter, and filmmaker
- Christophe Boltanski (born 1962), French journalist, writer, and chronicler
- Luc Boltanski (born 1940), French sociologist, brother of Christian
