= Absalom Koiner =

American politician

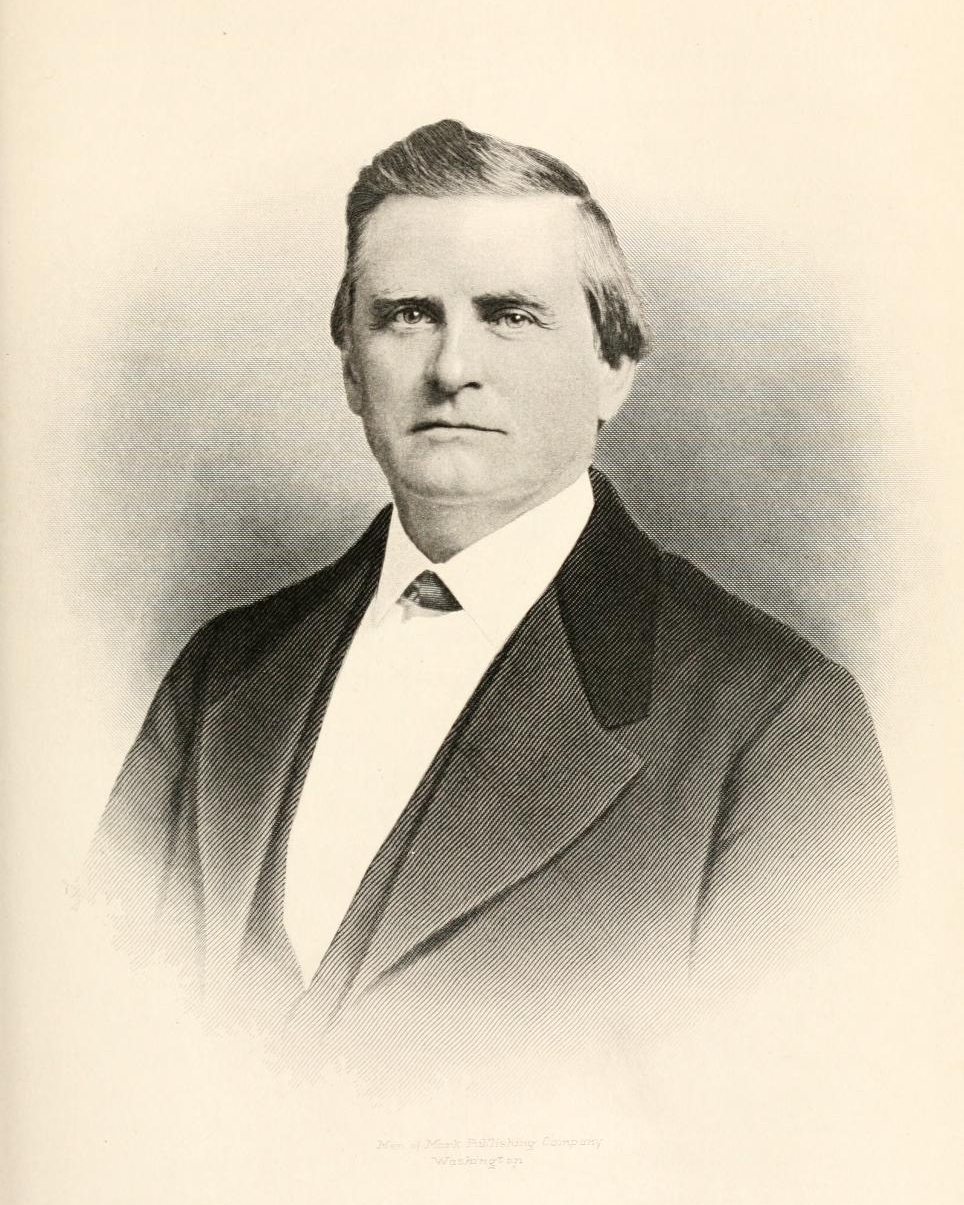

Member of the Virginia Senate from the 9th district
- In office December 5, 1877 – December 4, 1889
- Preceded by: Alexander B. Cochran
- Succeeded by: Edward Echols

Member of the Virginia House of Delegates from Augusta County
- In office January 1, 1874 – December 1, 1875 Serving with J. Marshall Hanger and Alexander H. H. Stuart
- Preceded by: Alexander B. Lightner
- Succeeded by: J. D. Craig
- In office December 5, 1853 – December 3, 1855
- Preceded by: John A. Tate
- Succeeded by: Adam McChesney

Personal details
- Born: August 5, 1824 Augusta, Virginia, U.S.
- Died: December 31, 1920 (aged 96) Augusta, Virginia, U.S.
- Party: Democratic
- Spouse: Virginia Koiner (m. 1850)
- Education: University of Virginia
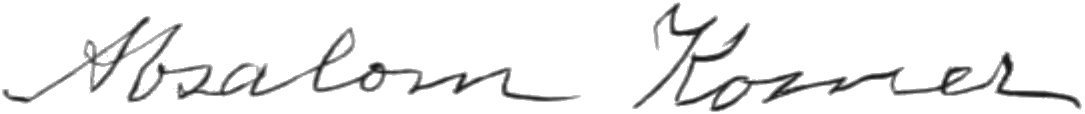
- Signature

Military service
- Allegiance: Confederate States
- Branch/service: Confederate States Army
- Years of service: 1861–1865
- Rank: Lieutenant colonel
- Unit: 5th Virginia Infantry
- Battles/wars: American Civil War

Absalom Koiner (August 5, 1824 – December 31, 1920) was an American lawyer, soldier and politician who served in the Virginia House of Delegates and Virginia Senate.

During the American Civil War, Koiner served as an officer in the 5th Virginia Infantry Regiment, part of the famed Stonewall Brigade of the Confederate Army of Northern Virginia. He is listed as Captain of Company H, the "Augusta Rifles," when the regiment was created on May 7th, 1861. Koiner was promoted to Major on September 11, 1861.
