= HDMS Absalon =

At least two ships of the Royal Danish Navy have borne the name HDMS Absalon:

- HDMS Absalon (1862) an armoured schooner rated as a cruiser in service from 1862 until 1908.
- HDMS Absalon (L16) an Absalon-class support ship launched in 2005.
