= Cold Light of Day (1989 film) =

- Promotional artwork
- Directed by: Fhiona Louise
- Written by: Fhiona Louise
- Produced by: Richard Driscoll
- Starring: Bob Flag; Martin Byrne-Quinn; Geoffrey Greenhill; Mark Hawkins; Andrew Edmands; Claire King
- Cinematography: Nigel Axworthy
- Edited by: Leroy Stamps
- Music by: Paul Stuart Davies
- Production company: Creative Artists Pictures
- Distributed by: Creative Artists Pictures
- Release dates: September 1989 (Venice Film Festival); 3 August 1990 (London ICA)
- Running time: 80 minutes
- Country: United Kingdom
- Language: English

Cold Light of Day is a 1989 British horror film written and directed by Fhiona Louise, and starring Bob Flag, Martin Byrne-Quinn, and Geoffrey Greenhill. Based on the crimes of serial killer Dennis Nilsen, the film is a fictionalized account of his various murders leading up to his apprehension by authorities. Louise, who was 21 years old at the time of the film's release, was the youngest woman ever to direct a feature film.

== Plot ==
In late-1970s London, middle-aged civil servant Jordan March, apprehended by authorities, recounts the various murders he committed to Inspector Simmons, which are relayed through flashbacks. Jordan's killing spree began with a young former art student, Joe, whom he meets at a pub. After the two have drinks, Joe returns home with Jordan. Jordan finds Joe attractive, agrees to let Joe stay in his flat until he can regain stability. The next morning, Jordan spies on Joe as he takes a bath. Joe and Jordan have coffee at a cafe, but their conversation soon turns contentious. After Jordan departs for work, Joe cruises a young man for sex in the cafe bathroom.

Jordan soon become possessive of the young and freewheeling Joe, who gradually unabashedly takes advantage of him. One morning, while Joe lies sleeping, Jordan strangles him to death, before collapsing atop his body. He then experiences a flashback of the death of his grandfather as a child.

He keeps Joe's corpse in his bed, engaging in necrophilia with the body. Later, while walking through a red-light district, Jordan is approached by a female prostitute who ushers him into her flat. She attempts to seduce him, but he rebuffs her efforts; nonetheless, he pays her for her efforts before nervously departing.

Later, Jordan returns to the cafe and is approached by a young homeless man who asks for a cigarette. Though Jordan is annoyed, the man manages to convince Jordan to let him stay with him. Once at his flat, Jordan attacks the man, strangling him as he sits in an armchair before drowning him in his bathtub. After the murder, Jordan falls into a drunken sleep, and has nightmares about his grandfather's death, which he witnessed as a child. The following day, Jordan dismembers and skins the man's corpse, flushing heaps of flesh down the toilet, and boiling his severed head.

Jordan encounters another young punk, Stephen, on the streets of London, and saves him from a drug overdose. Stephen returns with Jordan to his flat, where he locks himself in the bathroom and injects himself with heroin. After stumbling out of the bathroom, Stephen collapses, suffering another overdose. Jordan proceeds to strangle him to death with a belt.

The next day, Julie, another tenant who lives beneath Jordan's flat, finds her bathroom plumbing appears to be clogged, and phones the landlord to inspect it. She informs Jordan of this, which causes him to panic. Jordan brings pieces of Stephen's flesh and organs outside, where he disposes of them in a storm drain. Meanwhile, the plumber inspecting the building notices a stench of decay, and finds remnants of human flesh in the pipes, leading him to contact the police. Jordan is arrested, and his flat dismantled by police. Beneath the floorboards, they uncover Joe's corpse, along with the dismembered bodies of the two other men.

== Cast ==
- Bob Flag as Jordan March
- Martin Byrne-Quinn as Joe
- Geoffrey Greenhill as Inspector Simmons
- Mark Hawkins as The Poor Boy
- Andrew Edmans as Stephen
- Jackie Cox as Julie Stay
- Bill Merrow as Albert Green
- Claire King as Prostitute

== Production ==
Cold Light of Day was written and directed by Fhiona Louise, a 21-year-old acting student. She wrote the screenplay for the film while studying at the Lee Strasberg Theatre and Film Institute's London campus, where she was studying under American actress Marianna Hill. Martin Byrne-Quinn, who portrayed Joe, was a classmate of Louise's, whom she asked to partake in the project.

== Release ==
Cold Light of Day premiered at the 47th Venice International Film Festival in 1989. Louise would later recollect that, at the screening "at least a quarter of the audience walked out, but the people who remained stood up and applauded afterwards. They either loved it, or hated it, which was great. There can't be a better compliment for a young filmmaker."

=== Critical response ===
Time Out wrote that the film "has the lighting and look of an Andy Warhol home movie—heads cut off, lots of static shots of men on sofas—and a soundtrack composed of deep breathing, the pounding of a demolition ball, and church bells. Little light is thrown by March in the police interrogations on the reasons for his actions ('I didn't mean to. It just happened') or by the film itself."

=== Home media ===
In October 2020, Arrow Films released the film on Blu-ray.
