= Echoes from a Sombre Empire =

Echoes From a Sombre Empire
- Directed by: Werner Herzog
- Written by: Werner Herzog
- Produced by: Werner Herzog; Galeshka Moravioff; Walter Saxer
- Starring: Michael Manuel Gustav Goldsmith; Werner Herzog; David Dacko; Jean-Bédel Bokassa (stock footage)
- Cinematography: Jörg Schmidt-Reitwein; Martin Manz
- Edited by: Rainer Standke; Thomas Balkenhol
- Production companies: Films sans Frontières; Sera Filmproduktion; Werner Herzog Filmproduktion
- Distributed by: Werner Herzog Filmproduktion
- Release date: 1990
- Running time: 93 minutes
- Countries: Germany; France
- Languages: French; German; English

A smoking chimpanzee in the final sequence

Echoes From a Sombre Empire (German: Echos aus einem düsteren Reich) is a 1990 documentary film by Werner Herzog about Jean-Bédel Bokassa.

== Content ==
Unlike most of Herzog's documentaries, the main body of the film does not provide any narration or commentary by Herzog himself. Instead, the film follows journalist Michael Goldsmith as he revisits the Central African Republic, where he was imprisoned and tortured by Bokassa's regime. Goldsmith interviews two of Bokassa's wives, several of Bokassa's children (including the "true" daughter Martine), two of Bokassa's lawyers, and Central African Republic President David Dacko. Bokassa himself appears only in stock footage.

Goldsmith was working as a French journalist when he was imprisoned after reporting on Bokassa's elaborate coronation. In the film, he says that he had written his report and used a telex machine to send it to his employer. There was a power failure during the transmission, causing the text to become jumbled. The message was intercepted by the government of the CAE, who decided that it was a coded message, and that Goldsmith was a South African spy. Goldsmith was taken to a prison, where he says that he was beaten personally by Bokassa, almost to death.

== Production ==
Herzog wished to interview Bokassa himself, who was in prison during the making of the film. The film crew obtained official permission from then-president André Kolingba, and Bokassa was reportedly willing to give the interview. Just before going to the prison, however, Herzog and the film crew were arrested and expelled from the country by the Minister of the Interior.

The film begins with Herzog reading a statement from Goldsmith, who had disappeared in Liberia during its first civil war between the film's shooting and its completion. The statement describes a dream that Goldsmith has, accompanied by images of the migration of the Christmas Island red crab. Herzog again used imagery from the crab migration in his later film Invincible.
