= Avshalom, Sinai =

Former Israeli settlement in Sinai, Egypt

Coordinates: 31°12′46″N 34°12′8″E

Avshalom (Hebrew: אבשלום) was an Israeli settlement in the Sinai Peninsula.

== History ==
The settlement was founded in 1972. It was initially named Merkaz Sadot ("Sadot Center") and later Yad On ("Hand of Strength"). In 1979, it was renamed in honour of Avshalom Feinberg, a leader of the Nili espionage network who had died in Sinai during World War I. Avshalom was dismantled three years later as a result of the Camp David Accords. In 1990, a new community settlement by the same name was founded in Israel.
