= Absalom (1853) =

Australian ketch

Coordinates: 30.83°S 153.01°E

History

New South Wales
- Name: Absalom
- Owner: Mr J Hubbard
- Port of registry: Sydney
- Identification: Registration number: 170/1853; Official number: 32407
- Builder: David Roberts, Brisbane Water, New South Wales, Australia
- Completed: 1853
- Fate: Wrecked March 29, 1863

General characteristics
- Type: Ketch
- Tonnage: 25 GRT, or 33 tons
- Length: 60 feet (18 m) LOA, or 14.84000 m
- Beam: 14 ft 6 in (4.42 m), or 3.90100 m
- Draught: 5 ft 6 in (1.68 m) when loaded, or 1.64500 m
- Depth of hold: 5 ft 4 in (1.63 m)

The Absalom was a wooden ketch that was wrecked at the Macleay River bar at Trial Bay, New South Wales in 1863.

== History ==
The Absalom was built for the timber trade, and W. Pickett was to be her commander. She spent the early years of her career traveling to the Shoalhaven. By 1857 she had moved to include Wollongong. She spent much of 1858 traveling to Brisbane Water.

During 1861 she made trips to the Shoalhaven and Moruya River. During one of these trips, she came across two crew members of the Cambrian Packet, which had sunk in a squall off Port Aiken. The ship's master, Edward Jones, and a seaman named Dalton kept themselves afloat for over an hour before they were rescued by the Absalom, which returned them both to Sydney.

== Wreck ==
By 1862, the Absalom was trading in the Macleay River, with J Fraser as master. On 29 March 1863, she was attempting to beat out of the river, but missed stays and ran upon the South Spit at the Heads, and in a few minutes went to pieces. Mr McKenzie, the pilot of the area, was quickly in his boat, and rendered all the assistance that could be given. All hands were saved, but the vessel and cargo, consisting of more than six hundred bushels of maize, were totally lost.

The crew were returned to Sydney by the Woolloomooloo. The Absalom was uninsured, and belonged to Mr J Hubbard.
