= Jerusalem District Police =

Israeli police department

Jerusalem Police
- Common name: Jerusalem City Police Department

Agency overview
- Formed: 1948; 78 years ago

Jurisdictional structure
- Operations jurisdiction: Israel
- Map of Jerusalem Police's jurisdiction
- Legal jurisdiction: Jerusalem City
- Governing body: Ministry of Public Security (Israel)
- General nature: Local civilian police

Operational structure
- Officers: 3,800
- Civilians: 460
- Agency executive: Doron Turgeman, Chief of Police

Jerusalem District Police (Hebrew: משטרת מחוז ירושלים) is a regional district command of the Israel Police. It is considered one of the oldest police commands in Israel.

== History ==
Jerusalem's police history goes back to the British Mandate and before that to the administration of Ottoman Syria.

The Jerusalem District's current boundaries include municipal Jerusalem as well as suburbs in Greater Jerusalem including Beit Shemesh, Mevasseret Zion, Abu Gosh, Kiryat Yearim, Givat Ze'ev and other regional councils.

There are 734,000 people within the jurisdiction, approximately 68% of them Jewish, 28% Muslim and 2% Christian.

== Jerusalem Police Commander ==
- Yeshurun Sheif (1948–1949)
- Levi Abrahami (1949–1958)
- Yoav Pelleg (Felic Kamp) (1958–1961)
- Shaul Rosolio (1962–1970), commander of the Southern District
- David Ofer (1970–1972)
- Aharon Shloush (1972–1973)
- Haim Tavori (1973–1975)
- Arieh Ibtzen (1975–1981)
- Joshua Caspi (1981–1984)
- Abraham Turjeman (1984–1985)
- Rahamim Komfort (1985–1990), Commander of the Southern and Jerusalem District
- Haim Ellbalads (January 1991 – 1993)
- Rafi Pelled (February–April 1993)
- Yehuda Wilk (March 1993–May 1994)
- Arieh Amit (1994–1997)
- Yair Itzchaky (1997–2000)
- Michael (Mickey) Levy (December 2000 – 2003)
- Ilan Franco (July 2004–June 2007)
- Aharon Franco (June 2007–March 2011)
- Nisso Shacham (May 2011 – 2012)
- Yossi Parienty (July 2012 – 2014)
- Moshe 'Chico' Edri (2014–2016)
- Yoram Ha-Levy (2016–2019)
- Doron Yadid (2019–2021)
- Doron Turgeman (since 2021)
