= Avraham Heffner =

Israeli film director

- אברהם הפנר
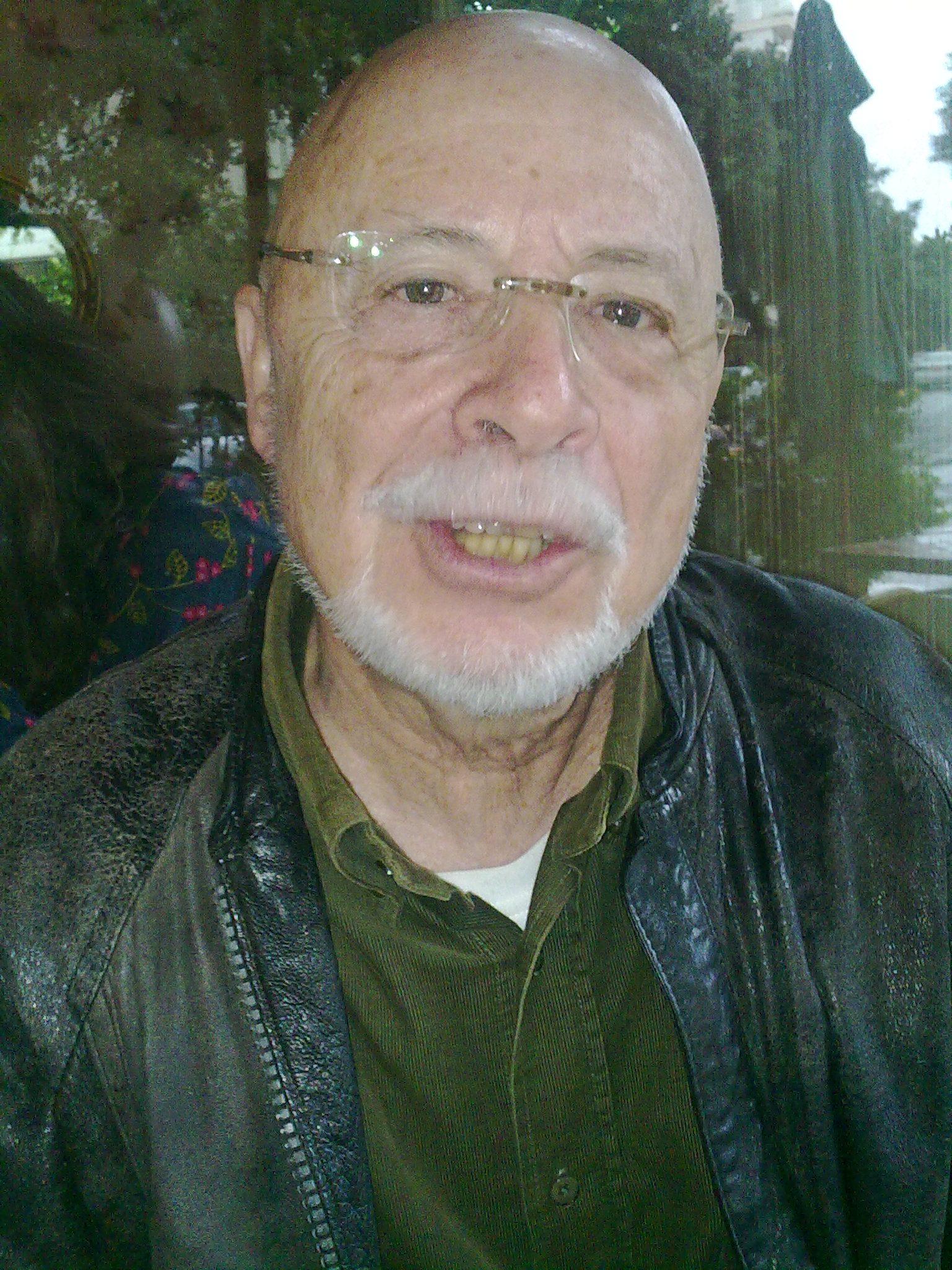
- Heffner in Tel-Aviv, October 2009
- Born: 7 May 1935; Haifa, Mandatory Palestine
- Died: 19 September 2014 (aged 79); Tel Aviv, Israel
- Occupations: Film director, screenwriter, author, lecturer

Avraham Heffner (Hebrew: אברהם הפנר; 7 May 1935 – 19 September 2014) was an Israeli film and television director, screenwriter, author and Professor Emeritus at the Tel-Aviv University. He was a recipient of the Ophir Award for lifetime achievements.

== Biography ==
Heffner graduated from the Hebrew Reali School in Haifa and served in the IDF with the Nahal Army Band. After his IDF service, he studied French literature at the Sorbonne, Paris. His love for the cinema began, according to him, at the age of 17. He began his career as an actor (in Uri Zohar's Hor BaLevana).

His first movie as director was Slow Down (1967), an adaptation of a short story by Simone de Beauvoir, which won him the Silver Lion Award at the 1969 Venice Film Festival. In the 1960s and the 1970s he was among the Israeli directors creating more personal and social films (in the "New Sensitivity" genre), films that were influenced from the Avant-garde-European cinema. The most significant example of these types of films is Heffner's first feature, But Where Is Daniel Wax?, which he wrote and directed. But Where Is Daniel Wax?, Heffner's most important and famous film, is considered by film critics and Israeli film researchers to be the best Israeli movie of all time.

Two other films of his, Aunt Clara (1977) and Laura Adler's Last Love Affair, are considered to be a eulogy to the old Yiddish speakers, European Jews who live in Israel. Aunt Clara, a semi-autobiographical film about Heffner's own family, tells the story of three Poland-born aunts in Israel, who are looking after their young nieces. Laura Adler's Last Love Affair is a eulogy to the Israeli Yiddish theater and its old actors.

The television film he created in 1998, Eretz Ktana, Ish Gadol [Small Country, Great Man], is a cynical look at the ever-changing State of Israel of the 1990s and the Zionist myths, which in Heffner's opinion, are now gone.

Heffner lectured for many years on filmmaking and screenwriting at the Tel Aviv University.

In 2004, Heffner won the Ophir Award for his life-time of achievements in Israeli Cinema. His films are held at the Jewish film archives.

Heffner died on 19 September 2014.

== Influence ==
Heffner was a screenwriting lecturer in the mid-1970s at the Tel Aviv University, and influenced many well-known Israeli filmmakers such as Eitan Green, Renen Shor, Ari Folman, Hagai Levi, Menashe Noy and Dover Kosashvili.

== Filmography ==
- Slow Down (Short film, 1968)
- Seance (Short film, 1969)
- But Where Is Daniel Wax? (1972)
- Aunt Clara (1977)
- The Winchell Affair (1979)
- Laura Adler's Last Love Affair (1990)
- Eretz Ktana, Ish Gadol [Small Country, Great Man] (1998)
