= Mount Absalom =

- Location within Antarctica

Highest point
- Coordinates: 80°24′S 25°24′W

Geography
- Continent: Antarctica
- Parent range: Herbert Mountains

Mount Absalom is the southernmost and highest (1,640 m) mountain of the Herbert Mountains, in the central part of the Shackleton Range. It was first mapped in 1957 by the Commonwealth Trans-Antarctic Expedition (CTAE) and named for Henry W.L. Absalom, a member of the Scientific Committee on the CTAE of 1955–58.
