= 2011 in film =

The following is an overview of the events of 2011 in film, including the highest-grossing films, film festivals, award ceremonies and a list of films released and notable deaths. More film sequels were released in 2011 than any other year before it, with 27 sequels released.

== Evaluation of the year ==
Richard Brody of The New Yorker observed that the best films of 2011 "exalt the metaphysical, the fantastical, the transformative, the fourth-wall-breaking, or simply the impossible, and—remarkably—do so ... These films depart from 'reality' ... not in order to forget the irrefutable but in order to face it, to think about it, to act on it more freely". Film critic and filmmaker Scout Tafoya of RogerEbert.com considers the year of 2011 as the best year for cinema, countering the notion of 1939 being film's best year overall, citing examples such as Drive, The Tree of Life, Once Upon a Time in Anatolia, Keyhole, Contagion, The Adventures of Tintin, and Sherlock Holmes: A Game of Shadows. He stated that "2011 housed not just some of the greatest art films of our age, but a revolution in the language of blockbuster filmmaking. One big-budget action film after another used digital cameras to show the world behind explosions in starker, stranger light, while constructing a backbone of classical ideas and images."

== Highest-grossing films ==
The top 10 films released in 2011 by worldwide gross are as follows:

Highest-grossing films of 2011
Rank	Title	Distributor	Worldwide gross
1	Harry Potter and the Deathly Hallows – Part 2	Warner Bros.	$1,341,511,219
2	Transformers: Dark of the Moon	Paramount	$1,123,794,079
3	Pirates of the Caribbean: On Stranger Tides	Disney	$1,045,713,802
4	The Twilight Saga: Breaking Dawn – Part 1	Summit	$712,205,856
5	Mission: Impossible – Ghost Protocol	Paramount	$694,713,380
6	Kung Fu Panda 2	Paramount	$665,692,281
7	Fast Five	Universal	$626,137,675
8	The Hangover Part II	Warner Bros.	$586,764,305
9	The Smurfs	Sony	$563,749,323
10	Cars 2	Disney	$559,852,396

=== Box office records ===
2011 was the first year to have three films cross the billion-dollar milestone, surpassing the previous year's record of two films and also the first time when at least 10 films grossed more than $500 million worldwide (in 11th and 12th place, Puss in Boots and Sherlock Holmes: A Game of Shadows also earned over $500 million making it twelve films to do so)

- Pirates of the Caribbean: On Stranger Tides grossed $1,045,713,802, becoming the second film in the franchise to have grossed over $1 billion, and the 37th-highest-grossing film of all time.
- Harry Potter and the Deathly Hallows – Part 2 grossed $1,342,511,219, becoming the third-highest-grossing film of all time during its theatrical run, the highest-grossing film in the Harry Potter franchise, the highest grossing Warner Bros film and the highest grossing book adaptation and the highest of 2011 worldwide.
  - In the US and Canada, it set single-day and opening-weekend records, with $91,071,119 and $169,189,427, respectively. In addition, the film set a worldwide opening-weekend record with $483,189,427.
- Transformers: Dark of the Moon grossed $1,123,794,079 and is currently the highest-grossing in the franchise. It also held the record as the highest-grossing film worldwide ever distributed only by Paramount for 11 years until it was surpassed by Top Gun: Maverick in 2022.
  - The film became DreamWorks Pictures' highest grossing film of all time, dethroning Shrek 2 (2004).
- Pirates of the Caribbean became the first franchise to have more than one film gross over $1 billion, with On Stranger Tides joining 2006's Dead Man's Chest.
  - On Stranger Tides also became the fifth film of the decade to surpass the billion-dollar milestone, breaking the previous record of four films (The Lord of the Rings: The Return of the King in 2003, Pirates of the Caribbean: Dead Man's Chest in 2006, The Dark Knight in 2008, and Avatar in 2009) during the 2000s.
- The Shrek franchise became the first animated film series to gross more than $3 billion with the release of Puss in Boots.
- The Smurfs surpassed Alvin and the Chipmunks: The Squeakquel as the highest-grossing live-action/animated film of all time with $563.7 million.

== Events ==
- 16th Empire Awards
- 17th Screen Actors Guild Awards
- 24th European Film Awards
- 31st Golden Raspberry Awards
- 68th Golden Globe Awards
- 64th British Academy Film Awards
- 68th Venice International Film Festival
- 83rd Academy Awards
- 57th Filmfare Awards
- 2011 MTV Movie Awards
- 2011 Sundance Film Festival

== Awards ==
Category/Organization	17th Critics' Choice Awards January 12, 2012	69th Golden Globe Awards January 15, 2012		Producers, Directors, Screen Actors, and Writers Guild Awards	65th BAFTA Awards February 12, 2012	84th Academy Awards February 26, 2012
Category/Organization	17th Critics' Choice Awards January 12, 2012	Drama	Musical or Comedy	Producers, Directors, Screen Actors, and Writers Guild Awards	65th BAFTA Awards February 12, 2012	84th Academy Awards February 26, 2012
Best Film	The Artist	The Descendants	The Artist			
Best Director	Michel Hazanavicius; The Artist	Martin Scorsese; Hugo		Michel Hazanavicius; The Artist		
Best Actor	George Clooney; The Descendants		Jean Dujardin; The Artist			
Best Actress	Viola Davis; The Help	Meryl Streep; The Iron Lady	Michelle Williams; My Week with Marilyn	Viola Davis; The Help	Meryl Streep; The Iron Lady	
Best Supporting Actor	Christopher Plummer; Beginners					
Best Supporting Actress	Octavia Spencer; The Help					
Best Screenplay, Adapted	Steven Zaillian and Aaron Sorkin; Moneyball	Woody Allen; Midnight in Paris		Alexander Payne, Nat Faxon and Jim Rash; The Descendants	Bridget O'Connor and Peter Straughan; Tinker Tailor Soldier Spy	Alexander Payne, Nat Faxon and Jim Rash; The Descendants
Best Screenplay, Original	Woody Allen; Midnight in Paris	Woody Allen; Midnight in Paris		Woody Allen; Midnight in Paris	Michel Hazanavicius; The Artist	Woody Allen; Midnight in Paris
Best Animated Film	Rango	The Adventures of Tintin			Rango	
Best Original Score	The Artist; Ludovic Bource			—N/a	The Artist; Ludovic Bource	
Best Original Song	"Life's a Happy Song"; The Muppets	"Masterpiece"; W.E.		—N/a	—N/a	"Man or Muppet"; The Muppets
Best Foreign Language Film	A Separation			—N/a	The Skin I Live In	A Separation
Best Documentary	George Harrison: Living in the Material World	—N/a	—N/a	Beats, Rhymes & Life: The Travels of A Tribe Called Quest	Senna	Undefeated

Palme d'Or (64th Cannes Film Festival):

The Tree of Life, directed by Terrence Malick, United States

Golden Lion (68th Venice International Film Festival):

Faust (Фауст), directed by Alexander Sokurov, Russia

Golden Bear (61st Berlin International Film Festival):

A Separation (جدایی نادر از سیمین), directed by Asghar Farhadi, Iran

== 2011 films ==
=== By country/region ===
- List of American films of 2011
- List of Argentine films of 2011
- List of Australian films of 2011
- List of Bangladeshi films of 2011
- List of Brazilian films of 2011
- List of British films of 2011
- List of Canadian films of 2011
- List of Chinese films of 2011
- List of French films of 2011
- List of Hong Kong films of 2011
- List of Italian films of 2011
- List of Indian films of 2011
  - List of Assamese films
  - List of Bengali films of 2011
  - List of Bollywood films of 2011
  - List of Gujarati films
  - List of Kannada films of 2011
  - List of Malayalam films of 2011
  - List of Marathi films of 2011
  - List of Odia films of 2011
  - List of Punjabi films of 2011
  - List of Tamil films of 2011
  - List of Telugu films of 2011
  - List of Tulu films
- List of Japanese films of 2011
- List of Mexican films of the 2010s
- List of Pakistani films of 2011
- List of Russian films of 2011
- List of South Korean films of 2011
- List of Spanish films of 2011
- List of Turkish films of 2011

=== By genre/medium ===
- List of action films of 2011
- List of animated feature films of 2011
- List of avant-garde films of 2011
- List of comedy films of 2011
- List of drama films of 2011
- List of horror films of 2011
- List of science fiction films of 2011
- List of thriller films of 2011
- List of western films of 2011

== Births ==
- February 5 - Luna Fulgencio, Spanish actress
- April 22 - Violet McGraw, American actress
- August 10 - Jeremy Maguire, American actor
- November 2 - Nell Fisher, American actress

== Deaths ==
Month	Date	Name	Age	Country	Profession	Notable films
January	2	Anne Francis	80	US	Actress	Forbidden Planet; Blackboard Jungle
January	2	Pete Postlethwaite	64	UK	Actor	In the Name of the Father; Dragonheart
January	2	Miriam Seegar	103	US	Actress	The Valley of Ghosts; What a Man
January	2	Patricia Smith	80	US	Actress	The Spirit of St. Louis; Mad City
January	2	Margot Stevenson	98	US	Actress	Smashing the Money Ring; Calling Philo Vance
January	3	Jill Haworth	65	UK	Actress	Exodus; In Harm's Way
January	3	Yosef Shiloach	69	Iran	Actor	The Contract; Rambo III
January	9	Peter Yates	81	UK	Director	Bullitt; Breaking Away
January	10	John Dye	47	US	Actor	Campus Man; Best of the Best
January	11	David Nelson	74	US	Actor	The Big Circus; Peyton Place
January	15	Susannah York	72	UK	Actress	Tom Jones; A Man for All Seasons
January	16	Paul Picerni	88	US	Actor	House of Wax; Beyond the Poseidon Adventure
January	16	Juan Piquer Simón	75	Spain	Director	The Pod People; Pieces
January	20	Bruce Gordon	94	US	Actor	Love Happy; Piranha
January	21	Theoni V. Aldredge	82	Greece	Costume Designer	Ghostbusters; The Great Gatsby
January	21	Tony Geiss	86	US	Screenwriter	An American Tail; Follow That Bird
January	24	Bernd Eichinger	61	Germany	Producer, Screenwriter	The NeverEnding Story; Resident Evil
January	26	María Mercader	92	Spain	Actress	Heart and Soul; Giovannino
January	26	Mario Scaccia	91	Italy	Actor	Goodnight, Ladies and Gentlemen; Between Miracles
January	27	Charlie Callas	83	US	Actor	Silent Movie; Pete's Dragon
January	30	John Barry	77	UK	Composer	Out of Africa; Dances with Wolves
January	31	Michael Tolan	86	US	Actor	All That Jazz; The Greatest Story Ever Told
February	2	Margaret John	84	UK	Actress	Run Fatboy Run; How Green Was My Valley
February	3	Maria Schneider	58	France	Actress	Last Tango in Paris; The Passenger
February	4	Fred Hole	75	UK	Art Director	Return of the Jedi; Mission: Impossible
February	4	Tura Satana	72	Japan	Actress	Faster, Pussycat! Kill! Kill!; Irma la Douce
February	5	Donald Peterman	79	US	Cinematographer	Men in Black; Cocoon
February	10	Bill Justice	97	US	Animator	Fantasia; Bambi
February	11	Myrna Dell	86	US	Actress	Rose of the Yukon; Fighting Father Dunne
February	12	Betty Garrett	91	US	Actress, Dancer, Singer	On the Town; My Sister Eileen
February	12	Kenneth Mars	75	US	Actor	The Producers; Young Frankenstein
February	13	Larry Holden	49	US	Actor	Batman Begins; Memento
February	13	T. P. McKenna	81	Ireland	Actor	Ulysses; Straw Dogs
February	14	David F. Friedman	87	US	Producer	Blood Feast; Love Camp 7
February	16	Alfred Burke	92	UK	Actor	Harry Potter and the Chamber of Secrets; Interpol
February	16	Len Lesser	88	US	Actor	Kelly's Heroes; The Outlaw Josey Wales
February	17	Perry Moore	39	US	Producer, Director	The Chronicles of Narnia; Lake City
February	18	Walter Seltzer	96	US	Producer	Soylent Green; The Omega Man
February	20	Raphaël Bretton	91	France	Set Decorator	Hello, Dolly!; The Towering Inferno
February	26	Greg Goossen	65	US	Actor	Unforgiven; The Royal Tenenbaums
February	27	Gary Winick	49	US	Director, Producer	13 Going on 30; Charlotte's Web
February	28	Annie Girardot	79	France	Actress	The Piano Teacher; Dillinger Is Dead
February	28	Nick LaTour	84	US	Actor	Deep Cover; Jingle All the Way
February	28	Jane Russell	89	US	Actress	The Outlaw; Gentlemen Prefer Blondes
March	4	Charles Jarrott	83	UK	Director	Anne of the Thousand Days; Lost Horizon
March	11	Hugh Martin	96	US	Composer	Meet Me in St. Louis; Athena
March	17	Michael Gough	94	UK	Actor	Batman; Horrors of the Black Museum
March	18	Enzo Cannavale	82	Italy	Actor	Cinema Paradiso; The House of Smiles
March	21	Joe Wizan	76	US	Producer	Along Came a Spider; Jeremiah Johnson
March	22	Helen Stenborg	86	US	Actress	Enchanted; The Bonfire of the Vanities
March	23	Elizabeth Taylor	79	UK	Actress	Giant; Who's Afraid of Virginia Woolf?
March	27	Farley Granger	85	US	Actor	Rope; Strangers on a Train
April	2	Bill Varney	77	US	Sound Engineer	Raiders of the Lost Ark; The Empire Strikes Back
April	3	Kevin Jarre	56	US	Screenwriter	Tombstone; Glory
April	4	Wayne Robson	64	Canada	Actor	Affliction; The Incredible Hulk
April	6	Skip O'Brien	60	US	Actor	Liar Liar; Prizzi's Honor
April	9	Sidney Lumet	86	US	Director, Producer, Screenwriter	12 Angry Men; Dog Day Afternoon
April	11	Angela Scoular	65	UK	Actress	On Her Majesty's Secret Service; Casino Royale
April	14	Trevor Bannister	76	UK	Actor	Are You Being Served?; Captain Jack
April	17	Michael Sarrazin	70	Canada	Actor	They Shoot Horses, Don't They?; The Gumball Rally
April	23	Terence Longdon	88	UK	Actor	Ben-Hur; Helen of Troy
April	24	Marie-France Pisier	66	France	Actress	Love at Twenty; Cousin Cousine
April	28	William Campbell	87	US	Actor	The High and the Mighty; Dementia 13
May	3	Jackie Cooper	88	US	Actor, Director	Superman; Skippy
May	4	Mary Murphy	80	US	Actress	The Wild One; The Desperate Hours
May	5	Arthur Laurents	93	US	Screenwriter	Rope; The Turning Point
May	5	Dana Wynter	79	Germany	Actress	Invasion of the Body Snatchers; Airport
May	8	Hilton Rosemarin	58	Canada	Set Decorator	Three Men and a Baby; Jumper
May	9	Dolores Fuller	88	US	Actress	Glen or Glenda; Jail Bait
May	15	Barbara Stuart	76	US	Actress	Airplane!; Bachelor Party
May	16	Edward Hardwicke	78	UK	Actor	Elizabeth; Oliver Twist
May	20	Randy Savage	58	US	Actor	Spider-Man; Bolt
May	21	David J. Hudson	67	US	Sound Engineer	Star Trek IV: The Voyage Home; The Lion King
May	21	Bill Hunter	71	Australia	Actor	Gallipoli; Muriel's Wedding
May	22	Joseph Brooks	73	US	Director, Screenwriter, Songwriter	If Ever I See You Again; You Light Up My Life
May	22	Gimel Everett	60	US	Producer, Screenwriter	The Lawnmower Man; Virtuosity
May	27	Jeff Conaway	60	US	Actor	Grease; The Eagle Has Landed
May	30	Clarice Taylor	93	US	Actress	Play Misty for Me; Sommersby
June	3	James Arness	88	US	Actor	The Farmer's Daughter; Big Jim McLain
June	3	Pat Jackson	95	UK	Director	Shadow on the Wall; Encore!
June	3	Miriam Karlin	85	UK	Actress	A Clockwork Orange; Children of Men
June	6	John Boswall	91	UK	Actor	Nineteen Eighty-Four; Three Men and a Little Lady
June	7	Jorge Semprún	87	Spain	Screenwriter	Z; The War Is Over
June	7	Leonard B. Stern	87	US	Screenwriter, Director	Africa Screams; Just You and Me, Kid
June	8	John Mackenzie	83	UK	Director	The Long Good Friday; Ruby
June	11	Gunnar Fischer	100	Sweden	Cinematographer	Port of Call; Thirst
June	12	Laura Ziskin	61	US	Producer	Pretty Woman; Spider-Man
June	14	Badi Uzzaman	72	India	Actor	Eastern Promises; Another Year
June	18	Clarence Clemons	69	US	Musician, Actor	New York, New York; Bill & Ted's Excellent Adventure
June	19	Joel Simon	60	US	Producer	Hard to Kill; See No Evil
June	20	Ryan Dunn	34	US	Actor	Jackass: The Movie; Blonde Ambition
June	22	David Rayfiel	87	US	Screenwriter	Three Days of the Condor; The Firm
June	23	Peter Falk	83	US	Actor	The Princess Bride; Murder by Death
June	25	Alice Playten	63	US	Actress	Legend; Heavy Metal
June	25	Margaret Tyzack	79	UK	Actress	2001: A Space Odyssey; Match Point
June	26	Edith Fellows	88	US	Actress	Pennies from Heaven; And So They Were Married
June	27	Elaine Stewart	81	US	Actress	The Bad and the Beautiful; Brigadoon
July	1	Leslie Brooks	88	US	Actress	Tonight and Every Night; Blonde Ice
July	3	Anna Massey	73	UK	Actress	Peeping Tom; The Importance of Being Earnest
July	5	Gordon Tootoosis	69	Canada	Actor	Pocahontas; Legends of the Fall
July	8	Roberts Blossom	87	US	Actor	Home Alone; Close Encounters of the Third Kind
July	15	Googie Withers	94	UK	Actress	It Always Rains on Sunday; Shine
July	16	Ante Garmaz	83	Argentina	Actor	Men Only Think of That; El soltero
July	17	David Ngoombujarra	44	Australia	Actor	Crocodile Dundee in Los Angeles; Ned Kelly
July	19	Sheila Burrell	89	UK	Actress	Paranoiac; Cold Comfort Farm
July	22	Tom Aldredge	83	US	Actor	Cold Mountain; Intolerable Cruelty
July	22	Linda Christian	87	Mexico	Actress	Tarzan and the Mermaids; The V.I.P.s
July	24	Tresa Hughes	81	US	Actress	Fame; Don Juan DeMarco
July	24	G. D. Spradlin	90	US	Actor	The Godfather Part II; Apocalypse Now
July	25	Michael Cacoyannis	89	Greece	Director, Producer, Screenwriter	Zorba the Greek; Windfall in Athens
July	26	Silvio Narizzano	84	Canada	Director	Georgy Girl; Loot
July	27	Polly Platt	72	US	Producer, Screenwriter, Production Designer	Pretty Baby; Terms of Endearment
August	2	Richard Pearson	93	UK	Actor	Scrooge; One of Our Dinosaurs Is Missing
August	3	Bubba Smith	66	US	Actor	Police Academy; Black Moon Rising
August	5	Francesco Quinn	48	Italy	Actor	Platoon; Transformers: Dark of the Moon
August	6	John Wood	81	UK	Actor	WarGames; Sabrina
August	14	Shammi Kapoor	79	India	Actor, Director	Junglee; Tumsa Nahin Dekha
August	19	Raúl Ruiz	70	Chile	Director	A Closed Book; The Golden Boat
August	19	Jimmy Sangster	83	UK	Screenwriter	The Curse of Frankenstein; Dracula
August	23	Sybil Jason	83	US	Actress	The Little Princess; The Blue Bird
August	23	Michael Showers	45	US	Actor	Traffic; Mad Money
August	24	Frank DiLeo	63	US	Actor	Goodfellas; Wayne's World
August	24	Jack Hayes	93	US	Composer, Orchestrator	The Color Purple; Star Trek
August	27	Eve Brent	82	US	Actress	The Green Mile; Garfield
September	10	Cliff Robertson	88	US	Actor	Charly; Spider-Man
September	11	Andy Whitfield	39	UK	Actor	Gabriel; The Clinic
September	13	John Calley	81	US	Producer, Executive	Postcards from the Edge; The Da Vinci Code
September	13	Jack Garner	84	US	Actor	My Fellow Americans; Sunset
September	15	Frances Bay	92	Canada	Actress	Happy Gilmore; Blue Velvet
September	16	Norma Eberhardt	82	US	Actress	Live Fast, Die Young; The Return of Dracula
September	19	John Dunning	84	Canada	Producer	My Bloody Valentine; Meatballs
September	21	Paulette Dubost	100	France	Actress	The Rules of the Game; Adrien
September	22	Peter E. Berger	67	US	Film Editor	Fatal Attraction; Alvin and the Chipmunks
September	22	Jonathan Cecil	72	UK	Actor	Barry Lyndon; History of the World, Part I
September	26	David Zelag Goodman	81	US	Screenwriter	Straw Dogs; Logan's Run
September	26	Jerry Haynes	84	US	Actor	RoboCop; Boys Don't Cry
September	27	Fritz Manes	79	US	Producer	Tightrope; Any Which Way You Can
October	2	Peter Przygodda	69	Germany	Film Editor	Paris, Texas; Wings of Desire
October	4	Doris Belack	85	US	Actress	Tootsie; What About Bob?
October	5	Steve Jobs	56	US	Studio Executive	
October	5	Charles Napier	75	US	Actor	The Silence of the Lambs; Rambo: First Blood Part II
October	6	Diane Cilento	78	Australia	Actress	The Wicker Man; Hombre
October	7	George Baker	80	UK	Actor	Goodbye, Mr. Chips; On Her Majesty's Secret Service
October	8	David Hess	75	US	Actor	The Last House on the Left; Swamp Thing
October	10	Ray Aghayan	83	US	Costume Designer	Lady Sings the Blues; Funny Lady
October	10	Alan Fudge	67	US	Actor	Edward Scissorhands; The Natural
October	13	Sheila Allen	78	UK	Actress	Love Actually; Harry Potter and the Goblet of Fire
October	13	Barbara Kent	103	Canada	Actress	Flesh and the Devil; Oliver Twist
October	18	Norman Corwin	101	US	Screenwriter	Lust for Life; The Blue Veil
October	20	Sue Lloyd	72	UK	Actress	The Ipcress File; Revenge of the Pink Panther
October	31	Gilbert Cates	77	US	Director, Producer	Summer Wishes, Winter Dreams; I Never Sang for My Father
November	2	Sid Melton	94	US	Actor	Knock on Any Door; Lost Continent
November	2	Leonard Stone	87	US	Actor	Willy Wonka & the Chocolate Factory; Soylent Green
November	3	Rosángela Balbó	70	Italy	Actress	The Incredible Invasion; The Hypocrites
November	3	Bruno Rubeo	65	Italy	Production Designer	Driving Miss Daisy; The Thomas Crown Affair
November	4	Theadora Van Runkle	83	US	Costume Designer	Bonnie and Clyde; The Godfather Part II
November	6	Margaret Field	89	US	Actress	The Man from Planet X; Captive Women
November	6	Hal Kanter	92	US	Screenwriter, Director	Artists and Models; Blue Hawaii
November	8	Gene Cantamessa	80	US	Sound Engineer	E.T. the Extra-Terrestrial; Space Jam
November	8	Heavy D	44	US	Rapper, Actor	The Cider House Rules; Step Up
November	15	Dulcie Gray	95	UK	Actress	The Glass Mountain; Wanted for Murder
November	15	Karl Slover	93	US	Actor	The Wizard of Oz; The Terror of Tiny Town
November	16	Maureen Swanson	78	UK	Actress	Knights of the Round Table; Up in the World
November	19	Russell Garcia	95	US	Composer	The Time Machine; Atlantis, the Lost Continent
November	19	John Neville	86	UK	Actor	The Adventures of Baron Munchausen; The X-Files
November	20	Dorothy Morris	89	US	Actress	Cry "Havoc"; The Human Comedy
November	21	Syd Cain	93	UK	Production Designer	Live and Let Die; Fahrenheit 451
November	27	Ken Russell	84	UK	Director, Screenwriter	Tommy; Women in Love
November	28	Vittorio De Seta	88	Italy	Director, Screenwriter	Bandits of Orgosolo; Half a Man
November	28	Patrice O'Neal	41	US	Comedian, Actor	25th Hour; Furry Vengeance
December	1	Bill McKinney	80	US	Actor	Deliverance; First Blood
December	3	Dev Anand	88	India	Actor, Director, Producer	Guide; Hare Rama Hare Krishna
December	4	Marion Dougherty	88	US	Casting Director	Lethal Weapon; Batman
December	6	Giancarlo Badessi	83	Italy	Actor	Salon Kitty; Swindle
December	7	Harry Morgan	96	US	Actor	Inherit the Wind; Dragnet
December	8	Đơn Dương	54	Vietnam	Actor	We Were Soldiers; Green Dragon
December	11	Harold Hopkins	67	Australia	Actor	Don's Party; Gallipoli
December	12	Bert Schneider	78	US	Producer	Easy Rider; The Last Picture Show
December	14	Don Sharp	67	Australia	Director	The Thirty Nine Steps; Psychomania
December	16	Robert Easton	81	US	Actor, Dialogue Coach	Working Girl; Gods and Generals
December	16	Nicol Williamson	73	UK	Actor	The Wilby Conspiracy; The Seven-Per-Cent Solution
December	18	Doe Avedon	86	US	Actress	The High and the Mighty; The Boss
December	20	Yoshimitsu Morita	61	Japan	Director	The Family Game; Sorekara
December	22	William Duell	88	US	Actor	One Flew Over the Cuckoo's Nest; In & Out
December	23	Denise Darcel	87	US	Actress	Vera Cruz; Westward the Women
December	26	Pedro Armendáriz, Jr.	71	Mexico	Actor	Licence to Kill; Amistad
December	27	Betty Jane Rhodes	90	US	Actress, Singer	Sweater Girl; The Fleet's In

== Film debuts ==
- Christopher Abbott – Martha Marcy May Marlene
- Odessa A'zion – Conception
- Ser'Darius Blain – Footloose
- Luke Bracey – Monte Carlo
- Yura Borisov – Elena
- John Boyega – Attack the Block
- Sam Claflin – Pirates of the Caribbean: On Stranger Tides
- John Dagleish – Age of Heroes
- Chino Darín – Offside
- Elizabeth Debicki – A Few Best Men
- Zoey Deutch – Mayor Cupcake
- Kaitlyn Dever – Bad Teacher
- Michelle Dockery – Hanna
- Adam Driver – J. Edgar
- Victoire Du Bois – Calm at Sea
- Taissa Farmiga – Higher Ground
- Claire Foy – Season of the Witch
- Michael Gandolfini – Down the Shore
- Julia Garner – Martha Marcy May Marlene
- Mariela Garriga – Wedding in Paris
- Anna Hutchison – The Cabin in the Woods
- Jeremy Irvine – War Horse
- Lorenza Izzo – Qué pena tu boda
- Sam Keeley – The Other Side of Sleep
- Jack Kesy – Yelling to the Sky
- Barry Keoghan – Between the Canals
- Eva Llorach – Diamond Flash
- Mike Manning - The Brothers Sinclair
- Jason Mitchell – Texas Killing Fields
- Sophie Nélisse – Monsieur Lazhar
- Kathryn Newton – Bad Teacher
- Dylan O'Brien – High Road
- Elizabeth Olsen – Martha Marcy May Marlene
- Katy Perry - The Smurfs
- Daniella Pineda – Newlyweds
- Renate Reinsve – Oslo, August 31st
- Iwan Rheon – Resistance
- Alexandra Roach – The Iron Lady
- Ronen Rubinstein – Detachment
- Tye Sheridan – The Tree of Life
- Jenny Slate – Alvin and the Chipmunks: Chipwrecked
- Amandla Stenberg – Colombiana
- Alfie Stewart – The Great Ghost Rescue
- Austin Stowell – Puncture
- Adam David Thompson – Martha Marcy May Marlene
- Marine Vacth – My Piece of the Pie
- Anamaria Vartolomei – My Little Princess
- Tashiana Washington – Gun Hill Road
- Letitia Wright – Victim
