= 2012 in film =

2012 in film is an overview of events, including the highest-grossing films, award ceremonies, critics' lists of the best films of 2012, festivals, a list of country-specific lists of films released, and notable deaths. Most notably, Universal and Paramount, the two of America's oldest surviving film studios, celebrated their centennial anniversaries, marking the first time that two major film studios celebrate 100 years. The Dolby Atmos sound format was launched for the premiere of Brave. The James Bond film series celebrated its 50th anniversary and released its 23rd film, Skyfall. Six box-office blockbusters from previous years (Beauty and the Beast, Monsters, Inc., Star Wars: Episode I – The Phantom Menace, Titanic, Raiders of the Lost Ark, and Finding Nemo) were re-released in 3D and IMAX. Also, the year marked the debut for high frame rate technology. The first film using 48 F.P.S., a higher frame rate than the film industry standard 24 F.P.S., was The Hobbit: An Unexpected Journey.

== Evaluation of the year ==
Richard Brody of The New Yorker said,

2012 has been a good year for Hollywood and off-Hollywood. Note, once more, the remarkable Hollywood nexus of the Gotham and Independent Spirit nominees, as the path of independent financing becomes ever more significant for filmmakers whose work doesn't fit into franchise formatting. And that's a good thing, from the perspective of filmmaking—whether it means that directors and actors share producers' risks in getting their work made, or that complicit producers give a director's vision free rein. But the latter notion makes some critics uneasy. There's an undercurrent of thought—one rooted in an antiquated and nostalgic vision of a halcyon classic Hollywood that supposedly both reached the masses and made modest and un-self-conscious art—that looks to producers to restrain the idiosyncrasies of directors and fit them into a readily marketable package of popular appeal. These critics yearn for the adversarial relationship of producer and director, seeing the producer as the supporter of democratic values and the director as a sort of egomaniacal élitist who, unrestrained, would spend someone else's money frivolously to make a movie that would please himself and his friends. Of course, that relationship becomes adversarial only if the producer doesn't see himself as a sort of benefactor, a patron of the arts whose very role is to finance and to foster individual expression—and, as ever, it all depends on who the individual is and what the nature of the vision is. It's fairly obvious that strong producers improve films made by mediocre directors but often constrain or dilute the distinctiveness and individuality of the work of good ones. There is a political agenda hidden within the critics' aesthetic preference for the strong hand of the producer, as critics demagogically put themselves in the position of defenders of the people—defending them from radical outliers and finding popular tastes with which to align themselves. It's another case of left and right agreeing without common ground and leading to bad policy—and, in this case, bad art.

In August 2012, BFI announced their 2012 Sight & Sound Greatest films of all Time survey which was topped for the first time by Vertigo.

== Highest-grossing films ==
The top 10 films released in 2012 by worldwide gross are as follows:

Highest-grossing films of 2012
Rank	Title	Distributor	Worldwide gross
1	The Avengers	Disney	$1,518,812,988
2	Skyfall	Sony / MGM	$1,108,561,013
3	The Dark Knight Rises	Warner Bros.	$1,081,041,287
4	The Hobbit: An Unexpected Journey	Warner Bros. / MGM	$1,017,003,568
5	Ice Age: Continental Drift	20th Century Fox	$877,244,782
6	The Twilight Saga: Breaking Dawn – Part 2	Lionsgate	$829,746,820
7	The Amazing Spider-Man	Sony	$757,930,663
8	Madagascar 3: Europe's Most Wanted	Paramount	$746,921,274
9	The Hunger Games	Lionsgate	$694,394,724
10	Men in Black 3	Sony	$654,213,485

The Avengers grossed over $1.5 billion and it became the third highest-grossing film of all time. Skyfall, The Dark Knight Rises, and The Hobbit: An Unexpected Journey have each grossed over $1 billion, making them among the highest-grossing films of all time.

=== 2012 box office records ===
- The Hunger Games was the first film of 2012 to pass the $500 million mark worldwide, and is also the first film since Avatar to place first at the U.S. box office for four consecutive weekends.
- Skyfall became the first film to gross more than £100 million, amassing a total of £102.9 million.
- With their 3-D re-releases, two films achieved new milestones: Star Wars: Episode I – The Phantom Menace reached $1.027 billion, and Titanic reached $2.187 billion, becoming the second film to surpass the $2 billion mark, following Avatar.
- 2012 was the first year to have four films cross the billion-dollar milestone, surpassing the previous year's record of three billion-dollar films.
- Men in Black 3 became the highest-grossing non-superhero comic adaptation of all time, surpassing Men in Black.

== Events ==
- 1st AACTA International Awards
- 14th Jutra Awards
- 18th Screen Actors Guild Awards
- 32nd Genie Awards
- 32nd Golden Raspberry Awards
- 38th People's Choice Awards
- 38th Saturn Awards
- 62nd Berlin International Film Festival
- 65th British Academy Film Awards
- 69th Golden Globe Awards
- 69th Venice International Film Festival
- 84th Academy Awards
- 2012 Cannes Film Festival
- 2012 MTV Movie Awards
- 2012 Toronto International Film Festival

== Awards ==
Category/Organization	18th Critics' Choice Awards January 10, 2013	70th Golden Globe Awards January 13, 2013		Producers, Directors, Screen Actors, and Writers Guild Awards	66th BAFTA Awards February 10, 2013	85th Academy Awards February 24, 2013
Category/Organization	18th Critics' Choice Awards January 10, 2013	Drama	Musical or Comedy	Producers, Directors, Screen Actors, and Writers Guild Awards	66th BAFTA Awards February 10, 2013	85th Academy Awards February 24, 2013
Best Film	Argo		Les Misérables	Argo		
Best Director	Ben Affleck; Argo					Ang Lee; Life of Pi
Best Actor	Daniel Day-Lewis; Lincoln		Hugh Jackman; Les Misérables	Daniel Day-Lewis; Lincoln		
Best Actress	Jessica Chastain; Zero Dark Thirty		Jennifer Lawrence; Silver Linings Playbook		Emmanuelle Riva; Amour	Jennifer Lawrence; Silver Linings Playbook
Best Supporting Actor	Philip Seymour Hoffman; The Master	Christoph Waltz; Django Unchained		Tommy Lee Jones; Lincoln	Christoph Waltz; Django Unchained	
Best Supporting Actress	Anne Hathaway; Les Misérables					
Best Screenplay, Adapted	Tony Kushner; Lincoln	Quentin Tarantino; Django Unchained		Chris Terrio; Argo	David O. Russell; Silver Linings Playbook	Chris Terrio; Argo
Best Screenplay, Original	Quentin Tarantino; Django Unchained	Quentin Tarantino; Django Unchained		Mark Boal; Zero Dark Thirty	Quentin Tarantino; Django Unchained	
Best Animated Film	Wreck-It Ralph	Brave		Wreck-It Ralph	Brave	
Best Original Score	Lincoln; John Williams	Life of Pi; Mychael Danna		—N/a	Skyfall; Thomas Newman	Life of Pi; Mychael Danna
Best Original Song	"Skyfall"; Skyfall			—N/a	—N/a	"Skyfall"; Skyfall
Best Foreign Language Film	Amour			—N/a	Amour	
Best Documentary	Searching for Sugar Man	—N/a	—N/a	Searching for Sugar Man		

Palme d'Or (65th Cannes Film Festival):

Amour, directed by Michael Haneke, Germany

Golden Lion (69th Venice International Film Festival):

Pietà (피에타), directed by Kim Ki-duk, South Korea

Golden Bear (62nd Berlin International Film Festival):

Caesar Must Die (Cesare deve morire), directed by Paolo Taviani, Vittorio Taviani, Italy

== 2012 films ==
=== By country/region ===
- List of American films of 2012
- List of Argentine films of 2012
- List of Australian films of 2012
- List of Bangladeshi films of 2012
- List of Brazilian films of 2012
- List of British films of 2012
- List of Canadian films of 2012
- List of Chinese films of 2012
- List of French films of 2012
- List of Hong Kong films of 2012
- List of Italian films of 2012
- List of Indian films of 2012
  - List of Assamese films
  - List of Bengali films of 2012
  - List of Bollywood films of 2012
  - List of Gujarati films
  - List of Kannada films of 2012
  - List of Malayalam films of 2012
  - List of Marathi films of 2012
  - List of Odia films of 2012
  - List of Punjabi films of 2012
  - List of Tamil films of 2012
  - List of Telugu films of 2012
  - List of Tulu films
- List of Japanese films of 2012
- List of Mexican films of the 2010s
- List of Pakistani films of 2012
- List of Russian films of 2012
- List of South Korean films of 2012
- List of Spanish films of 2012
- List of Turkish films of 2012

=== By genre/medium ===
- List of action films of 2012
- List of animated feature films of 2012
- List of avant-garde films of 2012
- List of comedy films of 2012
- List of drama films of 2012
- List of horror films of 2012
- List of science fiction films of 2012
- List of thriller films of 2012
- List of western films of 2012

== Births ==
- January 7 - Blue Ivy Carter, American voice actress and dancer
- March 6 - Mykal-Michelle Harris, American actress
- April 23 - Alan Kim, American actor
- June 4 - Vivien Lyra Blair, American actress

== Deaths ==
Month	Date	Name	Age	Country	Profession	Notable films
January	1	Bob Anderson	89	UK	Stuntman, Choreographer	Star Wars; The Lord of the Rings
January	2	Silvana Gallardo	58	US	Actress	Windwalker; Death Wish II
January	3	Joaquín Martínez	81	Mexico	Actor	Jeremiah Johnson; House of Cards
January	4	Harry Fowler	85	UK	Actor	Went the Day Well?; Hue and Cry
January	5	Frederica Sagor Maas	111	US	Screenwriter	The Plastic Age; Dance Madness
January	10	Lila Kaye	82	UK	Actress	An American Werewolf in London; Nuns on the Run
January	11	Richard Bruno	87	US	Costume Designer	The Karate Kid; Chinatown
January	11	David Whitaker	81	UK	Composer	Hammerhead; Run Wild, Run Free
January	13	Morgan Jones	83	US	Actor	Not of This Earth; Apache Woman
January	14	Mila Parely	94	France	Actress	The Rules of the Game; Beauty and the Beast
January	21	Eiko Ishioka	73	Japan	Costume Designer	Bram Stoker's Dracula; The Cell
January	23	Bingham Ray	57	US	Studio Executive	
January	24	Theo Angelopoulos	76	Greece	Director, Screenwriter	Eternity and a Day; Ulysses' Gaze
January	24	James Farentino	82	US	Actor	The Final Countdown; Bulletproof
January	26	Ian Abercrombie	77	UK	Actor	Army of Darkness; The Lost World: Jurassic Park
January	26	Dimitra Arliss	79	US	Actress	The Sting; The Other Side of Midnight
January	29	John Rich	86	US	Director	Boeing Boeing; Wives and Lovers
February	3	Ben Gazzara	81	US	Actor	Anatomy of a Murder; Road House
February	3	Zalman King	69	US	Director, Screenwriter, Actor	9½ Weeks; Two Moon Junction
February	4	Andrew Wight	51	Australia	Screenwriter, Producer	Sanctum; Aliens of the Deep
February	5	Sam Coppola	79	US	Actor	Serpico; Saturday Night Fever
February	6	Peter Breck	82	US	Actor	Shock Corridor; Benji
February	8	Phil Bruns	80	US	Actor	Flashdance; Harry and Tonto
February	8	Laurie Main	89	Australia	Actor	Freaky Friday; Time After Time
February	11	Whitney Houston	48	US	Singer, Actress, Producer	The Bodyguard; Waiting to Exhale
February	12	Zina Bethune	66	US	Actress	Sunrise at Campobello; Who's That Knocking at My Door
February	12	David Kelly	82	Ireland	Actor	Waking Ned; Charlie and the Chocolate Factory
February	13	Russell Arms	92	US	Actor, Singer	The Man Who Came to Dinner; Captains of the Clouds
February	14	Dory Previn	86	US	Lyricist	Valley of the Dolls; The Sterile Cuckoo
February	16	Elyse Knox	94	US	Actress	The Mummy's Tomb; Joe Palooka
February	16	Dick Anthony Williams	77	US	Actor	Dog Day Afternoon; Edward Scissorhands
February	18	Peter Halliday	87	UK	Actor	The Swordsman; The Remains of the Day
February	18	Ric Waite	78	US	Cinematographer	Red Dawn; Footloose
February	23	Bruce Surtees	74	US	Cinematographer	Dirty Harry; Beverly Hills Cop
February	25	Erland Josephson	88	Sweden	Actor	Fanny and Alexander; The Sacrifice
February	26	Richard Carpenter	82	UK	Actor	The Terrornauts; Mystery Submarine
February	29	Davy Jones	66	UK	Actor, Singer	Head; The Brady Bunch Movie
March	1	Phillip R. Allen	72	US	Actor	Mommie Dearest; Star Trek III: The Search for Spock
March	1	Jerome Courtland	85	US	Actor, Producer	The Man from Colorado; Battleground
March	3	Leonardo Cimino	94	US	Actor	Dune; Moonstruck
March	3	Ralph McQuarrie	82	US	Designer, Illustrator	Star Wars; Raiders of the Lost Ark
March	4	Joan Taylor	82	US	Actress	20 Million Miles to Earth; War Paint
March	5	Philip Madoc	77	UK	Actor	Dr. Jekyll and Sister Hyde; Hell Boats
March	6	Robert B. Sherman	86	US	Songwriter	Mary Poppins; The Aristocats
March	9	Terry Teene	70	US	Actor, Singer	Raging Bull; Die Laughing
March	10	Jean Giraud	73	France	Designer, Illustrator	Alien; Tron
March	11	Faith Brook	90	UK	Actress	To Sir, with Love; Eye of the Needle
March	19	Ulu Grosbard	83	Belgium	Director, Producer	The Subject Was Roses; Falling in Love
March	21	Robert Fuest	84	UK	Director, Screenwriter	Just Like a Woman; Wuthering Heights
March	21	Tonino Guerra	92	Italy	Screenwriter	Blowup; Amarcord
March	25	Hal E. Chester	91	US	Producer, Screenwriter, Actor	The Beast from 20,000 Fathoms; Night of the Demon
March	25	Bill Weston	70	UK	Stuntman, Actor	Batman; Titanic
March	27	Warren Stevens	92	US	Actor	Forbidden Planet; The Barefoot Contessa
March	28	Neil Travis	73	US	Film Editor	Dances with Wolves; Patriot Games
March	29	Luke Askew	80	US	Actor	Easy Rider; Cool Hand Luke
April	1	Jamaa Fanaka	69	US	Director, Screenwriter	Penitentiary; Welcome Home Brother Charles
April	9	Carol Adams	94	US	Actress	Sis Hopkins; Ridin' on a Rainbow
April	9	Barry Cahill	90	Canada	Actor	Grand Theft Auto; Sweet Bird of Youth
April	10	Grant Tilly	74	Australia	Actor	30 Days of Night; Nate and Hayes
April	11	Rainer Penkert	90	Germany	Actor	Morituri; Paper Tiger
April	14	William Finley	71	US	Actor	Phantom of the Paradise; The Black Dahlia
April	14	Jonathan Frid	87	Canada	Actor	House of Dark Shadows; Seizure
April	14	Martin Poll	89	US	Producer	Nighthawks; The Lion in Winter
April	15	Paul Bogart	92	US	Director	Marlowe; Torch Song Trilogy
April	15	Murray Rose	73	Australia	Actor	Ice Station Zebra; Ride the Wild Surf
April	17	Ron Karabatsos	78	US	Actor	Flashdance; Get Shorty
April	18	Dick Clark	82	US	Actor, Producer	The Young Doctors; Because They're Young
April	18	Robert O. Ragland	80	US	Composer	Abby; Project Kill
April	19	Levon Helm	71	US	Actor, Singer	Coal Miner's Daughter; The Right Stuff
April	20	Peter Carsten	83	Germany	Actor	The Quiller Memorandum; The Vengeance of Fu Manchu
April	25	Paul L. Smith	75	US	Actor	Popeye; Red Sonja
April	28	Patricia Medina	92	UK	Actress	Mr. Arkadin; Phantom of the Rue Morgue
April	29	Joel Goldsmith	54	US	Composer	The Man with Two Brains; Kull the Conqueror
April	30	George Murdock	81	US	Actor	The X-Files; The American President
May	2	Tracy Reed	69	UK	Actress	Dr. Strangelove; A Shot in the Dark
May	4	Mort Lindsey	89	US	Composer	I Could Go On Singing; Real Life
May	6	James Isaac	51	US	Director, Special Effects Artist	Jason X; Skinwalkers
May	6	George Lindsey	83	US	Actor	Ensign Pulver; The Aristocats
May	7	Andrea Crisanti	75	Italy	Production Designer	Cinema Paradiso; The Emperor's New Clothes
May	7	Virgil Frye	81	US	Actor	Bobbie Jo and the Outlaw; Revenge of the Ninja
May	9	Vidal Sassoon	84	UK	Hairstylist	Rosemary's Baby; Be My Guest
May	10	Joyce Redman	93	UK	Actress	Othello; Tom Jones
May	11	Roland Shaw	91	UK	Composer, Arranger	The Secret of My Success; Straight On till Morning
May	15	Henry Denker	99	US	Screenwriter	Time Limit; The Hook
May	22	Janet Carroll	71	US	Actress	Risky Business; Forces of Nature
May	24	Lee Rich	93	US	Producer	Passenger 57; The Score
May	27	Dee Caruso	83	US	Screenwriter	Which Way to the Front?; The World's Greatest Athlete
May	28	Matthew Yuricich	89	US	Special Effects Artist	Logan's Run; Close Encounters of the Third Kind
May	29	Kaneto Shindo	100	Japan	Screenwriter, Director	Onibaba; Postcard
May	31	Christopher Challis	91	UK	Cinematographer	Chitty Chitty Bang Bang; The Deep
June	2	Richard Dawson	79	UK	Actor	The Running Man; King Rat
June	2	Kathryn Joosten	72	US	Actress	Wedding Crashers; Bedtime Stories
June	2	Marco Onorato	59	Italy	Cinematographer	Gomorrah; Reality
June	3	Jean-Louis Richard	85	France	Screenwriter	Day for Night; Fahrenheit 451
June	4	Stan Jolley	86	US	Production Designer	Witness; Caddyshack
June	5	Caroline John	71	UK	Actress	The Razor's Edge; Love Actually
June	5	Ray Bradbury	90	US	Screenwriter	Moby Dick; Something Wicked This Way Comes
June	7	J. Michael Riva	63	US	Production Designer	Lethal Weapon; A Few Good Men
June	8	Frank Cady	96	US	Actor	Rear Window; When Worlds Collide
June	10	Judy Freudberg	62	US	Screenwriter	An American Tail; Follow That Bird
June	11	Ann Rutherford	94	Canada	Actress	Gone with the Wind; A Christmas Carol
June	14	Yvette Wilson	48	US	Actress	Friday; Poetic Justice
June	16	Giuseppe Bertolucci	65	Italy	Director, Screenwriter	Berlinguer, I Love You; 1900
June	16	Susan Tyrrell	67	US	Actress	Cry-Baby; Fat City
June	18	Victor Spinetti	82	UK	Actor	A Hard Day's Night; The Taming of the Shrew
June	19	Richard Lynch	72	US	Actor	Halloween; Invasion U.S.A.
June	26	Nora Ephron	71	US	Director, Screenwriter, Producer	Sleepless in Seattle; When Harry Met Sally...
June	26	Charles Rosen	81	US	Production Designer	Broadcast News; Invasion of the Body Snatchers
June	27	Bruce Guerin	93	US	Actor	Revelation; The Salvation Hunters
June	28	Paul Stassino	81	Greece	Actor	Thunderball; Exodus
July	2	Ben Davidson	72	US	Actor	Conan the Barbarian; Necessary Roughness
July	2	Ben Van Os	67	Netherlands	Production Designer	Girl with a Pearl Earring; Orlando
July	3	Andy Griffith	86	US	Actor	A Face in the Crowd; No Time for Sergeants
July	4	Eric Sykes	89	UK	Actor	Harry Potter and the Goblet of Fire; The Others
July	8	Ernest Borgnine	95	US	Actor	Marty; The Poseidon Adventure
July	13	Sage Stallone	36	US	Actor	Rocky V; Daylight
July	13	Ginny Tyler	86	US	Voice Actress	Son of Flubber; The Sword in the Stone
July	13	Richard D. Zanuck	77	US	Producer	Jaws; Driving Miss Daisy
July	15	Celeste Holm	95	US	Actress	All About Eve; Gentleman's Agreement
July	16	William Asher	90	US	Director, Screenwriter	Muscle Beach Party; Beach Blanket Bingo
July	17	Morgan Paull	67	US	Actor	Blade Runner; Patton
July	18	Rajesh Khanna	69	India	Actor	Anand; Amar Prem
July	19	Tom Davis	59	US	Actor, Screenwriter	Coneheads; Trading Places
July	20	Tony Epper	73	US	Stuntman, Actor	Dick Tracy; Nowhere to Run
July	20	Simon Ward	70	UK	Actor	The Three Musketeers; Young Winston
July	21	Angharad Rees	63	UK	Actress	Hands of the Ripper; To Catch a Spy
July	22	Fern Persons	101	US	Actress	Hoosiers; Class
July	22	Frank Pierson	87	US	Screenwriter, Director	A Star Is Born; Dog Day Afternoon
July	24	Chad Everett	76	US	Actor	Made in Paris; Airplane II: The Sequel
July	24	Sherman Hemsley	74	US	Actor	Love at First Bite; Mr. Nanny
July	26	Walter Goss	84	New Zealand	Sound Engineer	Deliverance; In the Heat of the Night
July	26	Lupe Ontiveros	69	US	Actress	The Goonies; Selena
July	26	Mary Tamm	62	UK	Actress	The Odessa File; The Likely Lads
July	27	Norman Alden	87	US	Actor	Back to the Future; Tora! Tora! Tora!
July	27	R. G. Armstrong	95	US	Actor	Predator; Ride the High Country
July	27	Geoffrey Hughes	68	UK	Actor	The Bofors Gun; Yellow Submarine
July	27	Tony Martin	98	US	Actor, Singer	Hit the Deck; The Big Store
July	29	John P. Finnegan	86	US	Actor	JFK; The Natural
July	29	Chris Marker	91	France	Director	Sans Soleil; La Jetée
July	30	Jonathan Hardy	71	New Zealand	Actor, Director	Mad Max; Moulin Rouge!
July	31	Gore Vidal	86	US	Actor, Screenwriter	The Best Man; Gattaca
August	6	Marvin Hamlisch	68	US	Composer	The Way We Were; Sophie's Choice
August	8	Sancho Gracia	75	Spain	Actor	Antony and Cleopatra; The Call of the Wild
August	9	Al Freeman Jr.	78	US	Actor	Finian's Rainbow; Malcolm X
August	9	Mel Stuart	83	US	Director, Producer	Willy Wonka & the Chocolate Factory; Four Days in November
August	10	Irving Fein	101	US	Producer	18 Again!; Oh, God! You Devil
August	10	Carlo Rambaldi	86	Italy	Special Effects Artist	E.T. the Extra-Terrestrial; King Kong
August	13	Joan Roberts	94	US	Actress	The Model and the Marriage Broker; Lovely to Look At
August	14	Ron Palillo	63	US	Actor	Skatetown, U.S.A.; Friday the 13th Part VI: Jason Lives
August	14	Phyllis Thaxter	92	US	Actress	Superman; Thirty Seconds Over Tokyo
August	15	Biff Elliot	89	US	Actor	I, the Jury; House of Bamboo
August	16	William Windom	88	US	Actor	To Kill a Mockingbird; The Detective
August	18	George Bowers	68	US	Film Editor, Director	A League of Their Own; Roll Bounce
August	19	Tony Scott	68	UK	Director, Producer	Top Gun; Unstoppable
August	20	Phyllis Diller	95	US	Actress, Comedian	Boy, Did I Get a Wrong Number!; A Bug's Life
August	23	Jerry Nelson	78	US	Puppeteer	The Muppet Movie; The Dark Crystal
August	24	Steve Franken	80	US	Actor	The Party; The Missouri Breaks
August	31	Max Bygraves	89	UK	Actor, Singer	Tom Brown's Schooldays; Charley Moon
September	1	Hal David	91	US	Lyricist	Butch Cassidy and the Sundance Kid; What's New Pussycat?
September	3	Michael Clarke Duncan	54	US	Actor	The Green Mile; Planet of the Apes
September	6	Jake Eberts	71	Canada	Producer	The Way Back; Driving Miss Daisy
September	6	Frank Godwin	95	UK	Producer	Woman in a Dressing Gown; Operation Bullshine
September	8	Leigh Hamilton	62	New Zealand	Actress	Hocus Pocus; Forced Vengeance
September	10	Vondell Darr	93	US	Actress	The City That Never Sleeps; The Pony Express
September	10	Lance LeGault	75	US	Actor	Stripes; Mortal Kombat Annihilation
September	10	Stanley Long	78	UK	Director, Screenwriter, Producer	The Wife Swappers; Adventures of a Taxi Driver
September	10	John Moffatt	89	UK	Actor	The Silent Enemy; Tom Jones
September	13	Edgar Metcalfe	78	UK	Actor	Evil Angels; Percy's Progress
September	14	Stephen Dunham	48	US	Actor	The Mummy; Paranormal Activity 4
September	14	Winston Rekert	63	Canada	Actor	Agnes of God; The Blue Man
September	16	John Ingle	84	US	Actor	Heathers; Senseless
September	16	Roman Kroitor	85	Canada	Director, Producer	In the Labyrinth; City of Gold
September	24	Edward A. Biery	92	US	Film Editor	When Time Ran Out; Rollercoaster
September	25	Andy Williams	84	US	Actor, Singer	I'd Rather Be Rich; Something in the Wind
September	26	Johnny Lewis	28	US	Actor	The Runaways; Aliens vs. Predator: Requiem
September	27	Herbert Lom	95	Czech Republic	Actor	The Pink Panther; The Phantom of the Opera
September	28	Michael O'Hare	60	US	Actor	Last Exit to Brooklyn; C.H.U.D.
September	30	Turhan Bey	90	Austria	Actor	Shadows on the Stairs; The Mummy's Tomb
September	30	Stephen Frankfurt	80	US	Title Designer	To Kill a Mockingbird; Goodbye, Columbus
October	2	Marjorie Lane	100	US	Actress, Singer	Born to Dance; Broadway Melody of 1936
October	7	Larry Block	69	US	Actor	Shamus; Slap Shot
October	7	Hank Moonjean	82	US	Producer	Dangerous Liaisons; Sharky's Machine
October	8	Ken Sansom	85	US	Actor	The Sting; The Tigger Movie
October	9	Harris Savides	55	US	Cinematographer	Gerry; Zodiac
October	10	Alex Karras	77	US	Actor	Blazing Saddles; Victor/Victoria
October	10	Leo O'Brien	41	US	Actor	The Last Dragon; Rappin'
October	12	Norm Grabowski	79	US	Actor	The Cannonball Run; Hooper
October	13	Gary Collins	74	US	Actor	Hangar 18; Airport
October	14	John Clive	79	UK	Actor	A Clockwork Orange; Yellow Submarine
October	18	Sylvia Kristel	60	Netherlands	Actress	Emmanuelle; Private School
October	20	Joe Melia	77	UK	Actor	Modesty Blaise; Oh! What a Lovely War
October	21	Yash Chopra	80	India	Director, Producer	Deewaar; Dil To Pagal Hai
October	22	Russell Means	72	US	Actor	The Last of the Mohicans; Pocahontas
October	24	Peggy Ahern	95	US	Actress	Our Gang; Excuse Me
October	24	Anita Bjork	89	Sweden	Actress	Miss Julie; Night People
October	26	Mac Ahlberg	81	Sweden	Cinematographer	Beverly Hills Cop III; Re-Animator
October	26	Natina Reed	32	US	Actress, Singer	Bring It On; Honey
October	27	Robert W. Castle	81	US	Actor	Philadelphia; Rachel Getting Married
October	28	Merry Anders	78	US	Actress	The Dalton Girls; The Time Travelers
October	28	Bob Brunner	78	US	Screenwriter	The Other Sister; Exit to Eden
October	29	Bounty	52	Canada	Ship, Film Prop	Mutiny on the Bounty; Yellowbeard
October	30	Leonard Termo	77	US	Actor	Fight Club; Year of the Dragon
November	5	Olympe Bradna	93	France	Actress	Souls at Sea; The Night of Nights
November	6	Clive Dunn	92	UK	Actor	Dad's Army; The Magic Christian
November	7	Richard Robbins	71	US	Composer	Howards End; The Remains of the Day
November	8	Lucille Bliss	96	US	Voice Actress	Cinderella; The Secret of NIMH
November	8	Roger Hammond	76	UK	Actor	The King's Speech; Richard III
November	17	Katherine Kath	92	UK	Actress	Anastasia; Moulin Rouge
November	21	Dann Cahn	89	US	Film Editor	The Octagon; Beyond the Valley of the Dolls
November	21	Deborah Raffin	59	US	Actress	Once Is Not Enough; Death Wish 3
November	23	Larry Hagman	81	US	Actor, Director	Fail Safe; Nixon
November	23	John Kemeny	87	Canada	Producer	Quest for Fire; Atlantic City
November	25	Dinah Sheridan	92	UK	Actress	Genevieve; The Railway Children
November	26	Martin Richards	80	US	Producer	Chicago; Fort Apache, The Bronx
November	27	Bob Kellett	84	UK	Director, Producer, Screenwriter	Are You Being Served?; Up Pompeii
November	28	Don Rhymer	51	US	Screenwriter	Rio; Big Momma's House
November	29	Susan Luckey	74	US	Actress	The Music Man; Carousel
November	29	Benjamin Tatar	82	US	Actor	The Wind and the Lion; Battle of the Bulge
December	3	Eileen Moran	60	US	Visual Effects Artist	The Lord of the Rings; Rise of the Planet of the Apes
December	4	Rozina Cambos	60	Romania	Actress	Mivtza Savta; The Human Resources Manager
December	7	Jeni Le Gon	96	US	Actress, Dancer	Sundown; Bright Road
December	8	Hal Schaefer	87	US	Composer	The Money Trap; There's No Business Like Show Business
December	10	Marla English	77	US	Actress	Voodoo Woman; The She-Creature
December	10	Ed Grady	89	US	Actor	The Notebook; Lolita
December	10	Patricia Kennedy	96	Australia	Actress	The Getting of Wisdom; My Brilliant Career
December	11	Ravi Shankar	92	India	Composer	Gandhi; Charly
December	12	Don Medford	95	US	Director	The Hunting Party; The Organization
December	13	Gil Friesen	75	US	Producer	The Breakfast Club; 20 Feet from Stardom
December	16	Avraham Mor	77	Israel	Actor	Alex Holeh Ahavah; Laura Adler's Last Love Affair
December	18	Danny Steinmann	70	US	Director, Screenwriter	Friday the 13th: A New Beginning; Savage Streets
December	19	Bud Alper	82	US	Sound Engineer	Rocky; Blade Runner
December	22	Cliff Osmond	75	US	Actor	The Fortune Cookie; Kiss Me, Stupid
December	23	Ha Nguyen	57	Vietnam	Costume Designer	The Mask; Super 8
December	24	Richard Rodney Bennett	76	UK	Composer	Nicholas and Alexandra; Murder on the Orient Express
December	24	Charles Durning	89	US	Actor	The Sting; Dog Day Afternoon
December	24	Jack Klugman	90	US	Actor	12 Angry Men; Days of Wine and Roses
December	26	Gerry Anderson	83	UK	Director, Producer, Screenwriter	Crossroads to Crime; Thunderbirds Are Go
December	27	Harry Carey Jr.	91	US	Actor	Gremlins; The Searchers
December	28	Jon Finch	70	UK	Actor	Death on the Nile; Frenzy
December	30	Mike Hopkins	53	New Zealand	Sound Engineer	Transformers; The Lord of the Rings

== Film debuts ==
- Isabelle Allen – Les Misérables
- Dylan Arnold – Fat Kid Rules the World
- Natasha Bassett – Mental
- Gabriel Bateman – George Biddle, CPA
- Talitha Bateman – George Biddle, CPA
- Lizet Benrey – Tea in a Thunder Cup
- Diego Boneta – Rock of Ages
- John Bradley − Anna Karenina
- Hannibal Buress − Sleepwalk with Me
- Sabrina Carpenter – Noobz
- Emilia Clarke − Spike Island
- Laia Costa − I Want You
- Vinny Curran – Resolution
- Mackenzie Davis – Smashed
- Cara Delevingne − Anna Karenina
- Mike Faist - The Unspeakable Act
- Nell Tiger Free – Broken
- Ryan Guzman − Step Up Revolution
- Kit Harington − Silent Hill: Revelation
- Corey Hawkins – Allegiance
- Kara Hayward – Moonrise Kingdom
- Tom Holland − The Impossible
- Daniel Huttlestone – Les Misérables
- Lily James – Wrath of the Titans
- Charlotte Le Bon – Asterix and Obelix: God Save Britannia
- Greta Lee – Hello I Must Be Going
- Karenssa LeGear – The Kult
- Lashana Lynch – Fast Girls
- Kate McKinnon – My Best Day
- Maika Monroe – At Any Price
- Josh O'Connor – The Eschatrilogy: Book of the Dead
- Leslie Odom Jr. − Red Tails
- Dayo Okeniyi – The Hunger Games
- Jack Quaid – The Hunger Games
- Gayle Rankin – Warfield
- Rihanna – Battleship
- Odeya Rush – The Odd Life of Timothy Green
- Justice Smith – Trigger Finger
- Taylor John Smith – The Hunger Games
- Karan Soni – Safety Not Guaranteed
- Nathan Stewart-Jarrett – The Comedian
- Suki Waterhouse – Pusher
- Anthony Welsh – Red Tails
- Madison Wolfe – On the Road
