= Anand Mhasvekar =

Indian director, producer and poet

- Born: 1 May 1954 (age 72); Mhasve Satara district Maharashtra
- Occupations: playwright, writer, actor, producer
- Years active: 1979–present
- Spouse: Kanta

Anand Mhasvekar is a Marathi playwright, writer director, producer and poet from Maharashtra, India.

He was born in the small village Mhasve in the Satara District, Maharashtra. Mhasvekar was educated in the Satara District and Mumbai. His primary education was in Pachwad and he received a B.Com and M.A. in Marathi from Mumbai University. He worked at the State Bank of India from 1979 to 2000. In 2000 he began working as full-time writer. He and his wife Kanta have two children Vinay and Neeta.

== List of plays ==
- U Turn (यू टर्न)
- Katha (कथा)
- Jodi Jamali Tuzi Mazi (जोडी जमली तुझी माझी)
- Kevha Taree Pahate (केंव्हा तरी पहाटे)
- Jamala Buva Ekadaacha (जमलं बुवा एकदाचं)
- God Father (गाॅड फादर)
- hyancha he asach asata (ह्याचं हे असंच असतं)
- Aani Achanak (आणि अचानक)
- Sagala kahi sukhasathi (सगळ काही सुखासाठी)
- Mothers Day (मदर्स डे)
- Ek don teen chaar (एक दोन तीन चार)
- Darana gunha hai(डरना गुन्हा है)
- Reshim Gathi(रेशीम गाठी)
- Choice is yours (चोएस इज युवर्स)
- Dudhawarachi say (दुधावरची साय)
- Fifty Fifty (फिफ्टी फिफ्टी)
- Sasu number one (सासू नंबर वन)
- Ase navare ashya bayaka (असे नवरे अशा बायका)
- Ase pahune yeti (असे पाहुणे येती)
- Dhav durge dhav ga (धाव दुर्गे धाव गं)
- Te eak kshitij (ते एक क्षितीज)
- Chakori (चाकोरी)
- Popat harvleli manase (पोपट हरवलेली माणसे)
- Gol gol rani (गोल गोल राणी)
- Bayko mazi lai bhari (बायको माझी लई भारी)
- Dharmkand (धर्मकांड)
- Tera divas premache तेरा दिवस प्रेमाचे)
- Excuse me please (एक्स्क्यूज मी प्लीज)
- Pahune aale pala pala (पाहुणे आले पळा पळा)
- Shooting shooting (शूटिंग शूटिंग)
- Ghar japayala have (घर जपायला हवे)
- Sunechya rashila sasu (सुनेच्या राशीला सासू)
- Uturn – 2 (यू टर्न २)
- Savdhan prem chalu aahe (सावधान प्रेम चालू आहे)
- Athang (अथांग)
- Stud farm (स्टड फार्म)
- Surya mhanato chandane de (सूर्य मागतो चांदणे दे)
- Bheja out (भेजा आउट)

== Film writing ==
- Asa mi kay gunha kelaa (असा मी काय गुन्हा केला)
- Bharat ala parat (भरत आला परत)
- Durga Mhanatyat Mala (दुर्गा म्हणत्यात मला)
- Janma (जन्म)
- Amhi Bolato Marathi (आम्ही बोलतो मराठी)
- Saad (साद)
- Trushart (तृषार्त)
- Zentaman (झेंटलमन)

== One Act Plays ==
- Mrutyu dan (मृत्यू दान)
- Kanakhali ganapati kadhin (कानाखाली गणपती काढीन)
- Youth festival (युथ फेस्टीव्हल)
- Aakant (आकांत)
- Gurusakshat parabramha (गुरु साक्षात परब्रह्म)
- Trailer (ट्रेलर)
- Shanti (शांती)
- Lageera (लागीर)
- Prashna kaydyacha aahe (प्रष्ण कायद्याचा आहे)
- Mushak katha (मूषक कथा)
- Tichya atmyas Ashanti labho (तिच्या आत्म्यास अशांती लाभो)
- Ajab tuze sarkar (अजब तुझे सरकार)
- Condolence (कन्डोलंस)
- No apil (नो अपील)
- Tamasha of humanity (तमाशा ऑफ ह्युमॅनिटी)
- Vanz vena (वांझ वेणा)
- Jignani (जिगनानी)
- Vitalele rang (विटलेले रंग)

== TV serials ==
- Hya Gojirvanya Gharat (ह्या गोजिरवाण्या घरात) )
- Char Divas Sasuche (चार दिवस सासूचे) )
- Chiranjiv Saubhagya Kankshini (चिरंजीव सौभाग्य कांक्षिणी)
- Kurukshetra (कुरुक्षेत्र)
- Uchapati (उचापती)
- Bhagyalakshmi (भाग्यलक्ष्मी)
- Vada Chirebandi (वाडा चिरेबंदी)
- Girid Interpole (गिरिड इंटरपोल)
- Dosh na konacha (दोष न कुणाचा)
- Kabhi ye Kabhi wo (कभी ये कभी वो)(हिंदी)
- Hal Kaisa Hai Janab Ka (हाल कैसा है जनाब का)(हिंदी)

== Film Direction ==
- Asa mi kay gunha kela (असा मी काय गुन्हा केला)
- Amhi Bolato Marathi (आम्ही बोलतो मराठी)

== Film Acting ==
- Bhaucha Dhakka (भाऊचा धक्का)
- Asa mi kay gunha kela (असा मी काय गुन्हा केला)
- Amhi Bolato Marathi (आम्ही बोलतो मराठी)
- Bharat ala parat (भरत आला परत)

== Awards ==
- Maharashtra rajya shasan vyavasaaik natya mahotsav 2008–09 best writer
- Maharashtra rajya shasan vyavasaaik natya mahotsav 2008–09 best Director
- Chaturang Sawai Lekhak 1995
- Akhil bharatiy Marathi natya parishad best writer Acharya atre award
- Akhil bharatiy Marathi natya parishad best Director Gopinath Savarkar award
- Akhil bharatiy Marathi natya parishad best writer G B Deval award
- Mumbai Marathi Sahitya Sangh best writer award
- Mumbai Marathi Granth Sangrahalay best writer award
- Mumbai Durdarshan Manik Award
- Sanmitra Thane Award
