= Ante Garmaz =

Argentine model and fashion designer (1928–2011)

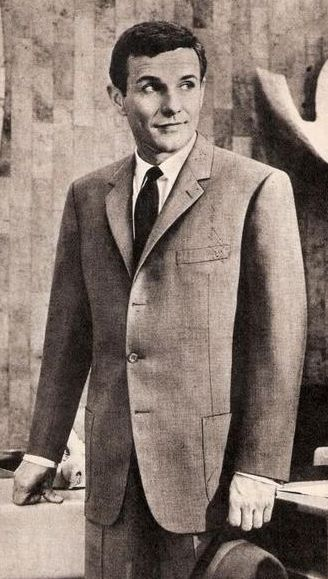
- Garmaz in 1965
- Born: 7 January 1928; Zagreb, Kingdom of Yugoslavia (present-day Croatia)
- Died: 16 July 2011 (aged 83); Buenos Aires, Argentina
- Other name: Antonio Jorge Garmaz
- Occupations: Actor; fashion designer; model; television presenter
- Years active: 1947–2011

Ante Garmaz (7 January 1928 – 16 July 2011), also known as Antonio Jorge Garmaz, was an Argentine actor, fashion designer, presenter and model who was active in the Argentine entertainment scene and social life from the 1950s until his death. Born in Zagreb, his family emigrated to Argentina when he was four years old.

== Career ==
Garmaz was born in Zagreb, present-day Croatia, on 7 January 1928. His family emigrated to Argentina when he was four years old, settling in the city of Las Breñas, in the northern Chaco Province, which had a thriving Yugoslav community at the time. In Las Breñas, Garmaz's parents opened a boarding house to get by financially. In 1940, the family moved to Rosario, in the nearby province of Santa Fe, where he graduated from the city's Mariano Moreno school before moving in 1947 to Buenos Aires.

In Buenos Aires, Garmaz began a career as a model during times in which it was hard to be a male model in a more conservative Argentine society of the time. Regardless of homosexuality being the subject of controversies as well as other consequences in the 1940s, Garmaz never hid the fact that he was a gay man. In his later years he liked to jokingly say that "only (my) partners are gay." His flamboyance and eccentricism drew the attention of several filmmakers who called him to act in some national productions. Among the directors who hired Garmaz were Fernando Ayala for Triángulo de cuatro (1975) and Carlos Borcosque Jr. for El soltero (1977). He also acted in Men Only Think of That in 1976.

Garmaz's style attracted criticism from conservative sectors. For example, in 1960, he made Amadeo Carrizo, the goalkeeper of the Argentina national football team put on a fur coat and model with it. Garmaz's involvement with the football world was also significant in his career. An avid fan of Boca Juniors, he caused controversy in 1975 by agreeing to design a necktie for River Plate manager Ángel Labruna. In 2003, Garmaz also designed the suits of the Boca Juniors team to travel to Japan for the 2003 Intercontinental Cup match against AC Milan. He also financially helped the players of Chaco For Ever after the team was relegated in 1998. Garmaz helped pay for the trips and the accommodation of the players in Rafaela for the decisive match.

Garmaz died aged 83 on 16 July 2011 at Hospital Fernández in Palermo, Buenos Aires, after a long illness which had developed into an intensive care hospitalisation hours before his death.

== Legacy ==
Garmaz was known for collecting ties and admiring Frank Sinatra, as well as for his socialisation with well-known figures like Alfredo Olmedo, Jorge Porcel, Antonio Gasalla, Marcelo Tinelli, Susana Giménez and Mirtha Legrand.

In the case of Giménez, she had a very close relationship with Garmaz. In September 2024, during a conversation in her show with players Leandro Paredes and Rodrigo de Paul, Giménez clarified when Paredes asked her if Garmaz had been her boyfriend, that the two had been just friends, highlighting that Garmaz was gay and that he had always been open about that.

The necktie that Garmaz designed for River's coach, Ángel Labruna, left a lasting cultural mark in the club's history, with manager Marcelo Gallardo wearing Labruna's tie in a Superclásico match against Boca and other matches. The association between the necktie's design and good results led to the tie being called the "Necktie of Glory", and it became a marketing item for the club, which sold it on online platforms to gather money for benefic activities in 2022.

== Selected roles ==
=== Film ===
Year	Title	Role	Ref.
1965	Cosquín, amor y folclore		
1975	Triángulo de cuatro		
1976	Men Only Think of That		
1977	El soltero		

=== Television ===
Year	Title	Role	Ref.
1999	Muñeca Brava		
1999	La Argentina de Tato	General Kristopher Garmaz	
