= List of Marathi films of 2011 =

A list of films produced by the Marathi language film industry based in Maharashtra in the year 2011.

== January – March ==
	Opening	Title	'Director	'Writer	Cast	Genre	Source
J A N	7	Durga Mhantyat Mala	Raju Parsekar	Anand Mhasvekar	Deepali Sayyad, Milind Gawali, Surekha Kudachi, Sakshi Tisgavkar, Madhu Kambikar	Drama	
J A N	7	Ramabai Bhimrao Ambedkar	Prakash Jadhav		Nisha Parulekar, Ganesh Jethe, Dashrath Hatiskar, Snehal Vilankar, Anil Sutar	Historical	
J A N	14	Ati Kela Matit Gela					
J A N	14	Guldasta	Hemant Deodhar	Arvind Jagtap	Makarand Anaspure, Jitendra Joshi, Tejaswini Lonari	Romance	
J A N	21	Shahanpan Dega Deva	Sudesh Manjrekar		Ankush Choudhary, Bharat Jadhav, Siddharth Jadhav	Comedy	
J A N	28	Manyaa - The Wonder Boy	Sangramsinh Gaikwad	Prasad Gavade	Vignesh Joshi, Madhvi Juvekar, Amitriyaan Lead, Rishiraj Pawar, Rajesh Shringaruore, Mayuri Wagh	Children	
F E B	4	Aarambh					
F E B	4	Dhava Dhav	Bharat Gaikwad	Shashank Udapurkar	Bharat Jadhav, Shashank Udapurkar, Mohan Joshi, Smita Jaykar	Comedy	
F E B	11	Mala Aai Vhhaychy!	Samruoddhi Porey		Urmila Kanetkar, Stacy Bee, Samruoddhi Porey, Aiden Barkely, Vivek Raut, Sulbha Deshpande	Drama	
F E B	11	Pakda Pakdi	Sandeep Navare		Tejaswini Pandit	Comedy	
F E B	18	Mohan Aawatey	Subhash Kale		Sanjay Narvekar, Siya Patil, Kamlakar Satpute, Suhas Paranjape and Ashok Shinde	Romance / Drama	
F E B	25	Davpech	Bhimrao Mude, Sachin Vartak		Makarand Anaspure, Bharat Jadhav, Kushal Badrike	Politics	
M A R	19	Ragging Ek Vikruti	[Vijay Shinde]	[Vijay Shinde]	Harsh Kulkarni, Pooja J., Hrishikesh Karmalkar		
M A R	25	Don Ghadicha Daav			Sai Tamhankar, Makarand Anaspure		

== April – June ==
	Opening	Title	Director	Writer	Cast	Genre	Source
A P R	1	Sadrakshanay	Vikram Labhe	Vikram Labhe	Tushar Dalvi, Manasi Salvi	Crime, Thriller	
A P R	8	Paach Naar Ek Bejaar	Vijay Satghare	Anil Pawar	Sanjay Narvekar, Aditi Sarangdhar, Shweta Mehendale, Leena Bhagwat, Hemangi Kavee, Harshali Zine, Vijay Chavan, Yatin Karyekar, Kishor Nandalaskar and Pradeep Patwardhan	Comedy	
A P R	15	Parat Phira Re (Lets go back)	Ramkumar shedge				
A P R	15	Taryanche Bait	Kiran Yagnopavit		Sachin Khedekar, Ashwini Giri, Shubhangi Joshi and Milind Pathak	Suspense / Thriller	
A P R	29	Hari Mazya Ghari					
A P R	29	Mast Chalalay Aamcha	Sachin Goswami		Bharat Jadhav, Vijay Patkar, Bhushan Kadu, Vishakha Subhedar, Kamalakar Satpute, Bhalchandra Kadam and Kishori Ambiye	Comedy	
M A Y	6	Aare Baba Pure	Pranay Telang, Chetan Malusare		Sanjay Narvekar, Vijay Chavan, Ravindra Berde, Anand Abhyankar, Jayraj Nair, Jaywant Wadkar, Amey Hunaswadkar, Bhushan Ghadi, Arun Kadam, Paurnima Ahre, Ruchita Jadhav	Drama	
M A Y	6	Balgandharva	Ravindra Harishchandra Jadhav		Subodh Bhave, Vibhavari Deshpande, Avinash Narkar, Siddharth Chandekar, Kishor Kadam, Anand Abhyankar, Nitin Chandrakant Desai and Rahul Deshpande	Biographical	
M A Y	6	Gajar - Journey Of The Soul	Ajit Bhairavkar		Chinmay Mandlekar, Sukhada Yash, Edward Sonnenblick, Suhas Shirsat		
M A Y	13	Aata Ga Baya	Sanjay Narvekar		Sanjay Narvekar, Pooja Sawant	Drama	
M A Y	13	Hip Hip Hurray					
M A Y	20	Kunasathi Kunitari	Rekha Saray		Ashok Saraf, Poonam Dhillon, Smita Jaykar, Aaditi Pohankar	Drama	
M A Y	20	Pangira	Rajiv Patil		Meeta Sawarkar, Santosh Juvekar, Kishor Kadam	Drama	
M A Y	20	Rajmata Jijau	Yashwant Bhalkar		Smita Deshmukh, Milind Gunaji, Amol Kolhe, Rahul Solapurkar	Epic	
M A Y	27	Ardha Gangu Ardha Gondya	Jr. Mehmood		Viju Khote, Deepak Rajput, Dr. Pramod Nalawade, Kushal Badrike	Drama	
M A Y	27	Bhaucha Dhakka	Vicky Kharat		Siddarth Jadhav, Mohan Joshi, Satish Taare, Anand Mhasvekar	Comedy	
M A Y	27	Janma	Shirish Rane	Anand Mhasvekar	Reema Lagoo, Anand Abhyankar, Vina Gamkar, Jayesh Raje	Drama	
M A Y	27	Superstar	Mahendra Kadam		Siddarth Jadhav, Pady Kamble, Megha	Comedy / Drama	
J U N	10	2014 Raj Ka Ran	Pradeep Bhore		Ramesh Deo, Sudesh Mhashalikar, Deepak Karanjikar	Drama	
J U N	10	Ichar Tharla Pakka	Manohar Sarvankar		Bharat Jadhav, Prachi Shah, Vijay Chavan, Rekha Bade, Dipti Ahir, Tejashree	Romance	
J U N	10	Trusha	Rohaan Satghare		Sharayu Jaywant, Shantanu Moghe, Bhushan Pradhan	Drama	
J U N	17	Dnyaneshwari Express	Prakash Panchal		Akshaya Bhingarde, Anand Abhyankar, Girish Oak	Drama film	
J U N	17	Rajkaran				Politics	
J U N	24	Khunnas					

== July – September ==
	Opening	Title	Director	Cast	Genre	Source
J U L	15	Platform				
J U L	29	Dhav Manya Dhav				
A U G	5	Eka Shabdat Sangato	Gajendra Ahire	Kiran Karmarkar, Murli Sharma, Ashwini Kalsekar	Action / Drama	
A U G	5	Fakta Ladh Mhana	Sanjay Jadhav	Sachin Khedekar, Bharat Jadhav, Sanjay Narvekar	Action / Drama	
A U G	12	Ashi Fasli Nanachi Tang	Deepak Sawakhande	Mohan Joshi, Priya Barde, Smita Gondkar, Mangesh Desai	Action / Comedy	
A U G	12	Dhoosar	Amol Palekar	Reema Lagoo, Smita Tambe, Upendra Limaye, Amruta Khanvilkar	Drama	
A U G	19	Morya	Avadhoot Gupte	Santosh Juvekar, Chinmay Mandlekar, Dilip Prabhavalkar	Drama	
A U G	26	Dhoom 2 Dhamaal	Sachin Goswami	Ashok Saraf, Pushkar Jog, Tyagraj Khadilkar, Siya Patil, Sushant Shelar	Comedy	
S E P	16	Arjun	F. M. Ilyas	Sachit Patil, Amruta Khanvilkar, Vinay Apte	Action / Drama	

== October – December ==
	Opening	Title	Director	Cast	Genre	Source
O C T	6	Teecha Baap Tyacha Baap	Atul Kale	Sachin Pilgaonkar, Arun Nalawade, Makarand Anaspure, Abhishek Sethiya, Mrinmayee Godbole	Romance / Comedy	
O C T	14	Adgula Madgula	Nagesh Bhosle	Subodh Bhave, Girija Oak, Smita Talwalkar	Comedy / Drama	
O C T	14	Tamasha - Hach Khel Udya Punha	Milind Pendnekar	Bharat Jadhav, Priya Arun, Ramesh Bhatkar	Drama	
O C T	21	Sansarachi Maya	Deepak Kadam	Yogesh Mahajan, Maithili Javkar, Swapnil Rajshekhar	Drama	
N O V	4	Deool	Umesh Vinayak Kulkarni	Nana Patekar, Dilip Prabhavalkar, Girish Kulkarni, Sonali Kulkarni, Mohan Agashe and Kishor Kadam	Drama	
N O V	11	Dubhang	Mahesh Kothare	Adinath Kothare, Urmila Kanetkar, Ajinkya Deo	Romance / Drama	
N O V	11	Mamachya Rashila Bhacha	Pramod Joshi	Mohan Joshi, Siddharth Jadhav, Vijay Patkar, Vijay Gokhale	Comedy	
N O V	11	Swarajya... Marathi Paul Padte Pudhe	Vishal-Vihar	Rajesh Shringapure, Darshan Jariwala, Arun Nalawade	Drama	
N O V	18	Paulwaat	Aditya Ingale	Subodh Bhave, Jyoti Chandekar, Anand Ingle	Drama	
N O V	18	What An Idea Mai !	Pravin Shetye	Usha Nadkarni, Mohan Joshi, Twisha Bhatt	Comedy / Drama	
N O V	25	Hello Jai Hind!	Gajendra Ahire	Nitin Chandrakant Desai, Trupti Bhoir, Kedar Shinde, Vinay Apte	Drama	
N O V	25	Saat Bara Kasa Badalala	Deepak Kadam	Swapnil Rajshekhar, Lokesh Gupte, Ravi Patwardhan, Tanvi Kale	Drama	
D E C	2	Sagla Karun Bhagle	Vijay Patkar	Makarand Anaspure, Chetan Dalvi, Shweta Mehendale	Drama	
D E C	9	Dambis	Makrand Anaspure	Makarand Anaspure, Subhankar Atre, Lokesh Gupte	Comedy / Drama	
D E C	9	Parambi	Satish Salagre	Bhushan Pradhan, Sai Lokur, Uday Tikekar, Vijay Gokhale	Romance / Drama	
D E C	9	Pratibimb	Girish Mohite	Ankush Choudhary, Sonali Kulkarni, Ravindra Mankani	Suspense / Drama	
D E C	16	One Room Kitchen	Mahesh Tilekar	Helen, Bharat Jadhav, Bhargavi Chirmule	Family / Drama	
D E C	16	Sharyat	Viju Mane	Sachin Pilgaonkar, Santosh Juvekar, Neena Kulkarni	Action / Drama	
D E C	23	Tuch Khari Gharachi Laxmi	Vijay Bhanu	Sunil Barve, Teja Devkar, Aditi Sarangdhar	Family / Drama	
D E C	30	Zhakaas	Ankush Choudhary	Ankush Choudhary, Amruta Khanvilkar, Sai Tamhankar	Comedy / Drama	
