= Walter Kutschmann =

German Gestapo officer (1914–1986)

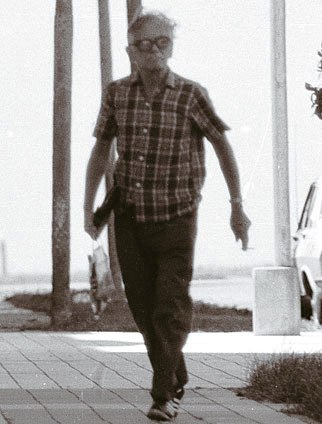
- Kutschmann in Miramar, Argentina, 26 December 1975
- Born: 24 July 1914; Dresden, German Empire
- Died: 30 August 1986 (aged 72); Buenos Aires, Argentina
- Burial place: Los Polvorines cemetery, Buenos Aires Province
- Military career
- Allegiance: Nazi Germany
- Branch: Schutzstaffel
- Service years: 1932–1936; 1939–1944
- Rank: SS-Untersturmführer
- Units: Einsatzkommando; Gestapo

Walter Kutschmann (24 July 1914 – 30 August 1986) was a German SS-Untersturmführer and Gestapo officer, a member of an Einsatzkommando, based first in Lwów, Poland (today Lviv, Ukraine), and later in Drohobycz. He was responsible for the massacre of 1,500 Polish Jews in Lwów in the years 1941–1942. Kutschmann fled to Argentina using an assumed name in 1948 and lived undetected until 1975. When his true identity was discovered that year, he avoided arrest and evaded capture until 1985. Kutschmann was tracked down and arrested by Interpol that year, but he died in custody before he could be extradited to West Germany to face trial.

== Early life and career ==
Walter Kutschmann was born in Dresden in 1914, the son of a dentist. In 1928, he joined the Hitler Youth. In 1932, he enlisted in the Luftwaffe, in which he served until 1936. Kutschmann began to study law, but left this career path to join the Condor Legion, loyal to the forces of Francisco Franco in Spain, participating in the Spanish Civil War. There he was later the third secretary of the German consulate in Cádiz. Kutschmann was a relative latecomer to the Nazi Party (membership number 7,475,729) and the SS (membership number 404,651).

== Wartime criminal activity in Poland and Ukraine ==
At the start of the Second World War, he moved to Leipzig, where he joined the local SiPo (Security Police) forces commanded by Karl Eberhard Schöngarth. Kutschmann was promoted to SS-Untersturmführer and was the commanding officer of an Einsatzkommando unit that operated in Drohobycz, Poland. Under his leadership, they carried out the massacre of Lwów professors in 1941. In 1942, he ordered the murder of 1,500 Polish intellectuals in the Lwów region, in Brzeziny and Podhajce in what is now part of Ukraine. Witnesses said the Ukrainians who were ordered to dig the graves for the killings were themselves later slain on Kutschmann's orders. Witnesses also claim that Kutschmann shot a 17 or 18-year-old Jewish housemaid in Drohobycz in 1941, where he headed the local Gestapo office, after he accused her of having transmitted a venereal disease to him. In 1944, on the orders of intelligence officer Hans Günther von Dincklage, he was transferred to Paris, where he was briefly associated with Coco Chanel during Operation Modellhut. While in France at the end of 1944, Kutschmann defected to seek refuge in Vigo, Spain under the fake identity of a Carmelite friar named Pedro Ricardo Olmo, residing in Vigo.

== Post-war flight, discovery and capture ==
When the French government began to investigate Nazi fugitives in 1947, he sought protection in the ODESSA network and fled to Argentina on the ocean liner MV Monte Amboto, under the guise of friar Pedro Ricardo Olmo, arriving on 16 January 1948. Kutschmann led a low-profile life working in a hardware store, then as a taxi driver. Later, he was hired by Osram, a German lighting manufacturer, where Kutschmann served as purchasing manager. In August 1973, he married Geralda Baeumler, an Argentine citizen of German origin, a businesswoman and a veterinarian. When his true identity was uncovered in 1975, Kutschmann left his job and settled with his wife in the resort town of Miramar, in the southern region of Buenos Aires Province.

Renowned Vienna-based Austrian Nazi hunter Simon Wiesenthal arranged the extradition of Kutschmann. In 1975, after checking Kutschmann's citizenship and marriage, which proved false, Interpol requested his arrest. In July 1975, a Holocaust survivors' group called Israeli Association of Survivors of Nazi Persecution, informed the Argentine president Isabel Martínez de Perón’s government that Kutschmann was living in the country under a false identity. The Holocaust survivors’ group provided details including Kutschmann's alias, address and the name of his employer.

On 26 December 1975, journalist Alfredo Serra of Gente magazine, thanks to a tip from an unnamed businessman from Greater Buenos Aires, tracked Kutschmann down and photographed him outside his apartment in Miramar. Kutschmann eventually accepted a brief interview with Serra. He admitted his real identity, complained that he was a "dead man walking" and accused Serra of handing him to his "assassins". His wife claimed that Wiesenthal actions at the time were a consequence of the recent Helsinki Accords. Kutschmann said that ODESSA was "just a book, a fantasy" and rejected any comparison with other war criminals, such as Martin Bormann, Joseph Mengele or Klaus Barbie, defending his behaviour as that of a "soldier in a war". The Argentine government attempted to arrest him, but he escaped and evaded capture for the next ten years. In 1975, his Argentine citizenship was revoked.

The Anti-Defamation League provided information contributing to the capture of Kutschmann in 1985. The ADL provided identifying information regarding his scars from the Spanish Civil War, his tattoos, and his blood type. A second extradition request was made in 1985, and he was again arrested by Interpol agents in Florida in the Vicente López Partido in Greater Buenos Aires. Given his precarious health, he was kept in Hospital General de Agudos Juan A. Fernández in Buenos Aires, where he died of a heart attack in 1986 before he could be extradited to West Germany. Had he been extradited, Walter Kutschmann would have been the first Nazi war criminal handed over by Argentina. Kutschmann was buried in Los Polvorines, Buenos Aires Province.

His wife was reported to the authorities for animal abuse, specifically for euthanizing homeless dogs in gas chambers.

== See also ==
- Aktion AB - the Nazi campaign against Polish intelligentsia that preceded in the professors massacre in Lwów
- Eduard Roschmann - another Nazi war criminal who fled to South America under a false identity
