= Men Only Think of That =

- Spanish: Los Hombres sólo piensan en eso
- Directed by: Enrique Cahen Salaberry
- Release date: 1976
- Running time: 90 minute
- Country: Argentina
- Language: Spanish

Men Only Think of That (Spanish: Los Hombres sólo piensan en eso) is a 1976 Argentine film directed by Enrique Cahen Salaberry.

== Cast ==
- Alfredo Olmedo
- Susana Giménez
- Jorge Porcel
- Ante Garmaz
