= Hospital Fernández =

Hospital in Palermo, Buenos Aires, Argentina

Coordinates: 34°34′53″S 58°24′25″W

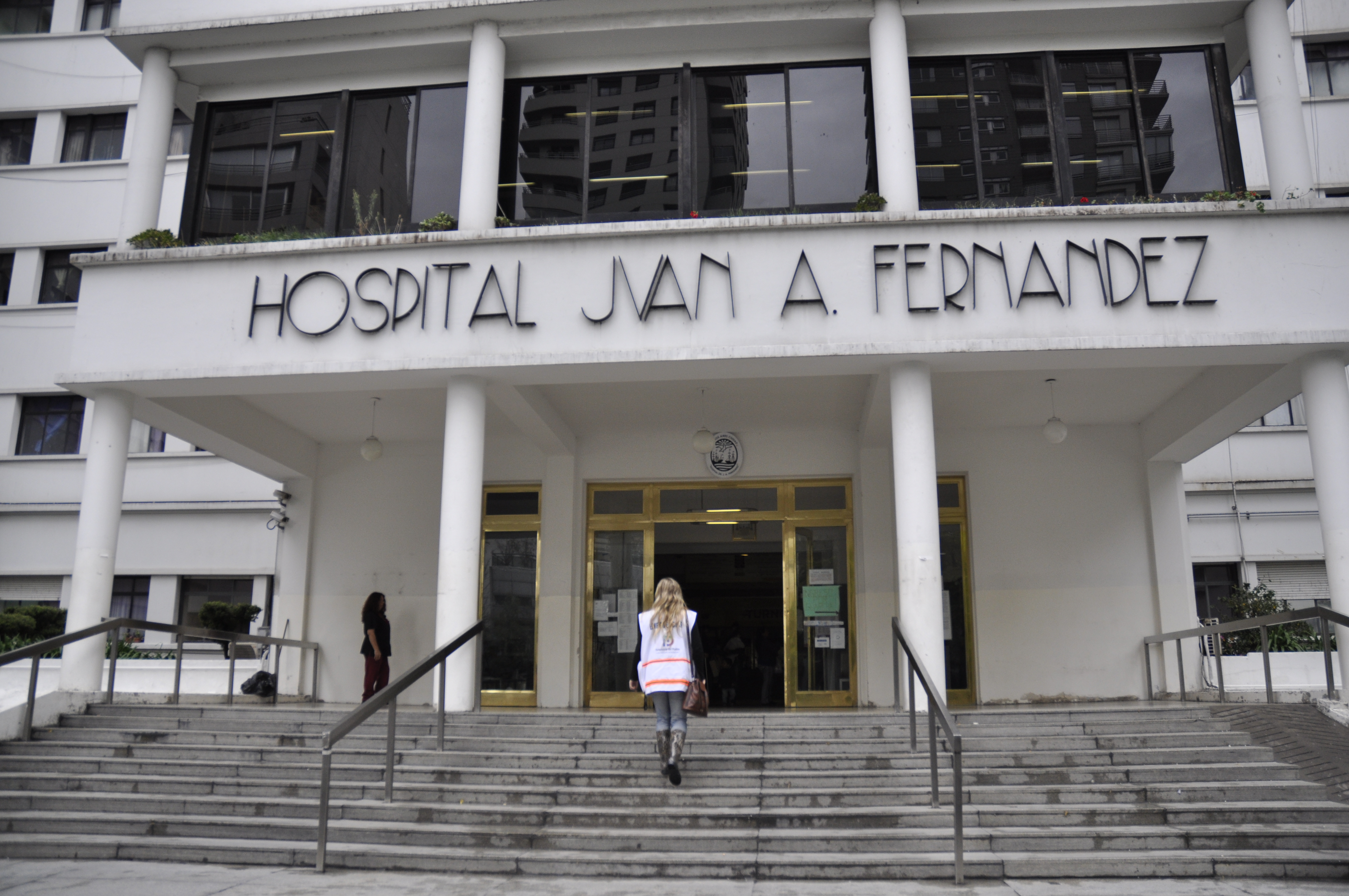
Fernández Hospital

The Fernández Hospital (Hospital General de Agudos Dr. Juan A. Fernández) is a public hospital in the Palermo section of Buenos Aires, Argentina.

Founded in 1889 as the Municipal syphilis hospital, it served what at the time was one of the city's seedier neighborhoods, and was originally housed in a drab, one-story building removed from view. Operating during a socio-economic boom in Argentina, the facility was reestablished as the Hospital of the North in 1893, and began serving the general public; in 1904, it was renamed in honor of Dr. Juan Antonio Fernández (1786 – 1855), the first Dean of the University of Buenos Aires School of Medicine, as well as founder of the National Academy of Medicine.

The increasing demand for the facility, which prompted numerous changes and additions to the building, prompted the demolition of the older structures in favor of an 11-story, Rationalist building. Inaugurated in 1943, the new building houses a staff of 1,600 doctors and nurses, and is operated by the Municipal Government of Buenos Aires.

== Notable patients who have been in the hospital ==
- Jean-Pierre Wimille, French race car driver, died on January 28, 1949.
- Jose Froilan Gonzalez, Argentine rece car driver, was treated for heat stroke and intoxication after the Buenos Aires Grand Prix in 1949.
- Walter Kutschmann, ex Gestapo officer, died on August 30, 1986.
- Ante Garmaz, actor, fashion designer and model, died on 16 July 2011
- Beatriz Bonnet, Argentinian actress, died on 19 February 2020.
- Miguel Ángel Castellini, Argentinian boxer, died on October 27, 2020
- Norma Cappagli, Argentinian model, former Miss World, died on December 22, 2020.
