= Susana Giménez =

Argentine actress and TV host

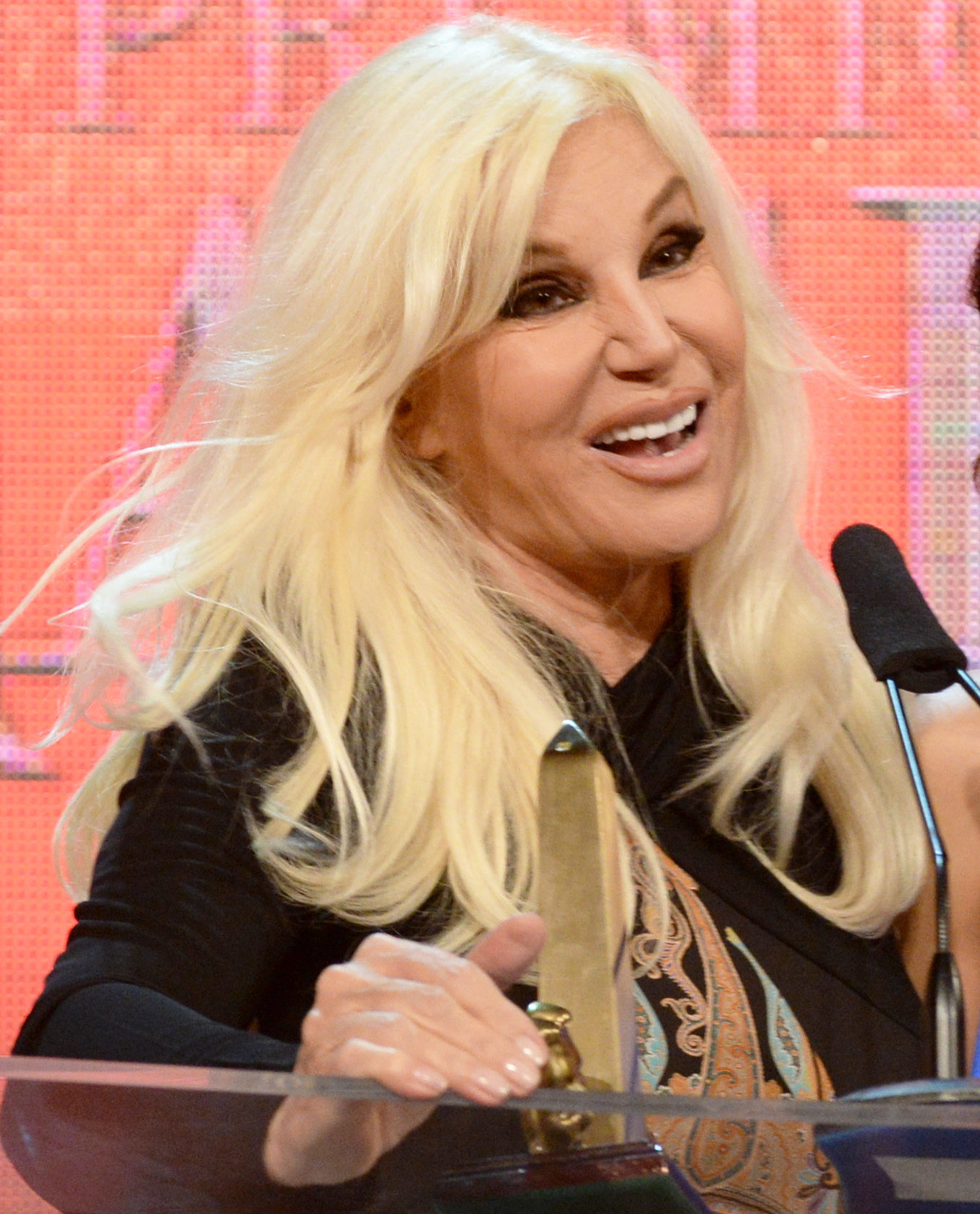
- Giménez in 2015
- Born: María Susana Giménez-Aubert; 29 January 1944 (age 82); Palermo, Buenos Aires, Argentina
- Occupations: Host, businesswoman, actress, model, vedette
- Years active: 1968–present
- Partners: Mario Sarrabayrouse (1962–1967); Carlos Monzón (1974–1978); Ricardo Darín (1978–1987); Huberto Roviralta (1988–1998)

María Susana Giménez-Aubert (born 29 January 1944), known as Susana Giménez (Spanish pronunciation: [suˈsana xiˈmenes]), is an Argentine TV host, actress, model and businesswoman. In 2012, she was considered the biggest celebrity in Argentine television by the media firm that publishes her eponymous magazine.

She is the host of Susana Giménez, a highly rated television variety show in Argentina, similar in format to those of Raffaella Carrà (in Italy and Spain) and Oprah Winfrey (in United States). In 1997, she was awarded with the Golden Martín Fierro Award, and in 2002 won the INTE Award for TV Hostess of the Year. Since 2020, she lives in Uruguay.

== Early life ==
Giménez was the daughter of María Luisa Sanders, of Irish descent, and Augusto Giménez Aubert, of Spanish descent. She had a hard childhood, tainted by her parents' separation. She studied in Quilmes, and graduated from La Anunciata Collegiate as a primary school teacher, a profession she never practised. Before becoming famous, for a couple of years Giménez worked as an executive secretary for a large factory.

=== 1990s ===
On 30 January 1998, Susana Giménez and former polo player Huberto Roviralta agreed to the terms of their divorce in Miami. On 11 February, Giménez returned from Miami to her home and found that Roviralta was still living there. After an argument, he emerged from the house with an injured nose and blood on his face. At a press conference the following day, Giménez said, "Huberto me empujó, trató de agredirme, y yo me defendí y le tiré con un cenicero" ("Huberto pushed me, tried to attack me, and I defended myself and threw an ashtray at him").

== Career ==
At 19 years old, she became a model, and made her name in a TV commercial for Cadum, a brand of French soap. Most of her subsequent film career was in adult-oriented comedies, acting opposite Alberto Olmedo, Jorge Porcel, Ante Garmaz and fellow vedette Moria Casán. Giménez has acted in over 30 films, including the cult film La Mary, and 10 plays. In 2008, Giménez launched her own magazine called Susana, published by La Nación. She is featured in the cover of every issue. She had her own fashion doll, and has endorsed two fragrances.

== Personal life ==
In 1962, aged 18, she married businessman Mario Sarabayrouse. A year later she gave birth to her only daughter, Mercedes Sarabayrouse Giménez.

In 1974 she starred in La Mary, a film directed by Daniel Tinayre, where she met boxer Carlos Monzón, with whom she started a relationship that lasted two years. For 9 years she was in a relationship with actor Ricardo Darín, who was thirteen years younger. They ended up on good terms, remaining great friends. Susana would invite the actor as the first guest every year on her show.

In 1988 she married Huberto Roviralta, a polo player, whom she divorced in 1998. She had to pay ten million dollars to Roviralta as a divorce settlement.

From her daughter Mercedes, Giménez has two grandchildren, Lucía and Manuel. In private her family and friends call her "Su", a practice that has been adopted by her fans.

== Filmography ==
Title	Year	Role	Notes
El gran robo	1968		
Story of a Poor Young Man	1968	Extra	
En mi casa mando yo	1968	Jodie Swearingen	
Tiro de gracia	1969	Laucha	
Fuiste mía un verano	1969	Aquella Mujer	
Sótano Beat	1969		Television (Canal 13)
Los mochileros	1970	Alejandra	
El mundo es de los jóvenes	1970		
Matrimonios y algo más	1970–1972	Various	Television series (Canal 13); Martín Fierro Award for Best New Actress (1970)
La buscona	1971		
Así es Buenos Aires	1971		
Los neuróticos	1971		
Todos los pecados del mundo	1972		
Vení conmigo	1972		
He nacido en la ribera	1972	Susana	
La piel del amor	1973		
La Mary	1974	Mary	She met Carlos Monzón
Mi novia el...	1975	Dominique / María Isabel	
The Last Round	1976	Maristella	shot in Italy, director Stelvio Massi
Tú me enloqueces	1976		
Los Hombres sólo piensan en eso	1976	Susana	
Un toque diferente	1977		
Basta de mujeres	1977		
El Macho	1977	Soledad	shot in Italy, director Marcello Andrei
Yo también tengo fiaca!	1978	Marta	
Donde duermen dos... duermen tres	1979	Martha	
El rey de los exhortos	1979	Susana Lezama	
Alberto y Susana	1980	Susana	Television sketch comedy show (Canal 13)
A los cirujanos se les va la mano	1980		
Las mujeres son cosa de guapos	1981		
Un terceto peculiar	1981	Susana Sanguinetti	
Hola Susana	1987	Herself	Television talk show (ATC)
Me sobra un marido	1987	Corina	
Hola Susana	1988–1991	Herself	Television talk show (Canal 9)
Hola Susana, te estamos llamando	1992–1997	Herself	Television talk show (Telefe); Martín Fierro Award for Best entertainment show (1995); Gold Martín Fierro Award (1995); Martín Fierro Award for Best female host (1996); Martín Fierro Award for Best female host (1997)
Susana Gimenéz	1998–present	Herself	Television talk show (Telefe); Martín Fierro Award for Best female host (1998); Martín Fierro Award for Best female host (2000); Paoli Award for Best integral show (2000); Martín Fierro Award for Best female host (2001); Martín Fierro Award for Best female host (2002); Martín Fierro Award for Best entertainment show (2005); Martín Fierro Award for Best female host (2006); Martín Fierro Award for Trajectory (2007); Martín Fierro Award for Best entertainment show (2008); Martín Fierro Award for Best entertainment show (2009); Platinum Martín Fierro Award (2010); Martín Fierro Award for Best entertainment show (2011); Martín Fierro Award for Best female host (2012); Martín Fierro Award for Trajectory (2012)
Esa maldita costilla	1999	Azucena	
Tetro	2009	Herself	Cameo appearance
Delirium	2014	Herself, as President of Argentina	
El host	2018	Herself	
Porno y Helado	2022	Roxana	2 episodes
LOL: Last One Laughing Argentina	2023–present	Herself	

== Awards ==
=== Martín Fierro Awards ===
- Martín Fierro Best New Actress for Marriageand more (1969)
- Martín Fierro for best entertainment programwithHola Susana (1994)
- Martín Fierro de Oro (1995)
- Martín Fierro Best Female talk show host (1995)
- Martín Fierro Best Female talk show host (1998)
- Martín Fierro Best Female talk show host (1999)
- Martín Fierro Best Female talk show host (2000)
- Martín Fierro Best Female talk show host (2001)
- Martín Fierro for best entertainment program for Susana Gimenez (2004)
- Martín Fierro Best Female Host (2005)
- Martín Fierro Recognition (2006)
- Martín Fierro for best entertainment program for Susana Gimenez (2007)
- Martín Fierro for best entertainment program for Susana Gimenez (2008)
- Martín Fierro of Platin (2009)
- Martín Fierro of Platin for Hola Susana (2010)
- Martín Fierro for best entertainment program for Susana Gimenez (2011)
- Martín Fierro Best Female talk show host (2012)
- Martín Fierro for the trajectory of 25 years of her program (2012)

== Other awards ==
- Sea Star with Woman of the Year (1983)
- Carlos '86 with Woman of the Year (1986)
- Konex to musical actress of the decade (1991)
- Prensario (1991)
- Broadcasting (1993)
- Distinction Argentores (1995)
- Prensario (1993)
- Prensario (1995)
- Golden Cap (1995) Gente Magazine (star that tops took over, 128 times)
- Broadcasting (1996)
- Paoli best comprehensive program (2000)
- Paoli to the most popular figure (2000)
- Llave de Puerto Rico (2001)
- Paoli to the international career (2002)
- INTE TV HISPANIC TV the cheerleader of the year (2002)
- Clarín, the best TV host (2004)
- Profile to the best production with current celebrity (2005)
- Cover Caras (2005) (210 times)
- FUNDTV the best entertainment: Susana Giménez: The Unbeatable (2005)
- People of Peru to the prime abroad program (2005)
- Llave de Punta del Este (2004)
- Bal Habour Key (2004)
- Latin Grammy presidency, awarded to the successful Argentina conductive for his help to promote and spread the music of Latino artists (2008)
- Pléyade Magazine Award for "Susana" (2008)
- Award "Referrer" by the "International Foundation Young Leaders" (2009)
- Godmother of the National Festival of the Sun (2009–2010)
- Godmother of the Favaloro Foundation (2009)
- Career Silver Condor award (2014)
