= Susana (magazine) =

- October 2012 issue.
- Categories: Women's magazine
- Frequency: Monthly
- Circulation: 51.615/month
- Founded: 2008
- Final issue: May 2018
- Company: La Nación S.A. (from 2011); Grupo Q (2008-2011)
- Country: Argentina
- Language: Spanish
- Website: www.revistasusana.com

Susana was an Argentinian magazine for women directed by Susana Giménez, a big celebrity in Argentine television. Inspired by other international figures' publications, such as O, The Oprah Magazine by Oprah Winfrey and AR by Ana Rosa Quintana, the magazine was named after her, and she appeared on every cover. It was first published in 2008 and included articles on women's issues, relationships, sex, health, careers, self-improvement and celebrities, as well as fashion and beauty. Many of the articles were about Giménez herself. The last issue was published in May 2018.

Giménez presented her magazine in 2008 in Alvear Palace Hotel with guests including Mirtha Legrand, Ricardo Darín, Mauricio Macri and Guillermo Francella. Originally published by Grupo Q, it was purchased by La Nación in 2011.

Its columnists included the sexologist Alessandra Rampolla, the radio and television host Maju Lozano, the journalist Claudio María Domínguez and the director and producer Osvaldo Cattone.
