= Terry Teene =

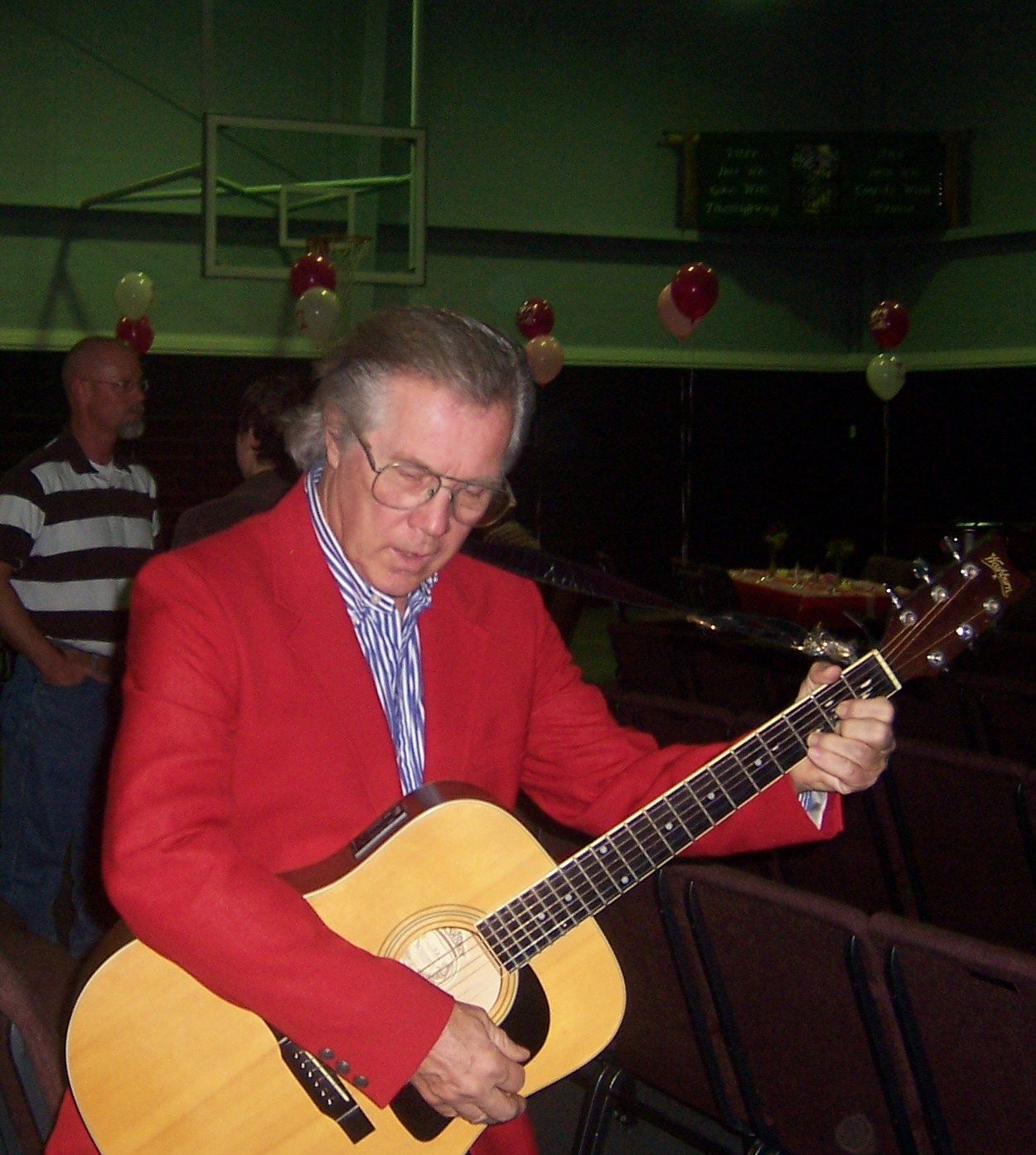

Background information
- Also known as: "ToBo the Clown", "Clownzo"
- Born: Terrence Jay Knutson; February 6, 1942; Fort Dodge, Iowa, US
- Died: March 9, 2012 (aged 70) Tyler, Texas, US
- Genres: Rock and roll, rockabilly, country music
- Years active: 1957–2012
- Labels: Warwick Records

Terry Teene (February 6, 1942 – March 9, 2012) [sometimes alternatively spelled as Terry Teen] was an American musician, vocalist, songwriter, and entertainer, most commonly known for the early 1960s novelty hit "Curse of the Hearse". According to the Rockabilly Hall of Fame, he recorded over 300 distinct songs and played on 100 or more released recordings, performing as a "major artist" on 25 of them. He has recorded under 70 names and appeared in over 500 nightclubs, by his own count.

== Early life ==
Born Terence Blaine Knutson to Kermit and June Knutson, in Fort Dodge, Iowa, United States, Terry Teene began taking piano lessons at four years of age and later sang in the high school choir. A local DJ, hearing him sing in church, suggested that he audition to perform on a local television program. He performed on TV for eight weeks in a row and put together the band "Terry and the Pirates".

== Songs ==
In 1959, at Norman Petty Recording Studios in Clovis, New Mexico, he cut recordings of his first two songs, "Just Wait Til I Get You Alone" and "Orchids Mean Goodbye" backed by The Fireballs and produced by Norman Petty. These songs were released on a single by Warwick Records.

Of the 300 songs in Teene's discography, "Curse of the Hearse" - a 1961 rock and roll adaptation of "The Hearse Song" - is perhaps his most famous, being played by Dr. Demento on the majority of his Halloween shows. "Pussy Galore" was originally written for the James Bond film Goldfinger, but was not featured on the film or soundtrack. Other songs include "Happiness Is Coming" (under the name Blaine Bel Aire), "We're Going to Put Iowa on the Map", "Fun to Be With", and "Perfect 36".

== Clowning ==
Teene began a second parallel career as a clown. He performed under the names of "ToBo the Clown" and "Clownzo". He later became president of the Cavalcade of Clowns, an association of professional clowns and related entertainers, from 1978 through 1980. He also helped edit the Cavalcade of Clowns magazine. He has appeared with Circus Vargas (for six years), Big John Strong Circus, Mexican International Circus, the Safari Circus (as Producing Clown), and the Emmet Kelly Jr. Circus.

Teene was also a writer and a teacher, who produced three books on clowning and show business. He taught "Clownology" at 'The Business of Show Business, and held regularly scheduled classes in the clown arts at the Learning Tree in Canoga Park, California, as well as recurring seminars at UCLA.

In 1992, Teene was charged with six misdemeanor counts for various violations of health and safety codes due to failure to maintain cleanliness of his Los Angeles home. After refusing to adhere to numerous court orders, Teene was eventually arrested and served eight months in jail.

== Death ==
On March 7, 2012, Teene was severely injured in Tyler, Texas, when the bicycle he was riding struck a tow truck. He died as a result of the accident, on March 9, 2012. He was 70 years old.
