= Pachwad =

Pachwad, Panchwad or Kasabe Panchwad is a village in Wai taluka, Satara district, Maharashtra, India. It is situated on the bank of the Krishna River. The Indian National Highway (NH4) passes through the village. Pachwad is a market place for surrounding villages. Pachwad is famous for weekly market of vegetables.

- Famous for weekly Bazar of livestock animals.
  - Schools: Zilla parishad primary school, Mahatma Gandhi Vidyalaya., Y.C.Senior college.
  - Temples: Navalai Devi,
  - Population: near about 4500
