= Fred Hole =

Art director

- Born: 8 May 1935; Cardiff, Wales
- Died: 4 February 2011 (aged 75); Gerrards Cross, Buckinghamshire
- Occupation: Art director
- Years active: 1966–2002

Fred Hole (8 May 1935 – 4 February 2011) was an English art director. He was nominated for an Academy Award in the category Best Art Direction for the film Return of the Jedi.

== Selected filmography ==
- Return of the Jedi (1983)
