= List of Mexican films of the 2010s =

A list of films produced in the Cinema of Mexico in the 2010s, ordered by the year of release. For an alphabetical list of articles on Mexican films see Category:Mexican films.

== 2010 ==
- List of Mexican films of 2010

== 2011 ==
- List of Mexican films of 2011

== 2012 ==
- List of Mexican films of 2012

== 2013 ==
- List of Mexican films of 2013

== 2014 ==
- List of Mexican films of 2014

== 2015 ==
- List of Mexican films of 2015

== 2016 ==
- List of Mexican films of 2016

== 2017 ==
- List of Mexican films of 2017

== 2018 ==
- List of Mexican films of 2018

== 2019 ==
- List of Mexican films of 2019
