= Alfredo Olmedo =

Argentinian entrepreneur and politician

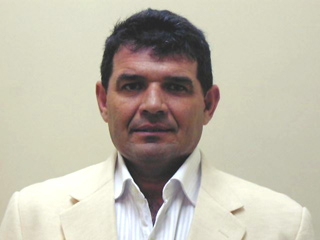
Alfredo Olmedo

Alfredo Horacio Olmedo (born 5 December 1965) is an Argentinian entrepreneur and politician, who served as a National Deputy representing Salta Province, in two terms, 2009 to 2013 and again in 2015 to 2019. He was a candidate for Governor of Salta and also for President of Argentina, but he was never elected. He was born in Rosario de la Frontera into a wealthy family. He is associated with conservative groups in Argentina, defending positions against abortion, same-sex marriage and supporting military interventions.
